= Matins in Lutheranism =

Morning-time liturgical order

In the Lutheran Church, Matins is a morning-time liturgical order combining features that were found in the Medieval orders of Matins, Lauds, and Prime. Lutherans generally retained the Order of Matins for use in schools and in larger city parishes throughout the 16th and 17th centuries. In some places, Matins continued to be sung in Latin still longer. For example, at the close of the eighteenth century in Leipzig, one historian records that "every Sunday and festival day the canonical hours taken over from the Roman Catholic Church are still being chanted before [the chief service] at 6:30 am." The orders experienced a revival in the Confessional Renewal that took place in the 19th century, and now have a stable place in modern Lutheran liturgical books.

== Representative examples ==
A few examples of Matins in the Lutheran Church can be found below. The first column contains the Offices of Matins, Lauds, and Prime as found in the pre-Reformation breviary from the Archdiocese of Magdeburg. The second column provides the Office of Matins from the Lutheran Cathedral of Havelberg, a suffragan of Magdeburg, as found in the 1589 Vesperale of Matthäus Ludecus, dean of the Havelberg Cathedral. The third column provides Matins as it was sung in the Lutheran Cathedral of Magdeburg in 1613, precisely one century after the pre-Reformation breviary in the first column. The final column contains the Order of Matins as found in the 1941 Lutheran Hymnal of the Lutheran Church–Missouri Synod. Along with the outline of the office itself, the various propers for Matins of the First Sunday in Advent are also included.

Magdeburg Breviary (1513)	Vesperale (Havelberg, 1589)	Cantica Sacra (Magdeburg, 1613)	The Lutheran Hymnal (LCMS, 1941)
Matins	Matins	Matins	Matins
Domine labia mea aperies	Domine labia mea aperies	Domine labia mea aperies	"O Lord, open Thou my lips"
Deus in adiutorium meum intende	Deus in adiutorium meum intende	Deus in adiutorium meum intende	"Make haste, O God, to deliver me"
Gloria Patri	Gloria Patri	Gloria Patri	Glory be to the Father...
Alleluia	Alleluia	Alleluia	Alleluia
Invitatory Advent I: Ecce venit rex	Invitatory	Invitatory Advent I: Ecce venit rex	Invitatory Advent I: "Behold, the King cometh..."
Venite	Venite	Venite	Venite
First Nocturne			
			Hymn
Psalmody: Psalm: Beatus vir; Psalm: Quare fremuerunt; Psalm: Domine quod multiplicati; Psalm: Cum invocarem; Psalm: Verba mea auribus; Psalm: Domine ne in furore; Psalm: Domine Deus meus in te speravi; Psalm: Domine Dominus noster; Psalm: Confitebor tibi; Psalm: In Domino confido; Psalm: Salvum me fac Domine; Psalm: Usque quo Domine oblivisceris; Psalm: Dixit insipiens in corde suo; Antiphon for Advent I: Scientes quia hora est	Psalmody: Psalm: Beatus vir; Psalm: Quare fremuerunt; Psalm: Domine quid multiplicati; Psalm: Cum invocarem; Psalm: Verba mea auribus; Psalm: Domine ne in furore; Psalm: Domine Deus meus in te speravi; Psalm: Domine Dominus noster; Psalm: Confitebor tibi; Psalm: In Domino confido; Psalm: Salvum me fac Domine; Psalm: Usquequo Domine oblivisceris; Psalm: Dixit insipiens in corde suo; Antiphon for Advent I: Scientes quia hora est	Psalmody: Psalm: Beatus vir; Psalm: Quare fremuerunt; Psalm: Domine quod multiplicati; Antiphon for Advent I: Scientes quia hora est	Psalmody - "One or more psalms shall be said or chanted" Advent I: Unspecified
Versicle Advent I: V: Egredietur virga de radice Iesse; R: Et flos de radice eius ascendet			
First Lection Advent I: Visio Esaie, filii Amos... (Isaiah 1:1-3)	Lections	Three Lections on Feasts and Sundays, one on Ferias Advent I: Visio Esaie, filii Amos... (Isaiah 1:1-15)	Lections - one or more
Responsory (common, seasonal, or proper to a certain Sunday or feast) Advent I: Aspiciens a longe	Responsory (common, seasonal, or proper to a certain Sunday or feast) Advent I: Ecce dies venerunt	Three Responsories on Sundays and Feasts, one on Ferias (common, seasonal, or proper to a certain Sunday or feast) Advent I: Aspiciens a longe	Responsory (common, seasonal, or proper to a certain Sunday or feast) Advent I: "Behold, the days come, saith the Lord..."
Second Lection Advent I: Ve genti peccatrici (Isaiah 1:4-6)		Second Lection Advent I: Lavamini, mundi estote... (Isaiah 1:16-31)	
Responsory Advent I: Aspiciebam in visu noctis		Responsory Advent I: Aspiciebam in visu noctis	
Third Lection Advent I: Terra vestra deserta (Isaiah 1:7-9)		Third Lection Advent I: Et cum appropinquasset... (Matthew 21:1-9)	
Responsory Advent I: Missus est Gabriel angelus		Responsory Advent I: Missus est Gabriel angelus	
Second Nocturne			
Psalmody: Psalm: Conserva me Domine; Psalm: Exaudi Domine iusticiam; Psalm: Diligam te Domine; Antiphon for Advent I: Nox processit dies autem	Psalmody: Psalm: Conserva me Domine; Psalm: Exaudi Domine iusticiam; Psalm: Diligam te Domine		
Versicle Advent I: V: Egredietur Dominus de loco sancto suo; R: Veniet ut salvum faciat populum suum			
Fourth Lection Advent I: Audite verbum Domini (Isaiah 1:10-13a)			
Responsory Advent I: Ave Maria gratia plena			
Fifth Lection Advent I: Incensum abhominatio est mihi (Isaiah 1:13b-15)			
Responsory Advent I: Salvatorem expectamus			
Sixth Lection Advent I: Levamini mundi estote (Isaiah 1:16-18)			
Responsory Advent I: Audite verbum Domini gentes			
Third Nocturne			
Psalmody: Psalm: Celi enerrant; Psalm: Exaudiat te Dominus; Psalm: Domine in virtute; Antiphon for Advent I: Hora est iam nos de somno surgere	Psalmody: Psalm: Coeli enerrant; Psalm: Exaudiat te Dominus; Psalm: Domine in virtute		
Versicle Advent I: V: Ex Syon species decoris eius; R: Deus noste manifeste veniet			
Seventh Lection Advent I: Cum appropinquasset Iesus (Matthew 21:1-9a)		See Third Lection	
Homily Advent I: Puto res ipsa exigit ut queramus... (Pseudo-Chrysostom, Opus Imperfectum in Matthaeum, Homily 37)			
Responsory Advent I: Ecce virgo concipiet			
Eighth Lection Advent I: Ideo ergo cum tanta (Opus Imperfectum in Matthaeum, Homily 37)			
Responsory Advent I: Obsecro Domine mitte quem missurus			
Ninth Lection Advent I: Quando Iudei voluerunt Christum (Opus Imperfectum in Matthaeum, Homily 37)			
Responsory Advent I: Letentur celi et exultet terra			
			Sermon (optional)
Te Deum: Not said in Advent	Te Deum	Te Deum	Te Deum or Benedictus
	Dominus vobiscum and Oremus Collect Advent I: Excita quesumus Domine; Dominus vobiscum Benedicamus Domino		
Lauds	Lauds	Lauds	
Psalmody: Psalm: Dominus regnavit; Antiphon for Advent I: In illa die stillabunt montes; Psalm: Iubilate Deo; Antiphon for Advent I: Iocundare filia Syon; Psalm: Deus Deus meus ad te de luce vigilo; Psalm: Deus misereatur; Antiphon for Advent I: Ecce Dominus veniet; Benedicite omnia opera; Antiphon for Advent I: Omnes sitientes venite ad aquas; Psalm: Laudate Dominum de celis; Antiphon for Advent I: Ecce veniet propheta magnus	Psalmody: Psalm: Dominus regnavit; Psalm: Iubilate Deo; Psalm: Deus Deus meus ad te de luce vigilo; Psalm: Deus misereatur; Psalm: Laudate Dominum de coelis; Psalm: Cantate Domino canticum novum; Psalm: Laudate Dominum in sanctis eius	Psalmody: Psalm: Dominus regnavit; Antiphon for Advent I: In illa die stillabunt montes; Psalm: Iubilate Deo; Antiphon for Advent I: Iucundare filia Syon; Psalm: Deus Deus meus ad te de luce vigilo; Psalm: Deus misereatur; Antiphon for Advent I: Ecce Dominus veniet; Benedicite omnia opera; Antiphon for Advent I: Omnes sitientes venite ad aquas; Psalm: Laudate Dominum de celis; Antiphon for Advent I: Ecce veniet propheta magnus	
Hymn (seasonal, common, or proper) Advent I: Vox clara ecce intonat		Hymn (seasonal, common, or proper) Advent I: Vox ecce clara personat	Hymn
Chapter Advent I: Scientes quia hora est (Romans 13:11)		Chapter (German version of what was read in Matins) Advent I: Da sie nun nahe... (Matthew 21:1-9)	
Versicle and response (seasonal, common, or proper) Advent I: V: Vox clamantis in deserto parate viam Domino; R: Rectas facite semitas Dei nostri			
Benedictus with antiphon (usually proper, frequently taken from Gospel at Mass): Antiphon for Advent I: Spiritus sanctus in te descendit Maria	Benedictus with antiphon	Benedictus with antiphon (usually proper, frequently taken from Gospel at Mass): Antiphon for Advent I: Spiritus sanctus in te descendet Maria	
Versicle Advent I: V: Ex Syon species decoris eius; R: Deus noste manifeste veniet			
Collect Advent I: Excita quesumus Domine			Collect Advent I: Excita quesumus Domine
Prime	Prime	Prime	
Hymn - Nocte surgentes		Hymn - Jam lucis orto sydere	
Psalmody: Psalm: Deus Deus meus respice in me; Psalm: Dominus regit me; Psalm: Domini est terra; Psalm: Ad te Domine levavi; Psalm: Iudica me Domine; Psalm: Deus in nomine; Psalm: Confitemini Domino; Psalm: Beati immaculati; Psalm: Retribue suo tuo vivifica me; Psalm: Quincunque vult		Psalmody: Psalm: Dominus regit me or; Psalm: Confitemini Domino or; Psalm: Quincunque vult	
Chapter: Domine miserere nostri... (Isaiah 33:2)			
Responsory: Christe fili Dei vivi		Responsory: Christe fili Dei vivi	
Ninefold Kyrie			Threefold Kyrie
Pater noster			"Our Father..."
Preces			Optional suffrages
Confiteor			
Preces			
Dominus vobiscum and Oremus	Dominus vobiscum and Oremus		"The Lord be with you"
Collect - Domine sancte Pater omnipotens...			Collects Collect for Grace: "O Lord, our heavenly Father..."
Versicles			
Collect - Actiones nostras...			
Oremus			
Collect - Sancta Maria mater Domini...			
Deus in adiutorium meum intende (x3)			
Gloria Patri			
Threefold Kyrie			
Pater noster			
Versicles (Psalm 90:16-17)			
Oremus			
Dirigere et sanctificare...			
Dominus vobiscum	Dominus vobiscum		
Benedicamus Domino	Benedicamus Domino	Benedicamus Domino	"Bless we the Lord."
			Benediction
