= Psalm 3 =

3rd psalm of the book of psalms

- "Lord, how are they increased that trouble me!"
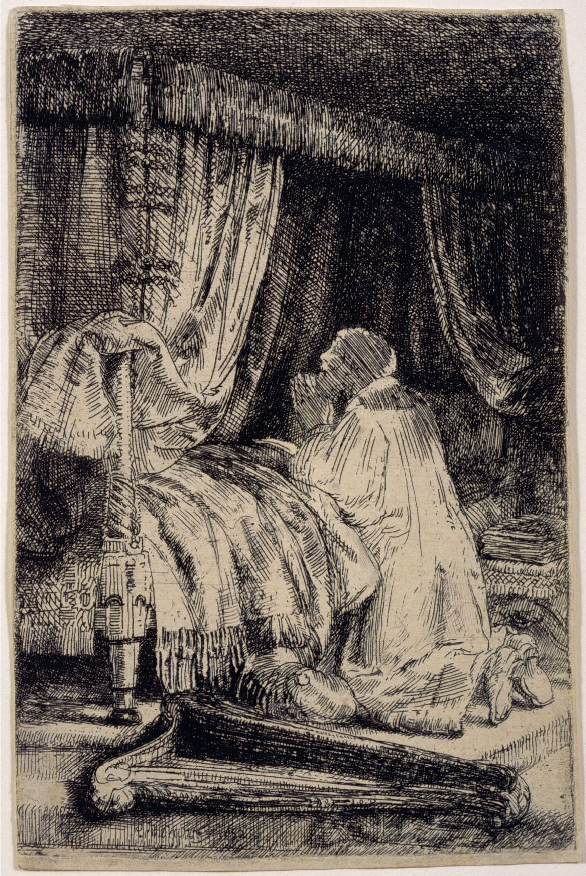
- David in Prayer by Rembrandt van Rijn (1652)
- Other name: "Domine quid multiplicati sunt"
- Text: by David
- Language: Hebrew (original)

Psalm 3
- ← Psalm 2 Psalm 4 →
- Book: Book of Psalms
- Hebrew Bible part: Ketuvim
- Order in the Hebrew part: 1
- Category: Sifrei Emet
- Christian Bible part: Old Testament
- Order in the Christian part: 19

Psalm 3 is the third psalm of the Book of Psalms, beginning in English in the King James Version: "Lord, how are they increased that trouble me!" The Book of Psalms is part of the Ketuvim (Writings)—the third section of the Hebrew Bible—and a book of the Christian Old Testament. In Latin, it is known as "Domine quid multiplicati sunt". The psalm is a personal thanksgiving to God, who answered the prayer of an afflicted soul. It is attributed to David and relates in particular to the time when he fled from his son Absalom.

The psalm forms a regular part of Jewish, Catholic, Lutheran, Anglican and other Protestant liturgies. It has often been set to music, including works in Latin by Marc-Antoine Charpentier, Michel-Richard Delalande and Henry Purcell.

== Context ==
Psalm 3 is the first psalm with a title in the original, and it concerns a specific time of crisis in David's life. David fled Absalom because of a series of events that followed after David was put under discipline for his own sins regarding Bathsheba and Uriah the Hittite. In that light, the prayer is a model for looking to God for help even in the midst of God's chastisement. Even so, David prays, "Thy blessing is upon Thy people".

An evening and a morning are seen (verse 5) as David lies down to sleep and wakes up protected and sustained by providence. Absalom's advisor Ahitophel is personified as the mouth who David asks God to "break the teeth of", and in the account, Ahitophel's counsel is frustrated and Ahitophel faces his demise. David fleeing his son at the start of Psalm 3 is in direct contrast with taking refuge in "the Son" at the end of Psalm 2.

This is also the first psalm which has the word or instruction selah, which appears after verses 2, 4 and 8. The final selah possibly indicates that Psalm 3 and Psalm 4 are tied together somehow.

David spent more years fleeing Saul as a young man than he spent fleeing his son Absalom. David wrote many psalms later in the book of Psalms that address situations in which Saul was pursuing him. But here is one of the opening songs in the Book of Psalms, and it is about the painful experience of fleeing from his own son.

== Text ==
The following table shows the Hebrew text of the Psalm with vowels and cantillation marks, alongside the English translation from the King James Version, the Latin text in the Vulgate and the Koine Greek text in the Septuagint. Note that the meaning can slightly differ between these versions, as the Septuagint and the Masoretic Text come from different textual traditions. (Note: A 1917 translation directly from Hebrew to English by the Jewish Publication Society can be found here or here, and an 1844 translation directly from the Septuagint by L. C. L. Brenton can be found here. Both translations are in the public domain.)

#	Hebrew	English	Latin	Greek
(Note: In the Jewish verse numbering, the ascription of this psalm is verse 1, and the rest of the psalm begins from verse 2. However, the Christian verse numbering does not count the ascription as a separate verse.)	מִזְמ֥וֹר לְדָוִ֑ד בְּ֝בׇרְח֗וֹ מִפְּנֵ֤י ׀ אַבְשָׁל֬וֹם בְּנֽוֹ׃	(A Psalm of David, when he fled from Absalom his son.)	Psalmus David, cum fugeret a facie Absalom filii sui.	Ψαλμὸς τῷ Δαυιδ, ὁπότε ἀπεδίδρασκεν ἀπὸ προσώπου Αβεσσαλωμ τοῦ υἱοῦ αὐτοῦ.
1	יְ֭הֹוָה מָה־רַבּ֣וּ צָרָ֑י רַ֝בִּ֗ים קָמִ֥ים עָלָֽי׃	Lord, how are they increased that trouble me! many are they that rise up against me.	Domine quid multiplicati sunt qui tribulant me? multi insurgunt adversum me.	Κύριε, τί ἐπληθύνθησαν οἱ θλίβοντές με; πολλοὶ ἐπανίστανται ἐπ' ἐμέ·
2	רַבִּים֮ אֹמְרִ֢ים לְנַ֫פְשִׁ֥י אֵ֤ין יְֽשׁוּעָ֓תָה לּ֬וֹ בֵאלֹהִ֬ים סֶֽלָה׃	Many there be which say of my soul, There is no help for him in God. Selah.	Multi dicunt animæ meæ: Non est salus ipsi in Deo ejus.	πολλοὶ λέγουσιν τῇ ψυχῇ μου Οὐκ ἔστιν σωτηρία αὐτῷ ἐν τῷ Θεῷ αὐτοῦ. διάψαλμα.
3	וְאַתָּ֣ה יְ֭הֹוָה מָגֵ֣ן בַּעֲדִ֑י כְּ֝בוֹדִ֗י וּמֵרִ֥ים רֹאשִֽׁי׃	But thou, O LORD, art a shield for me; my glory, and the lifter up of mine head.	Tu autem Domine susceptor meus es, gloria mea, et exaltans caput meum.	σὺ δέ, Κύριε, ἀντιλήμπτωρ μου εἶ, δόξα μου καὶ ὑψῶν τὴν κεφαλήν μου.
4	ק֭וֹלִי אֶל־יְהֹוָ֣ה אֶקְרָ֑א וַיַּעֲנֵ֨נִי מֵהַ֖ר קׇדְשׁ֣וֹ סֶֽלָה׃	I cried unto the LORD with my voice, and he heard me out of his holy hill. Selah.	Voce mea ad Dominum clamavi: et exaudivit me de monte sancto suo.	φωνῇ μου πρὸς κύριον ἐκέκραξα, καὶ ἐπήκουσέν μου ἐξ ὄρους ἁγίου αὐτοῦ. διάψαλμα.
5	אֲנִ֥י שָׁכַ֗בְתִּי וָאִ֫ישָׁ֥נָה הֱקִיצ֑וֹתִי כִּ֖י יְהֹוָ֣ה יִסְמְכֵֽנִי׃	I laid me down and slept; I awaked; for the LORD sustained me.	Ego dormivi, et soporatus sum: et exurrexi, quia Dominus suscepit me.	ἐγὼ ἐκοιμήθην καὶ ὕπνωσα· ἐξηγέρθην, ὅτι Κύριος ἀντιλήμψεταί μου.
6	לֹֽא־אִ֭ירָא מֵרִבְב֥וֹת עָ֑ם אֲשֶׁ֥ר סָ֝בִ֗יב שָׁ֣תוּ עָלָֽי׃	I will not be afraid of ten thousands of people, that have set themselves against me round about.	Non timebo millia populi circumdantis me:	οὐ φοβηθήσομαι ἀπὸ μυριάδων λαοῦ τῶν κύκλῳ συνεπιτιθεμένων μοι.
7	ק֘וּמָ֤ה יְהֹוָ֨ה ׀ הוֹשִׁ֘יעֵ֤נִי אֱלֹהַ֗י כִּֽי־הִכִּ֣יתָ אֶת־כׇּל־אֹיְבַ֣י לֶ֑חִי שִׁנֵּ֖י רְשָׁעִ֣ים שִׁבַּֽרְתָּ׃	Arise, O LORD; save me, O my God: for thou hast smitten all mine enemies upon the cheek bone; thou hast broken the teeth of the ungodly.	exurge Domine: salvum me fac Deus meus. Quoniam tu percussisti omnes adversantes mihi sine causa: dentes peccatorum contrivisti.	ἀνάστα, Κύριε, σῶσόν με, ὁ Θεός μου, ὅτι σὺ ἐπάταξας πάντας τοὺς ἐχθραίνοντάς μοι ματαίως, ὀδόντας ἁμαρτωλῶν συνέτριψας.
8	לַֽיהֹוָ֥ה הַיְשׁוּעָ֑ה עַֽל־עַמְּךָ֖ בִרְכָתֶ֣ךָ סֶּֽלָה׃	Salvation belongeth unto the LORD: thy blessing is upon thy people. Selah.	Domini est salus: et super populum tuum benedictio tua.	τοῦ Κυρίου ἡ σωτηρία, καὶ ἐπὶ τὸν λαόν σου ἡ εὐλογία σου.

== Commentary ==
=== Matthew Henry ===
According to Matthew Henry's Concise Commentary (1706), verses 1–3 depict David complaining to God about his enemies and confiding in God. Verses 4–8 represent his triumphs over his fears, and "give God the glory", while "taking to himself the comfort".

=== Martin Luther ===
Martin Luther felt that, overall, the goal in this psalm is to impart the confidence of those who consider themselves followers of YHWH to call on him. "But you, Yahweh, are a shield around me, my glory, and uplifts my head." (verse 3 in the Christian Bible; verse 4 in the Hebrew Bible): This is the emphatic prayer of the oppressed who turn aside to YHWH.

Although written in the mouth of David, the reader is encouraged to consider how God rescues someone like David, who was at that time very in distress, saved, and later raised to be king over all Israel.

== Uses ==
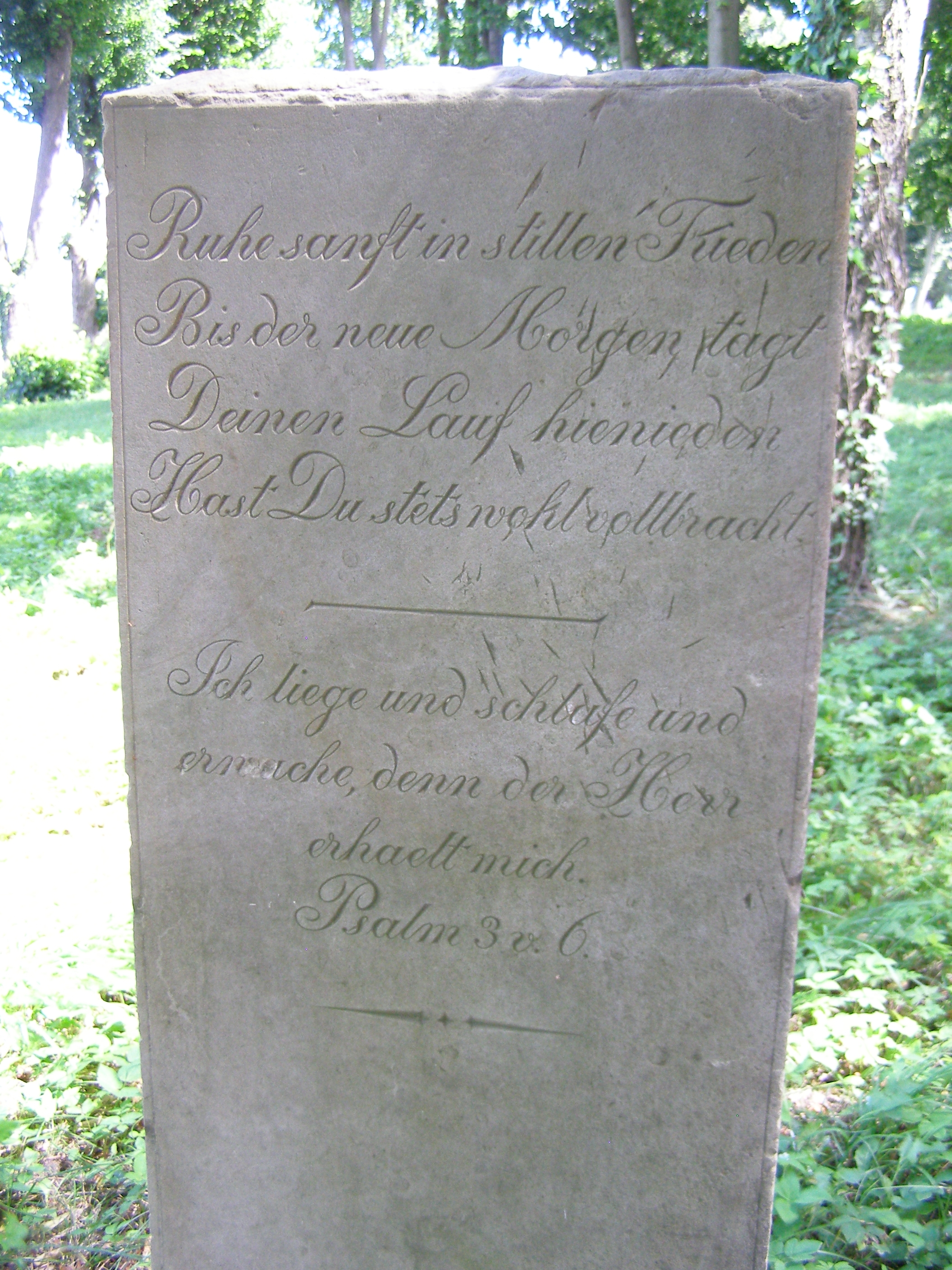
Psalm 3:6 in Jegłownik cemetery, Poland

=== Judaism ===
- In the Hebrew Bible, the prayer of Jonah in the "fish" starts with Psalm 3 and he also ends his prayer drawing on Psalm 3. Jonah also draws on other psalms—namely Psalms 16, 18, 31, 42, 50, 88, 116, 118, 119 and 120.
- Verses 2–9 are part of the prayers of the Bedtime Shema.
- Verse 9 is the eighth verse of V'hu Rachum in Pesukei Dezimra, as well as in the late Ashkenazic custom in most communities it is also found in Havdalah.

=== Eastern Orthodox Church ===
Psalm 3 is the first of the "Six Psalms" which are read as part of every Orthros (Matins) service. During the reading of the "Six Psalms", movement and noise are strongly discouraged, as it is regarded as one of the most holy moments of the Orthros service.

=== Coptic Orthodox Church ===
In the Agpeya, the Coptic Church's book of hours, this psalm is prayed in the office of Prime, as well as the first watch of the Midnight office.

=== Catholic Church ===
About 530 in the Rule of St. Benedict, Benedict of Nursia chose Psalm 3 for the beginning of the office of matins, namely as the first psalm in the liturgy of the Benedictine during the year. In the abbeys that preserve the tradition, it is currently the first Psalm Sunday for the office of vigils. In the current Liturgy of the Hours, Psalm 3 is sung or recited the first Office of Readings on Sunday of the week, after the first two psalms.

=== Book of Common Prayer ===
In the Church of England's Book of Common Prayer, Psalm 3 is appointed to be read on the morning of the first day of the month.

== Musical settings ==
Psalm 3 has been set to music by many composers. Heinrich Schütz wrote a setting of a paraphrase in German, "Ach wie groß ist der Feinde Rott", SWV 099, for the Becker Psalter, published first in 1628. Marc-Antoine Charpentier composed around 1676 one "Domine quid multiplicati sunt", for 3 voices, 2 treble instruments and continuo, H.172. Michel-Richard Delalande composed his grand motet Domine quid sunt Multiplicati (S.37) for the offices of the Chapel of Versailles, and Henry Purcell set a variant version of the Latin text, "Jehova, quam multi sunt hostes mei," for five voices and continuo. There are also Byron Cage's "Thou Art A Shield For Me", and "Christian Karaoke Praise Song Psalm 3 worship" by Andrew Bain.

== Illuminated Manuscripts ==
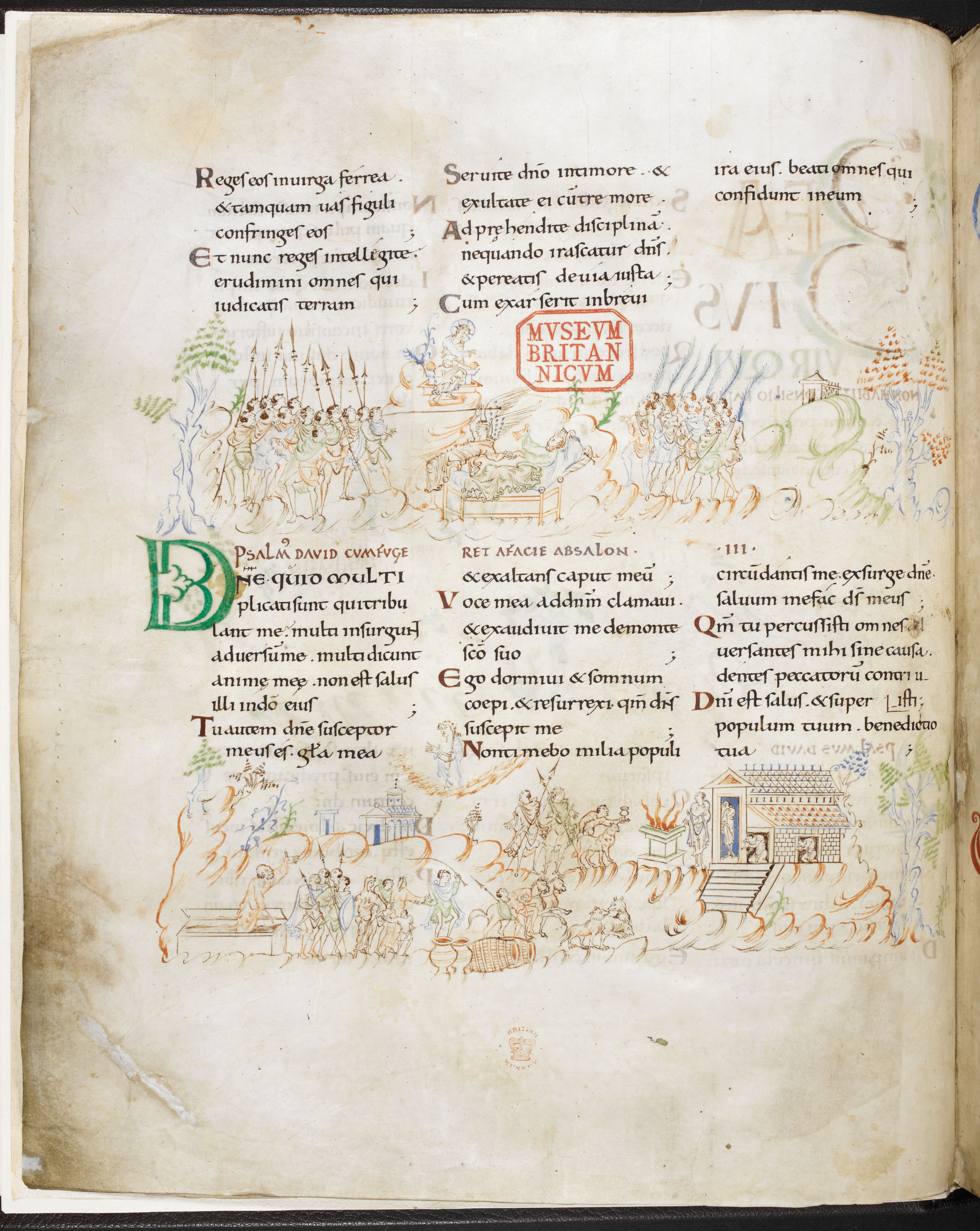
Psalm 3 in the Harley Psalter.

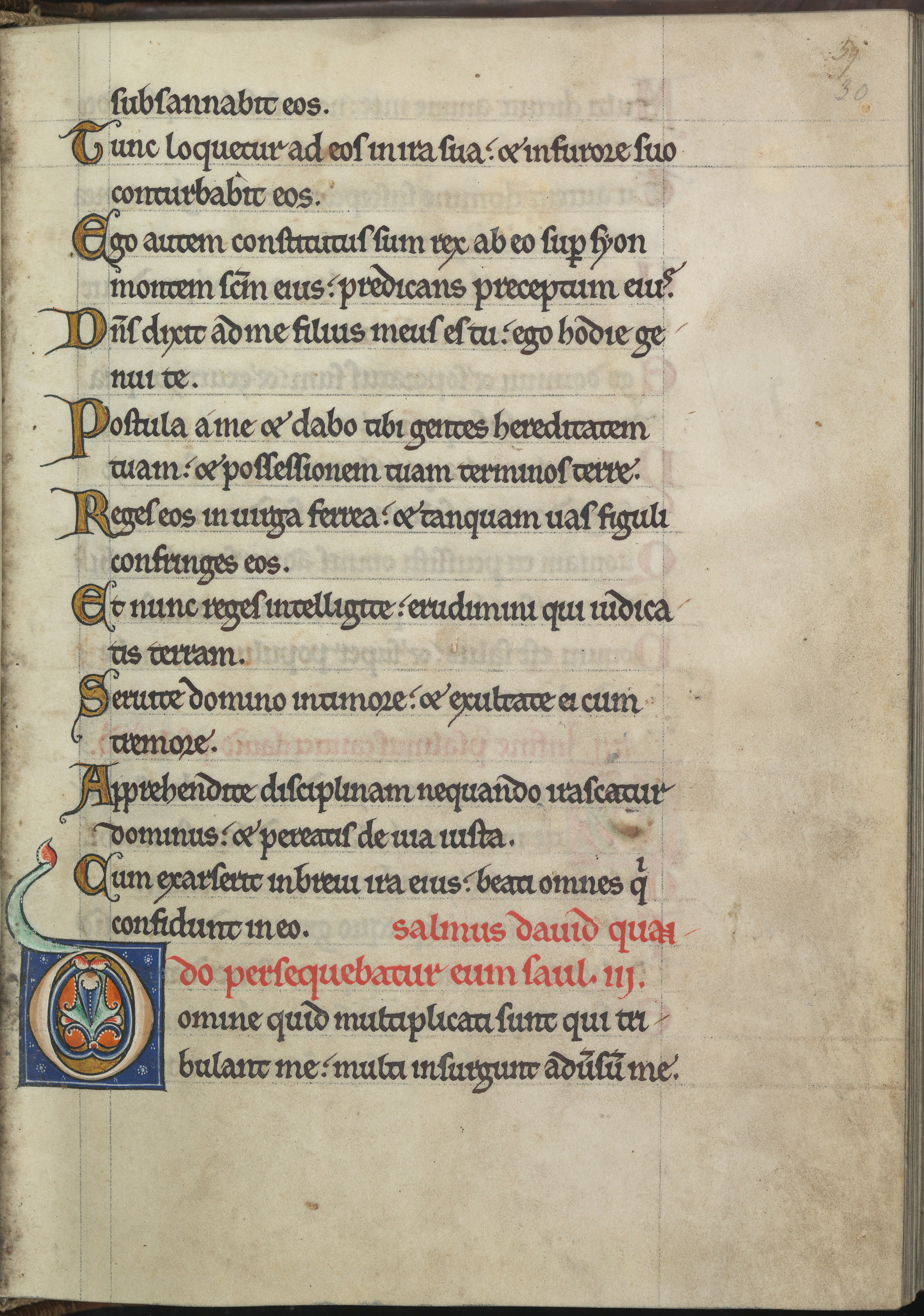
The beginning of Psalm 3 in the Psalter of Eleanor of Aquitaine.
