= Ralph Buckland (priest) =

English Roman Catholic priest

The Reverend Ralph Buckland

Orders
- Ordination: 1586–8

Personal details
- Born: 1564
- Died: 1611 (aged 46–47)
- Denomination: Roman Catholic
- Education: Magdalen College, Oxford

Ralph Buckland (1564–1611) was an English Roman Catholic divine. He was educated at Merchant Taylors' School in 1571, and Magdalen College, Oxford in 1579; was a law-student in London; studied at Reims and Rome in 1586; was ordained priest in 1588, and sent on the English mission; and finally banished from England in 1606. He was the author of theological works.

== Life ==
Ralph Buckland, born in 1564, was the son of Edmund Buckland, who was descended from an ancient family living at West Harptree, Somersetshire. He was admitted into Merchant Taylors' School on 15 June 1571, and in Michaelmas term 1579 he became a commoner of Magdalen College, Oxford, but before he took a degree he came to London and studied the municipal laws for some time. At length, being "inflamed with a love to the Roman catholic religion, he left his parents, country, and the prospects of a fair inheritance", and went to the English College at Rheims. He proceeded to the Roman seminary in February 1585–6, returned to Rheims in September 1588, and, having been ordained, was in December the same year sent to England to labour on the mission.

Wood supposes that Buckland lived chiefly in his own county, and "spent above twenty years in doing offices belonging to his profession". His name appears on a list of forty-seven priests and Jesuits banished in 1606. He died in 1611, leaving behind him "among the brethren" the character of a "most pious and seraphical person,—a person who went beyond all of his time for fervent devotion". (Note: Wood, Athenæ Oxonienses. ed. Bliss, ii. 107) Dodd mentions that Buckland presented a piece of St. Thomas of Canterbury's hair shirt to Douay College, where it was preserved with due respect in a silver case. (Note: Dodd, Church History. ii. 385)

== Works ==
1. Seaven sparkes of the enkindled soule, with foure lamentations composed in the hard times of Q. Elizabeth, 8vo, without place or date, but printed after the accession of James I. James Ussher, Primate of Ireland, in a sermon preached at St. Mary's, Oxford, on 5 November 1640, referred to this book, which contains pious aspirations for the reconciliation of Great Britain to the Roman Church, and cited passages to show that the existence of the Gunpowder Plot was known and its success prayed for in Rome two years before its discovery. The alleged proof, however, consisted merely of fervent ejaculations and scriptural quotations such as: Psalm 2, p. 32, "But the memory of novelties shall perish with a crack: as a ruinous house falling to the ground". Psalm 4, p. 54, "The crack was heard into all lands; and made nations quake for fear". Wood points out that there is no reason for Ussher's supposition that the book was printed at Rome.
2. An embassage from heaven; wherein Christ giueth to understand his iust indignation against al such as being catholikely minded, dare yeelde their presence to the rites and praier of the malignant church, 8vo, without place or date. A metrical epilogue is prefixed to the work.
3. An English translation of De Persecutione Vandelica, written by Victor of Tunnuna, Bishop of Biserte or Utica, who flourished about 490 AD.
4. A translation of the six tomes of Laurentius Surius De Vitis Sanctorum. This is often quoted under the name of Robert (instead of Ralph) Buckland.

== Sources ==
- This article incorporates text from a publication now in the public domain: Cooper, Thompson (1886). "Buckland, Ralph". In Stephen, Leslie (ed.). Dictionary of National Biography. Vol. 7. London: Smith, Elder & Co. pp. 205–206.
