= Ralph Buckland =

Ralph Buckland may refer to:

- Ralph Pomeroy Buckland (1812–1892), U.S. Representative from Ohio and Union Army brigadier general
- Ralph Buckland (priest) (1564–1611), English Roman Catholic divine
