= Psalm 4 =

Fourth psalm of the Book of Psalms

- "Hear me when I call, O God of my righteousness"
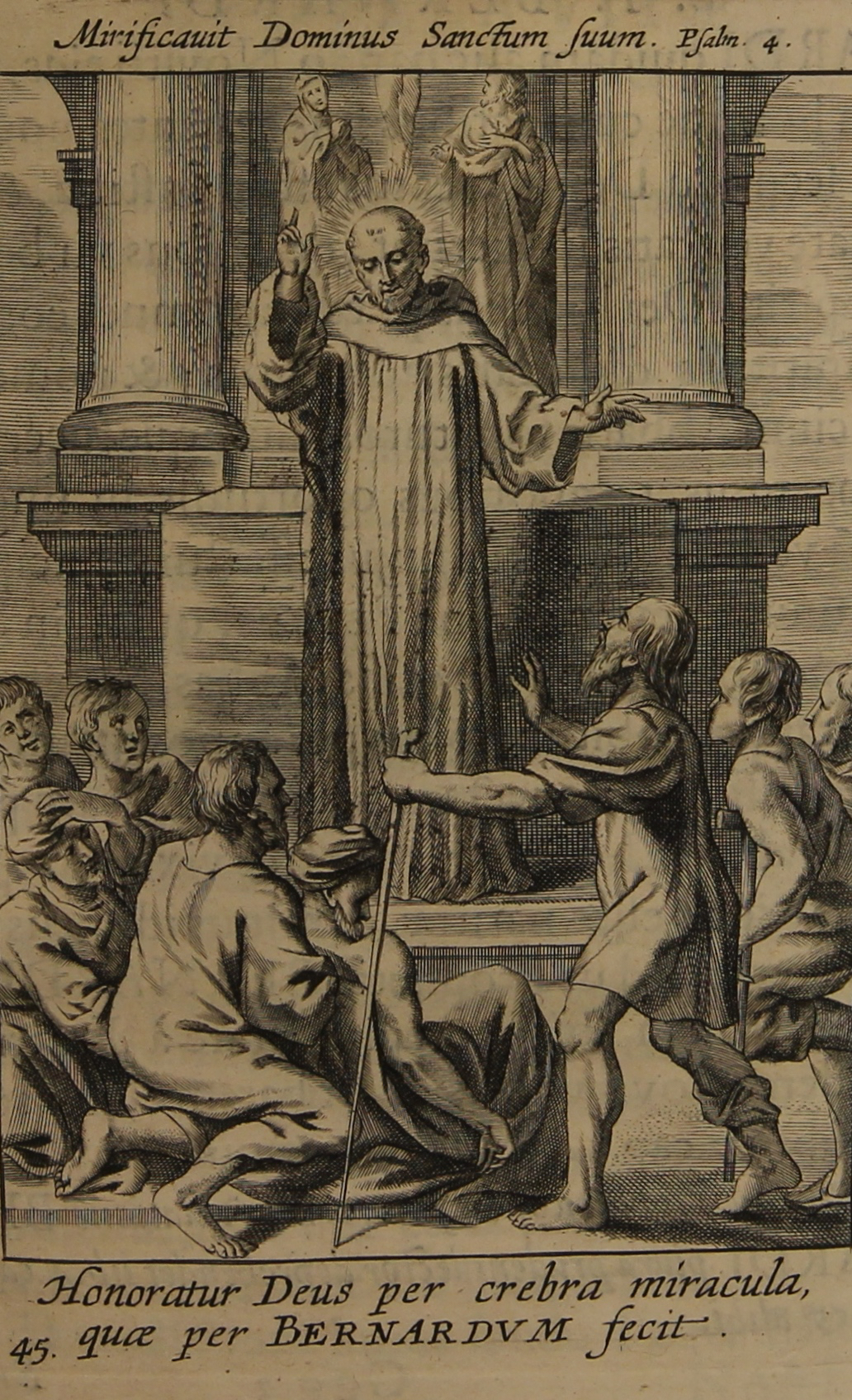
- Mirificauit Dominus Sanctum suum. Psalm. 4. Copperplate print by Jacobus Neeffs, 1653.
- Other name: "Cum invocarem"
- Text: attributed to David
- Language: Hebrew (original)

Psalm 4
- ← Psalm 3 Psalm 5 →
- Book: Book of Psalms
- Hebrew Bible part: Ketuvim
- Order in the Hebrew part: 1
- Category: Sifrei Emet
- Christian Bible part: Old Testament
- Order in the Christian part: 19

Psalm 4 is the fourth psalm of the Book of Psalms, beginning in the English of the King James Version: "Hear me when I call, O God of my righteousness". The Book of Psalms is part of the Ketuvim (Writings)—the third section of the Hebrew Bible—and a book of the Christian Old Testament. In Latin, it is known as "Cum invocarem". The psalm is traditionally attributed to David, but his authorship is not accepted by modern scholars. The message in the psalm is that the victories of sinners are only temporary, and that only repentance can bring joy.

The psalm forms a regular part of Jewish, Catholic, Lutheran, Anglican and other Protestant liturgies. It has often been set to music, including works in Latin by Michel Richard Delalande, Henry Desmarest and Marc-Antoine Charpentier.

== Context ==
Psalm 4 is traditionally attributed to David, but his authorship is not accepted by modern scholars. The psalm's Latin title is Cum invocarem.

The psalm's text is a reflection of David speaking to all sinners while addressing himself to Absalom. The message in the psalm is that the victories of sinners are only temporary and meaningless, and that only repentance can bring true happiness. It is a request to God for deliverance from past distresses.

This is the first psalm of the book of Psalms with a musical instrument—strings—mentioned in the title. There also was a selah ending the previous psalm, Psalm 3. There is, however, no agreement what selah meant. Popular modern views might include a pause, a reflection or a lifting. Poetically, if selah is a connection, it is as if David recited his Psalm 3, then paused and began to sing, continuing with his harp. The themes will be false and true worship, but also false and true satisfaction. "They long for prosperity", David sings, but David has it and is more satisfied "than when their grain and new wine abound". Some see a chiastic structure in the layout of this psalm.

== Text ==
The following table shows the Hebrew text of the Psalm with vowels and cantillation marks, alongside the English translation from the King James Version, the Latin text in the Vulgate and the Koine Greek text in the Septuagint. Note that the meaning can slightly differ between these versions, as the Septuagint and the Masoretic Text come from different textual traditions. (Note: A 1917 translation directly from Hebrew to English by the Jewish Publication Society can be found here or here (without cantillation marks), and an 1844 translation directly from the Septuagint by L. C. L. Brenton can be found here. Both translations are in the public domain.)

#	Hebrew	English	Latin	Greek
(Note: In the Jewish verse numbering, the ascription of this psalm is verse 1, and the rest of the psalm begins from verse 2. However, the Christian verse numbering does not count the ascription as a separate verse.)	לַמְנַצֵּ֥חַ בִּנְגִינ֗וֹת מִזְמ֥וֹר לְדָוִֽד׃	(To the chief Musician on Neginoth, A Psalm of David.)	In finem in carminibus, Psalmus David.	Εἰς τὸ τέλος, ἐν ψαλμοῖς· ᾠδὴ τῷ Δαυιδ.
1	בְּקׇרְאִ֡י עֲנֵ֤נִי ׀ אֱלֹ֘הֵ֤י צִדְקִ֗י בַּ֭צָּר הִרְחַ֣בְתָּ לִּ֑י חׇ֝נֵּ֗נִי וּשְׁמַ֥ע תְּפִלָּתִֽי׃	Hear me when I call, O God of my righteousness: thou hast enlarged me when I was in distress; have mercy upon me, and hear my prayer.	Cum invocarem exaudivit me Deus justitiæ meæ: in tribulatione dilatasti mihi. Miserere mei, et exaudi orationem meam.	ἐν τῷ ἐπικαλεῖσθαί με εἰσήκουσέν μου· ὁ θεὸς τῆς δικαιοσυνης μου. Ἐν θλίψει ἐπλάτυνάς μοι· οἰκτίρησόν με καὶ εἰσάκουσον τῆς προσευχῆς μου
2	בְּנֵ֥י אִ֡ישׁ עַד־מֶ֬ה כְבוֹדִ֣י לִ֭כְלִמָּה תֶּאֱהָב֣וּן רִ֑יק תְּבַקְשׁ֖וּ כָזָ֣ב סֶֽלָה׃	O ye sons of men, how long will ye turn my glory into shame? how long will ye love vanity, and seek after leasing? Selah.	Filii hominum usquequo gravi corde? ut quid diligitis vanitatem, et quæritis mendacium?	υἱοὶ ἀνθρώπων, ἕως πότε βαρυκάρδιοι; ἵνα τί ἀγαπᾶτε ματαιότητα καὶ ζητεῖτε ψεῦδος; διάψαλμα.
3	וּדְע֗וּ כִּֽי־הִפְלָ֣ה יְ֭הֹוָה חָסִ֣יד ל֑וֹ יְהֹוָ֥ה יִ֝שְׁמַ֗ע בְּקׇרְאִ֥י אֵלָֽיו׃	But know that the LORD hath set apart him that is godly for himself: the LORD will hear when I call unto him.	Et scitote quoniam mirificavit Dominus sanctum suum: Dominus exaudiet me cum clamavero ad eum.	καὶ γνῶτε ὅτι ἐθαυμάστωσεν Κύριος τὸν ὅσιον αὐτοῦ· Κύριος εἰσακούσεταί μου ἐν τῷ κεκραγέναι με πρὸς αὐτόν..
4	רִגְז֗וּ וְֽאַל־תֶּ֫חֱטָ֥אוּ אִמְר֣וּ בִ֭לְבַבְכֶם עַֽל־מִשְׁכַּבְכֶ֗ם וְדֹ֣מּוּ סֶֽלָה׃	Stand in awe, and sin not: commune with your own heart upon your bed, and be still. Selah.	Irascimini, et nolite peccare: quæ dicitis in cordibus vestris, in cubilibus vestris compungimini.	ὀργίζεσθε καὶ μὴ ἁμαρτάνετε· λέγετε ἐν ταῖς καρδίαις ὑμῶν καὶ ἐπὶ ταῖς κοίταις ὑμῶν κατανύγητε. διάψαλμα.
5	זִבְח֥וּ זִבְחֵי־צֶ֑דֶק וּ֝בִטְח֗וּ אֶל־יְהֹוָֽה׃	Offer the sacrifices of righteousness, and put your trust in the LORD.	Sacrificate sacrificium justitiæ, et sperate in Domino.	θύσατε θυσίαν δικαιοσύνης καὶ ἐλπίσατε ἐπὶ Κύριον.
6	רַבִּ֥ים אֹמְרִים֮ מִֽי־יַרְאֵ֢נ֫וּ ט֥וֹב נְֽסָה־עָ֭לֵינוּ א֨וֹר פָּנֶ֬יךָ יְהֹוָֽה׃	There be many that say, Who will shew us any good? LORD, lift thou up the light of thy countenance upon us.	multi dicunt: Quis ostendit nobis bona? Signatum est super nos lumen vultus tui Domine:	πολλοὶ λέγουσιν Τίς δείξει ἡμῖν τὰ ἀγαθά; ἐσημειώθη ἐφ' ἡμᾶς τὸ φῶς τοῦ προσώπου σου, Κύριε.
7	נָתַ֣תָּה שִׂמְחָ֣ה בְלִבִּ֑י מֵעֵ֬ת דְּגָנָ֖ם וְתִירוֹשָׁ֣ם רָֽבּוּ׃	Thou hast put gladness in my heart, more than in the time that their corn and their wine increased.	dedisti lætitiam in corde meo. A fructu frumenti, vini, et olei sui multiplicati sunt.	ἔδωκας εὐφροσύνην εἰς τὴν καρδίαν μου· ἀπὸ καιροῦ σίτου καὶ οἴνου καὶ ἐλαίου αὐτῶν ἐπληθύνθησαν.
8	בְּשָׁל֣וֹם יַחְדָּו֮ אֶשְׁכְּבָ֢ה וְאִ֫ישָׁ֥ן כִּֽי־אַתָּ֣ה יְהֹוָ֣ה לְבָדָ֑ד לָ֝בֶ֗טַח תּֽוֹשִׁיבֵֽנִי׃	I will both lay me down in peace, and sleep: for thou, LORD, only makest me dwell in safety.	In pace in idipsum dormiam, et requiescam; quoniam tu Domine singulariter in spe constituisti me.	ἐν εἰρήνῃ ἐπὶ τὸ αὐτὸ κοιμηθήσομαι καὶ ὑπνώσω, ὅτι σύ, Κύριε, κατὰ μόνας ἐπ' ἐλπίδι κατῴκισάς με

== Uses ==
=== Judaism ===
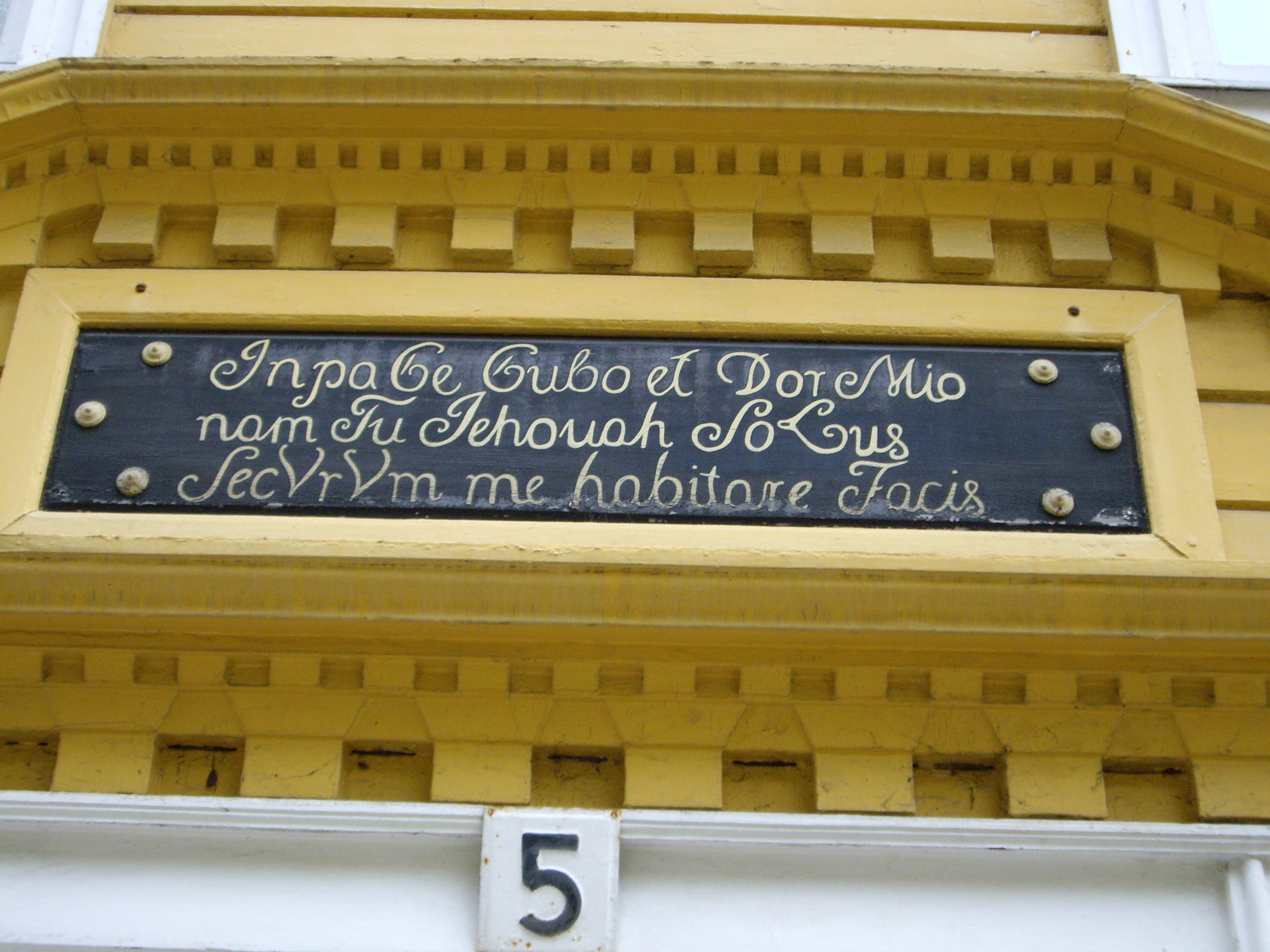
Inscriptions referencing Psalm 4

- Verse 5 is part of the prayers of the Bedtime Shema.
- Verse 7 is part of the Prayer for Sustenance recited on High Holidays.

=== New Testament ===
Verse 4 is quoted in Ephesians 4:26.

=== Book of Common Prayer ===
In the Church of England's Book of Common Prayer, Psalm 4 is appointed to be read on the morning of the first day of the month.

=== Catholic Church ===
The psalm forms part of the Benedictine rite of the daily evening prayer Compline. After the Reform of the Roman Breviary by Pope Pius X it was only used on Sundays and Solemnities. In the Liturgy of the Hours it is part of Compline on the eve of Sunday and Solemnities.

=== Coptic Orthodox Church ===
In the Agpeya, the Coptic Church's book of hours, this psalm is prayed in the office of Prime. It is also in the prayer of the Veil, which is generally prayed only by monks.

== Musical settings ==
While several composers set the whole Psalm 4, some writers and composers focused on the aspect of sleeping in peace, as a base for evening music.

Fanny Crosby wrote a hymn based on verse 8 in 1853, titled “An Evening Hymn", which she described as her first published hymn.

Heinrich Schütz composed a setting of a metred version in German, "Erhör mich, wenn ich ruf zu dir", SWV 100, published in 1628 in the Becker Psalter. Michel Richard Delalande wrote a great motet (S41) in Latin in 1692 for services celebrated in the royal chapel of Versailles. Henry Desmarest also wrote a great motet on the psalm. Marc-Antoine Charpentier composed around 1689 Cum invocarem exaudivit me, H. 198, for soloists, choir, flutes, strings and continuo. Desmarest, Nicolas Bernier, André Campra, wrote a great motet Cum invocarem exaudivit me. A plainsong version was included in H. B. Briggs and W. H. Frere's Manual of Plainsong published in 1902.

Max Drischner composed a setting of verses 7 and 9, combined with Psalm 74:16, as the final movement of his Tübinger Psalmen for voice, violin and organ, or choir, melody instrument and keyboard instrument, in 1948, titled "Ich liege und schlafe ganz mit Frieden".

== Illuminated Manuscripts ==
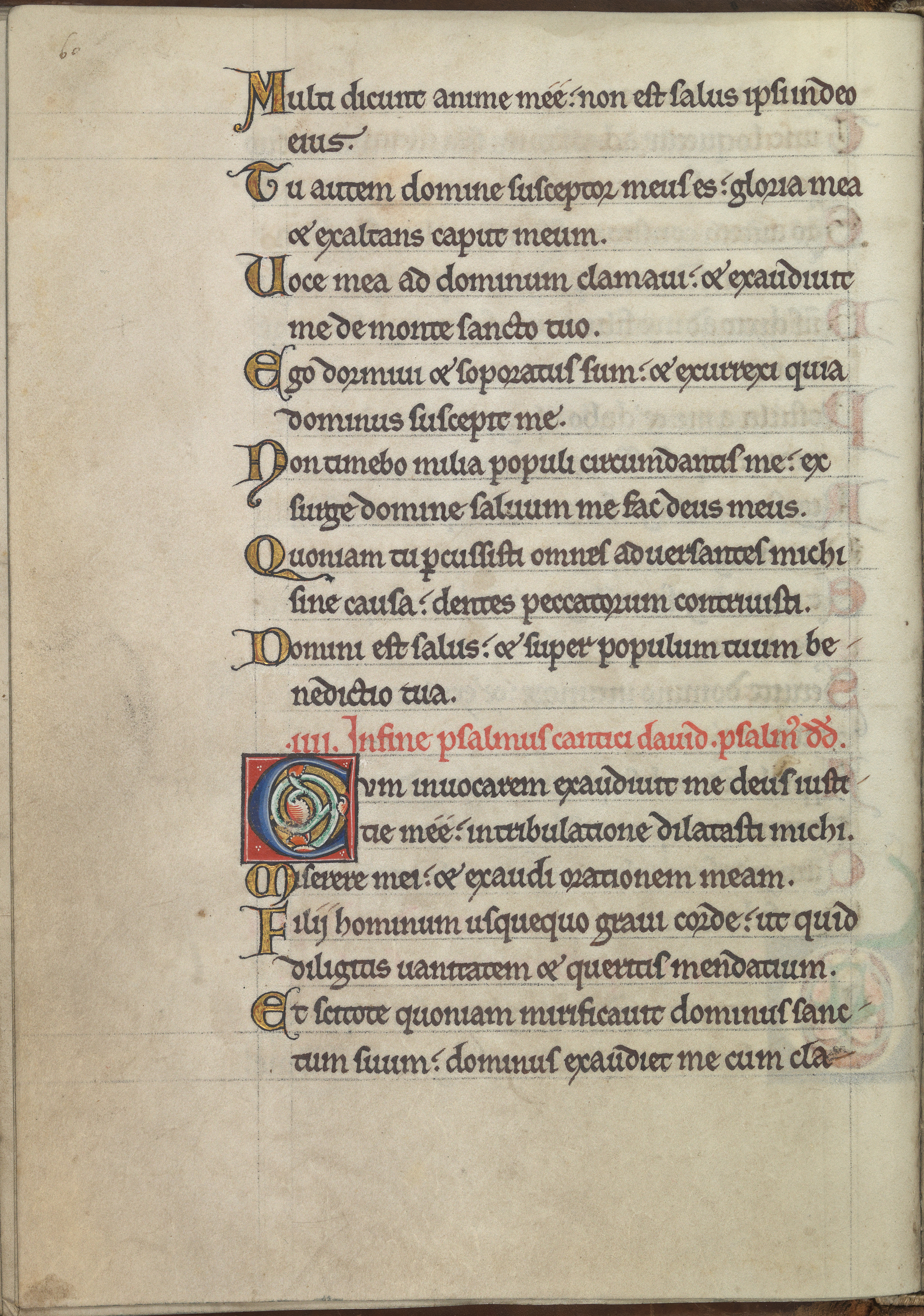
The beginning of Psalm 4 in the Psalter of Eleanor of Aquitaine.

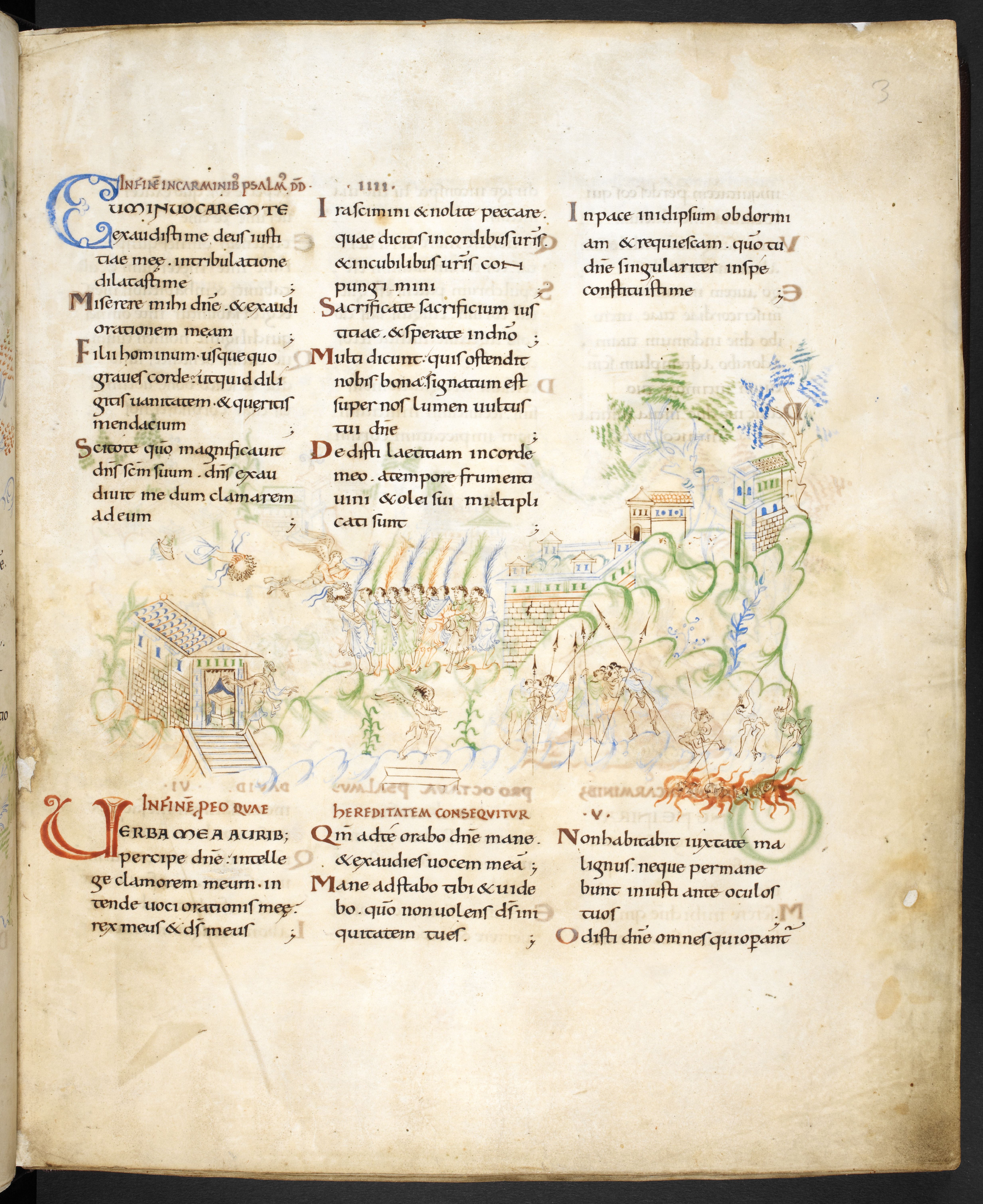
Psalm 4, and the beginning of Psalm 5, in the Harley Psalter.
