= Psalm 2 =

Second psalm of the Book of Psalms

- "Why do the heathen rage"
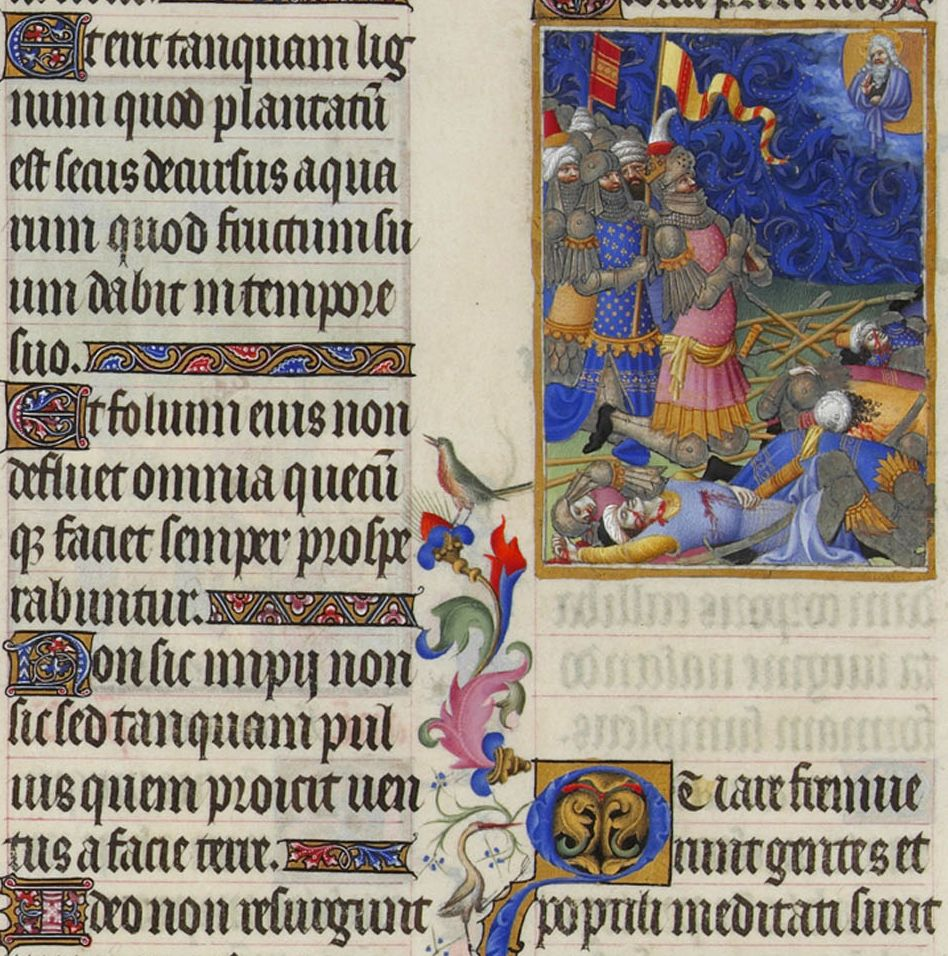
- Beginning of Psalm 2 in the Très Riches Heures du Duc de Berry, representing David thanking God who appears in a halo.
- Other name: "Quare fremuerunt gentes"
- Text: by David
- Language: Hebrew (original)

Psalm 2
- ← Psalm 1 Psalm 3 →
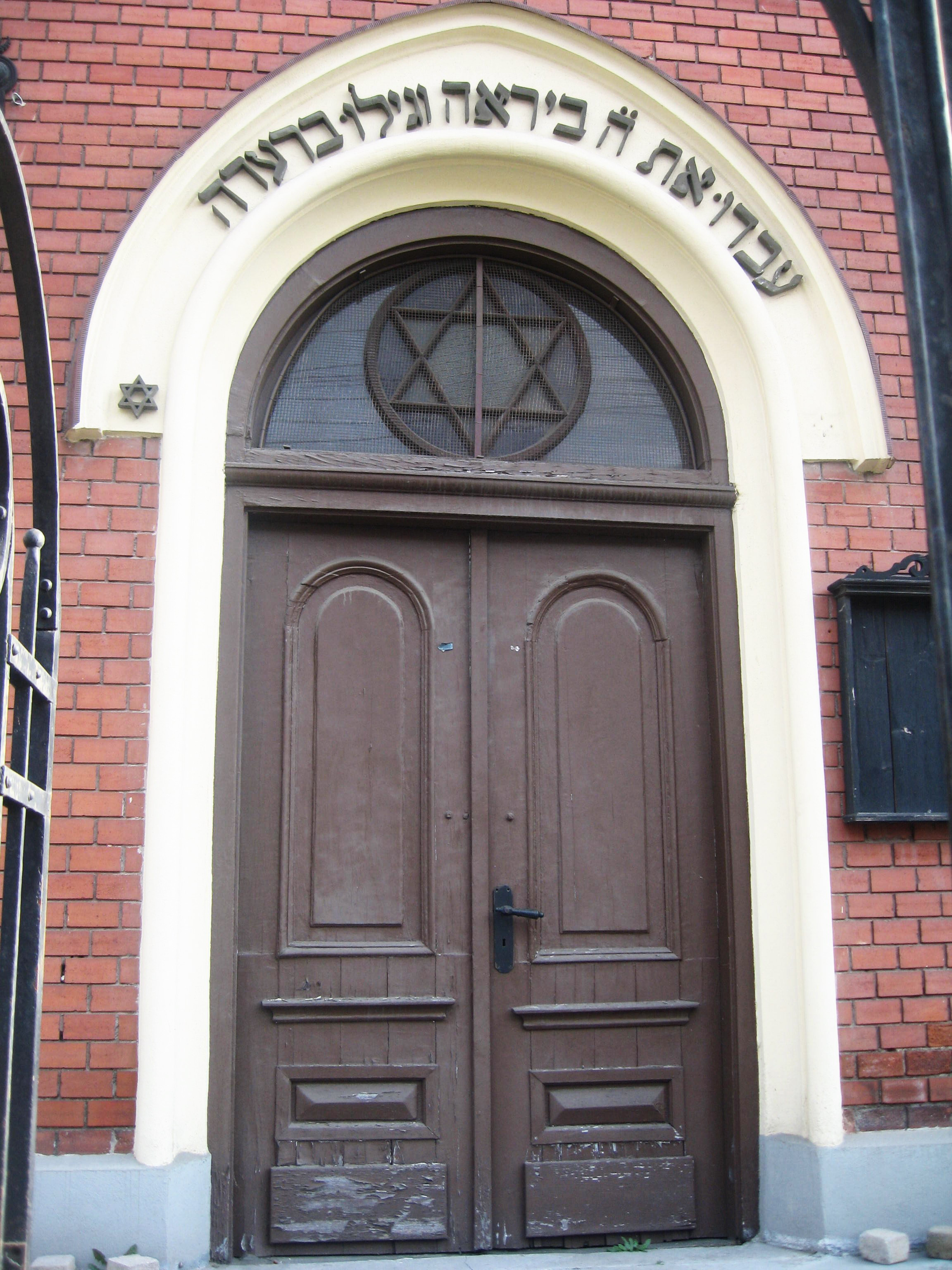
- Psalm 2:11, "Serve the Lord with fear and rejoice with trembling", appears in Hebrew over the entrance to a synagogue in Sibiu, Romania
- Book: Book of Psalms
- Hebrew Bible part: Ketuvim
- Order in the Hebrew part: 1
- Category: Sifrei Emet
- Christian Bible part: Old Testament
- Order in the Christian part: 19

Psalm 2 is the second psalm of the Book of Psalms, beginning in English in the King James Version: "Why do the heathen rage". In Latin, it is known as "Quare fremuerunt gentes". The Book of Psalms is part of the Ketuvim (Writings)—the third section of the Hebrew Bible—and a book of the Christian Old Testament. Psalm 2 does not specify its author with a superscription, but in Acts 4:24–26 of the Christian New Testament, it is attributed to King David. Rabbi Samuel ben Nahman, referencing Rabbi Yochanan, is recorded in tractate Berakhot 10a:1 of the Talmud—the Rabbinic commentary on the Mishnah in Rabbinic Judaism—as teaching that Psalm 2 is a continuation of Psalm 1.

The psalm is a regular part of Jewish, Catholic, Lutheran, and Anglican liturgies, as well as the general Protestant psalmody. It has often been set to music; George Frideric Handel, for example, set nine of its verses in Part II of his Messiah.

== Background and themes ==
=== Judaism ===
According to the Talmud, in tractate Berakhot 9b:28 and 10a:1, Psalm 2 is a continuation of Psalm 1. Tenth-century CE rabbi Saadia Gaon, in his commentary on the Psalms, concurs with the Talmud that Psalm 1 begins with the word "happy" (אַשְׁרֵי, ashrei) and the last verse of Psalm 2 ends with the word "happy", joining them thematically.

Furthermore, Chazal, in tractate Sukkah 52a:6 and tractate Avodah Zarah 3b:5, and later commentators, including Saadia Gaon, Abraham ibn Ezra, and the Karaite Yefet ben Ali, argue that Psalm 1 is messianic in theme, referring to the advent of the Jewish Messiah preceded by the wars of Gog and Magog. In this vein, the "king" of Psalm 2 is interpreted not as David but as the future King Messiah from the Davidic line (Messiah ben David), who will restore Israel to its former glory and bring world peace. Similarly, the Midrash Tehillim teaches:

Three persons were bidden, "Ask"—Solomon, Ahaz, and the King Messiah. Solomon: "Ask what I shall give thee" (I Kings 3:5). Ahaz: "Ask thee a sign" (Isaiah 7:11). The King Messiah: "Ask of Me" (Psalms 2:8).

Rashi and Rabbi David Kimhi (also known as Radak), however, identify the subject of this psalm as David, following his victory over the Philistines. Mariano Gomez Aranda, in a 2018 article in the Journal of Hebrew Scriptures, suggests that Rashi's view was influenced by that of early Christian commentators, who interpreted verse 7 as referring to Jesus.

=== Christianity ===
Some Christian writers, such as Hermann Gunkel, and Hans-Joachim Kraus interpret the psalm as a "song of the Judean king himself at the festival of his accession," while Hossfeld sees the psalm as merely being influenced by Ancient Egyptian and Hellenistic royal ideology. Furthermore, Christian scholars tend to interpret the subject of the psalm as Jesus and his role as the Messiah. Matthew Henry interprets verses 1–6 are viewed as threats against Jesus's kingdom, verses 7–9 as a promise to Jesus to be the head of this kingdom, and verses 10–12 as counsel to all to serve Jesus. Charles Spurgeon and Adam Clarke similarly interpret the psalm as referring to the opposition against Jesus's rulership, the selection of Jesus by God as his "own son", and the eventual victory and reign of Jesus over his enemies.

== Text ==
The following table shows the Hebrew text of the Psalm with vowels and cantillation marks, alongside the English translation from the King James Version, the Latin text in the Vulgate and the Koine Greek text in the Septuagint. Note that the meaning can slightly differ between these versions, as the Septuagint and the Masoretic Text come from different textual traditions. (Note: A 1917 translation directly from Hebrew to English by the Jewish Publication Society can be found here or here, and an 1844 translation directly from the Septuagint by L. C. L. Brenton can be found here. Both translations are in the public domain.)

#	Hebrew	English	Latin	Greek
1	לָ֭מָּה רָגְשׁ֣וּ גוֹיִ֑ם וּ֝לְאֻמִּ֗ים יֶהְגּוּ־רִֽיק׃	Why do the heathen rage, and the people imagine a vain thing?	Quare fremuerunt Gentes, et populi meditati sunt inania?	Ἵνα τί ἐφρύαξαν ἔθνη καὶ λαοὶ ἐμελέτησαν κενά;
2	יִ֥תְיַצְּב֨וּ ׀ מַלְכֵי־אֶ֗רֶץ וְרוֹזְנִ֥ים נֽוֹסְדוּ־יָ֑חַד עַל־יְ֝הֹוָ֗ה וְעַל־מְשִׁיחֽוֹ׃	The kings of the earth set themselves, and the rulers take counsel together, against the Lord, and against his anointed, saying,	Astiterunt reges terræ, et principes convenerunt in unum adversus Dominum, et adversus Christum ejus.	παρέστησαν οἱ βασιλεῖς τῆς γῆς, καὶ οἱ ἄρχοντες συνήχθησαν ἐπὶ τὸ αὐτὸ κατὰ τοῦ Κυρίου καὶ κατὰ τοῦ χριστοῦ αὐτοῦ διάψαλμα
3	נְֽ֭נַתְּקָה אֶת־מֽוֹסְרוֹתֵ֑ימוֹ וְנַשְׁלִ֖יכָה מִמֶּ֣נּוּ עֲבֹתֵֽימוֹ׃	Let us break their bands asunder, and cast away their cords from us.	Dirumpamus vincula eorum: et projiciamus a nobis jugum ipsorum.	Διαρρήξωμεν τοὺς δεσμοὺς αὐτῶν καὶ ἀπορρίψωμεν ἀφ' ἡμῶν τὸν ζυγὸν αὐτῶν.
4	יוֹשֵׁ֣ב בַּשָּׁמַ֣יִם יִשְׂחָ֑ק אֲ֝דֹנָ֗י יִלְעַג־לָֽמוֹ׃	He that sitteth in the heavens shall laugh: the Lord shall have them in derision.	Qui habitat in cælis irridebit eos: et Dominus subsannabit eos.	ὁ κατοικῶν ἐν οὐρανοῖς ἐκγελάσεται αὐτούς, καὶ ὁ Κύριος ἐκμυκτηριεῖ αὐτούς.
5	אָ֤ז יְדַבֵּ֣ר אֵלֵ֣ימוֹ בְאַפּ֑וֹ וּֽבַחֲרוֹנ֥וֹ יְבַהֲלֵֽמוֹ׃	Then shall he speak unto them in his wrath, and vex them in his sore displeasure.	Tunc loquetur ad eos in ira sua, et in furore suo conturbabit eos.	τότε λαλήσει πρὸς αὐτοὺς ἐν ὀργῇ αὐτοῦ καὶ ἐν τῷ θυμῷ αὐτοῦ ταράξει αὐτούς
6	וַ֭אֲנִי נָסַ֣כְתִּי מַלְכִּ֑י עַל־צִ֝יּ֗וֹן הַר־קׇדְשִֽׁי׃	Yet have I set my king upon my holy hill of Zion.	Ego autem constitutus sum rex ab eo super Sion montem sanctum ejus,	Ἐγὼ δὲ κατεστάθην βασιλεὺς ὑπ' αὐτοῦ ἐπὶ Σιων ὄρος τὸ ἅγιον αὐτοῦ
7	אֲסַפְּרָ֗ה אֶֽ֫ל־חֹ֥ק יְֽהֹוָ֗ה אָמַ֘ר אֵלַ֥י בְּנִ֥י אַ֑תָּה אֲ֝נִ֗י הַיּ֥וֹם יְלִדְתִּֽיךָ׃	I will declare the decree: the Lord hath said unto me, Thou art my Son; this day have I begotten thee.	prædicans præceptum ejus. Dominus dixit ad me: Filius meus es tu, ego hodie genui te.	διαγγέλλων τὸ πρόσταγμα Κυρίου Κύριος εἶπεν πρός με Υἱός μου εἶ σύ, ἐγὼ σήμερον γεγέννηκά σε·
8	שְׁאַ֤ל מִמֶּ֗נִּי וְאֶתְּנָ֣ה ג֭וֹיִם נַחֲלָתֶ֑ךָ וַ֝אֲחֻזָּתְךָ֗ אַפְסֵי־אָֽרֶץ׃	Ask of me, and I shall give thee the heathen for thine inheritance, and the uttermost parts of the earth for thy possession.	Postula a me, et dabo tibi Gentes hereditatem tuam, et possessionem tuam terminos terræ.	αἴτησαι παρ' ἐμοῦ, καὶ δώσω σοι ἔθνη τὴν κληρονομίαν σου καὶ τὴν κατάσχεσίν σου τὰ πέρατα τῆς γῆς·
9	תְּ֭רֹעֵם בְּשֵׁ֣בֶט בַּרְזֶ֑ל כִּכְלִ֖י יוֹצֵ֣ר תְּנַפְּצֵֽם׃	Thou shalt break them with a rod of iron; thou shalt dash them in pieces like a potter's vessel.	Reges eos in virga ferrea, et tamquam vas figuli confringes eos.	ποιμανεῖς αὐτοὺς ἐν ῥάβδῳ σιδηρᾷ, ὡς σκεῦος κεραμέως συντρίψεις αὐτούς.
10	וְ֭עַתָּה מְלָכִ֣ים הַשְׂכִּ֑ילוּ הִ֝וָּסְר֗וּ שֹׁ֣פְטֵי אָֽרֶץ׃	Be wise now therefore, O ye kings: be instructed, ye judges of the earth.	Et nunc reges intelligite: erudimini qui judicatis terram.	καὶ νῦν, βασιλεῖς, σύνετε· παιδεύθητε, πάντες οἱ κρίνοντες τὴν γῆν.
11	עִבְד֣וּ אֶת־יְהֹוָ֣ה בְּיִרְאָ֑ה וְ֝גִ֗ילוּ בִּרְעָדָֽה׃	Serve the LORD with fear, and rejoice with trembling.	Servite Domino in timore: et exultate ei cum tremore.	δουλεύσατε τῷ Κυρίῳ ἐν φόβῳ καὶ ἀγαλλιᾶσθε αὐτῷ ἐν τρόμῳ.
12	נַשְּׁקוּ־בַ֡ר פֶּן־יֶאֱנַ֤ף ׀ וְתֹ֬אבְדוּ דֶ֗רֶךְ כִּֽי־יִבְעַ֣ר כִּמְעַ֣ט אַפּ֑וֹ אַ֝שְׁרֵ֗י כׇּל־ח֥וֹסֵי בֽוֹ׃	Kiss the Son, lest he be angry, and ye perish from the way, when his wrath is kindled but a little. Blessed are all they that put their trust in him.	Apprehendite disciplinam nequando irascatur Dominus, et pereatis de via justa. Cum exarserit in brevi ira ejus, beati omnes, qui confidunt in eo.	δράξασθε παιδείας, μήποτε ὀργισθῇ Κύριος καὶ ἀπολεῖσθε ἐξ ὁδοῦ δικαίας. ὅταν ἐκκαυθῇ ἐν τάχει ὁ θυμὸς αὐτοῦ, μακάριοι πάντες οἱ πεποιθότες ἐπ' αὐτῷ.

== Uses ==
=== Judaism ===
Verse 1 is recited during Selichot.

This psalm is also recited to alleviate a headache, and when caught in a sea gale.

=== New Testament ===
Some verses of Psalm 2 are referenced in the New Testament:

- Verses 1-2: in a speech attributed to Peter and John in Acts 4:25–26.
- Verse 7: in Acts 13:33; Hebrews 1:5; Hebrews 5:5.
- Verses 8-9: in Revelation 2:26,27; 12:5; 19:15.

=== Catholic Church ===
According to the Rule of St. Benedict (530 AD), Psalms 1 to 20 were mainly reserved for the office of Prime. This psalm was chosen by St. Benedict of Nursia for Monday's office of Prime: in the Rule of St. Benedict of 530 it was recited or sung between Psalm 1 and Psalm 6.

In the Liturgy of the Hours, Psalm 2 is sung or recited in the Office of Readings of the Sunday of the first week, with Psalm 1 and Psalm 3. Every Tuesday, the faithful of Opus Dei, after invoking their Guardian Angel and kissing the rosary, recite Psalm 2 in Latin.

=== Coptic Orthodox Church ===
In the Agpeya, the Coptic Church's book of hours, this psalm is prayed in the office of Prime.

=== Book of Common Prayer ===
In the Church of England's Book of Common Prayer, Psalm 2 is appointed to be read on the morning of the first day of the month, as well as at Mattins on Easter Day.

=== The Scottish Psalter ===
The Presbyterian Scottish Psalter of 1650 rewords the psalm in a metrical form that can be sung to a tune set to the common meter.

== Musical settings ==
In 1567, Thomas Tallis set Psalm 2, "Why fum'th in sight", for his Nine Tunes for Archbishop Parker's Psalter. Heinrich Schütz wrote a setting of a paraphrase in German, "Was haben doch die Leut im Sinn", SWV 098, for the Becker Psalter, published first in 1628.

Psalm 2 is one of the psalms used in Handel's "Messiah" (HWV 56). He set the King James Version of verses 1–4 and to 9 in four in movement in Part II, beginning with movement 40.

In France, Pierre Robert composed a grand motet "Quare fremuerunt gentes", for the Chapelle Royale in the Louvre. Marc-Antoine Charpentier set around 1675 one " Quare fremuerunt gentes" H.168 - H.168 a, for soloists, double chorus, strings and continuo, another one, for 3 voices, 2 treble instruments and continuo H.184, around 1682. Michel-Richard de Lalande in 1706 made his grand motet (S70) on this Psalm. Jean-Baptiste Lully did the same.

Felix Mendelssohn wrote a setting of Psalm 2 in German during his time as Generalmusicdirektor for church music in Berlin. The setting is for two four part choirs with sections for solo voices and was first performed in Berlin Cathedral on the first day of Christmas 1843. "Warum toben die Heiden" was published as his Op 78 No 1.

Verses 1–4 form one of the texts Leonard Bernstein used for his Chichester Psalms. It is used as counterpart to Psalm 23 in the second movement, sung by the tenors and basses.

Verse 8 of Psalm 2 is used in the song "You Said" by Reuben Morgan.

As part of his five-volume "Revenant Psalms" project, seminary professor Timothy Slemmons paraphrased Psalm 2 in its entirety, and arranged it for a guitar-based setting, entitled "Lagniappe," with alternating 13/4 and 5/4 time signatures.

== References in Second Temple Jewish Literature ==
=== Dead Sea Scrolls ===
- 4Q174: This text, also called 4QFlorilegium, is an explanation (pesher) of several messianic texts. It reads, "Why do the nations conspire, and the peoples plot in vain? The kings of the earth set themselves, and the rulers take counsel together, against the LORD and His anointed (Psalms 2:1). The meaning is that the nations shall set themselves and conspire vainly against the chosen of Israel in the Last Days."
- 1QSA: This reference is debated, and either states "When God has fathered יולד the Messiah among them" or "When God has caused the Messiah to come יולך among them." If the former, it is likely a reference to Psalm 2:7.

=== 1 Enoch ===
There is an apparent reference to Psalm 2 in 1 Enoch, found in 1 Enoch 48:8–10. This text states that "downcast will be the faces of the kings of the earth" who have "denied the Lord of Spirits and his anointed one". The phrase "kings of the earth" and "Lord...and his anointed one" point back to Psalm 2:2.

=== Psalms of Solomon ===
Psalms of Solomon 17 contains a number of shared themes and likely allusions to Psalm 2, including one clear reference in verse 9, found in Psalms or Solomon 17:23–24. Those verses read, "To smash the arrogance of the sinner like a potter’s vessel, to shatter all their substance with an iron rod." Additionally, the phrase "the peoples of the nations to be subject to him under his yoke" may look back to verse 2

== Controversy ==
Some classical Jewish commentators, including Joseph Kara, Abraham ibn Ezra (1st commentary), and David Kimhi, read the word bar as Aramaic and translate the first phrase of verse 12 "Kiss the son"; most English-speaking Protestant Christian versions follow, including Immanuel Tremellius and the King James Version, the latter beginning a trend of capitalizing the word "Son" to reference Jesus. Jerome had considered this translation, as had Herbert of Bosham. Some authors accuse Protestant Christians of arbitrarily choosing to interpret the word as Aramaic to suggest a reference to Jesus Christ. Protestants, however, cite other places in the Bible with isolated Aramaic words found in Hebrew, like the same word bar occurring in Proverbs 31:2.

By contrast, the more common Jewish interpretation of verse 12, reading bar in Hebrew, is "Embrace purity". This is an interpretation close to that of Catholics, who traditionally follow the Vulgate and Septuagint to translate the phrase as "Embrace discipline".

== Illuminated Manuscripts ==
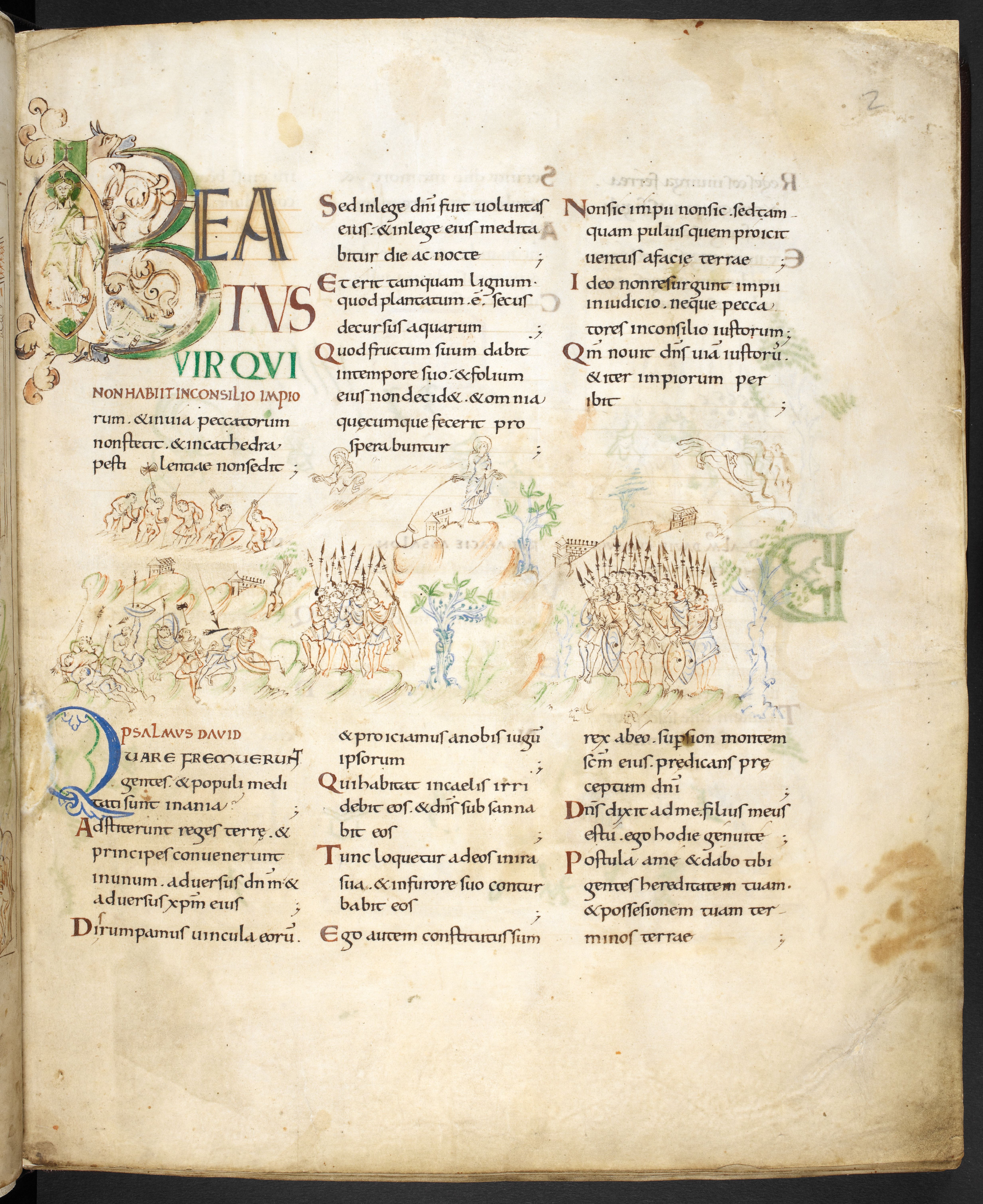
Psalms 1 and 2 in the Harley Psalter

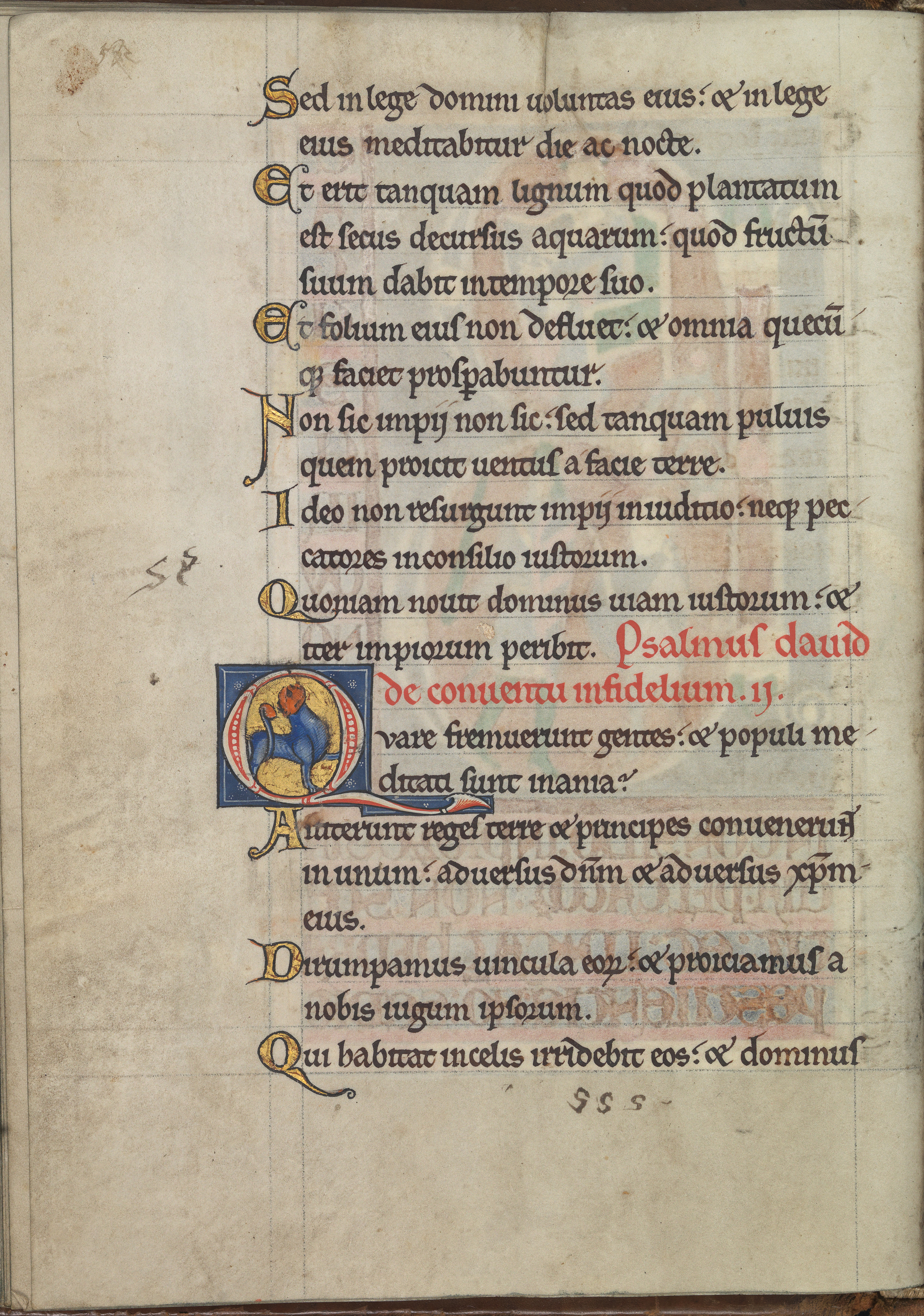
Fecamp Psalter

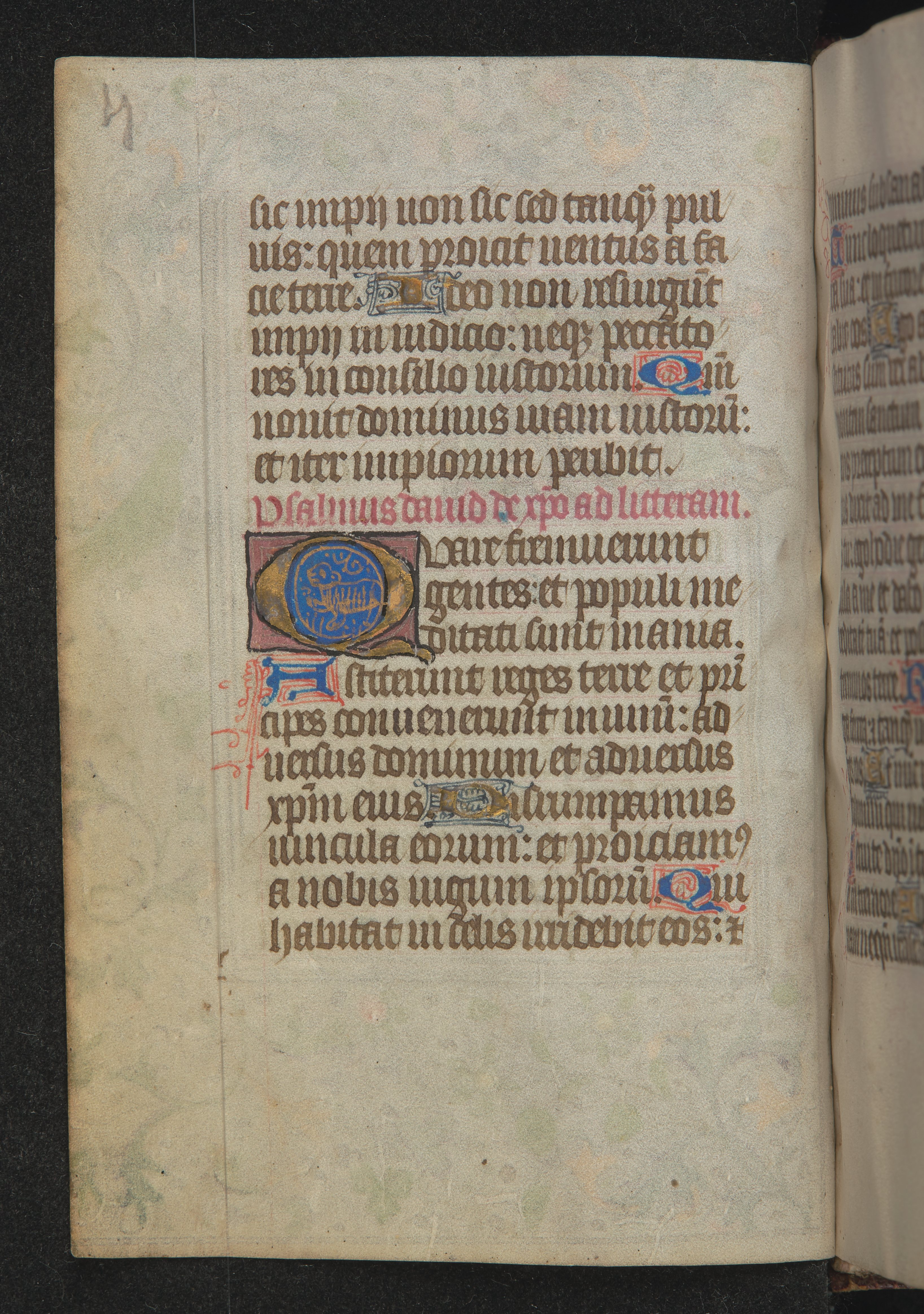
A 15th-century psalter from Bruges

== See also ==
- Anointing
- Blessing
- Heaven
- Old Testament messianic prophecies quoted in the New Testament
- Heathen (Pagan)
- Zion
