= Psalm 5 =

5th psalm of the book of Psalms

- "Give ear to my words, O LORD, consider my meditation."
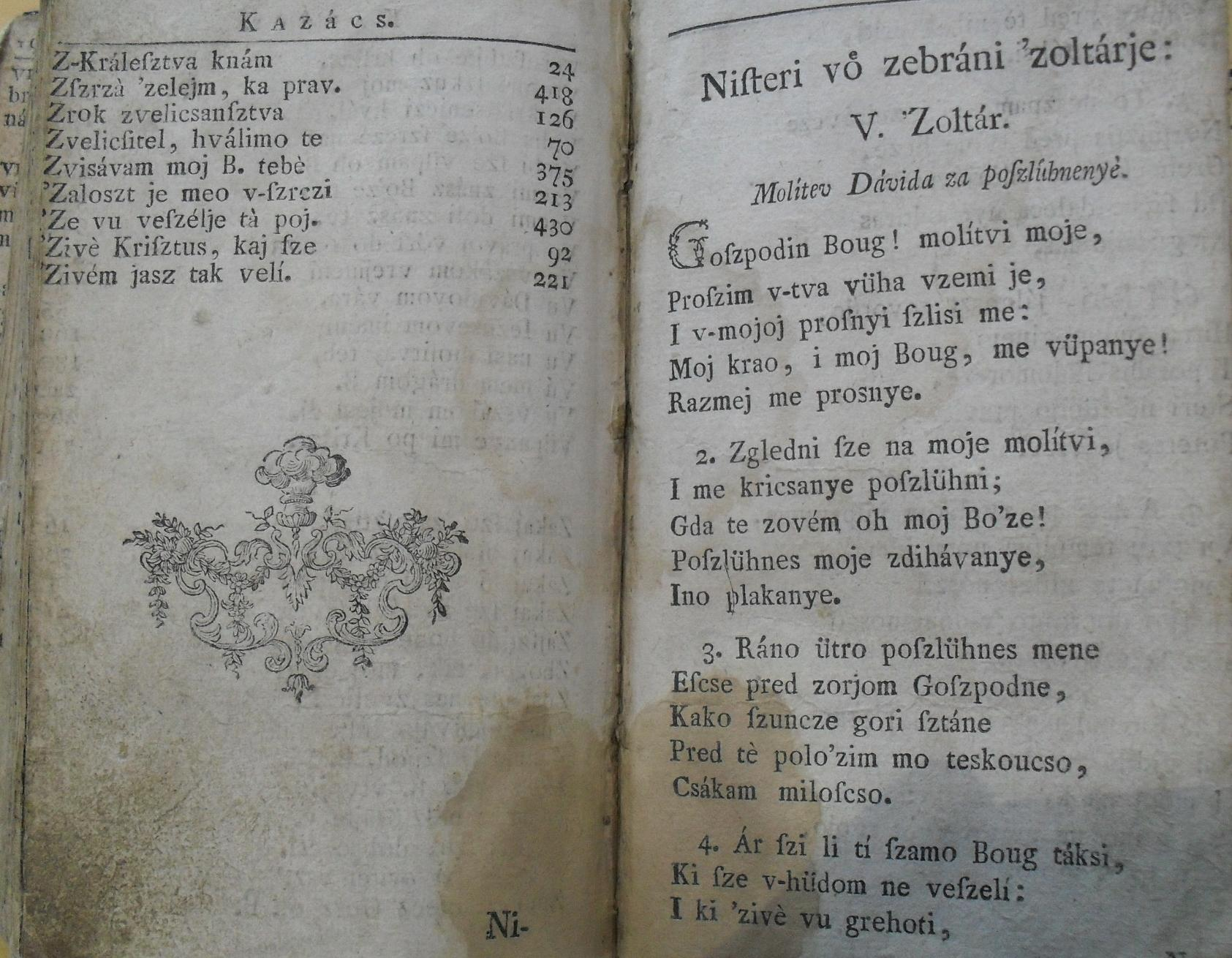
- Psalm 5 in the Prekmurje dialect of Slovene from Nouvi Gráduvál
- Other name: "Verba mea auribus percipe Domine"
- Text: attributed to David
- Language: Hebrew (original)

Psalm 5
- ← Psalm 4 Psalm 6 →
- Book: Book of Psalms
- Hebrew Bible part: Ketuvim
- Order in the Hebrew part: 1
- Category: Sifrei Emet
- Christian Bible part: Old Testament
- Order in the Christian part: 19

Psalm 5 is the fifth psalm of the Book of Psalms, beginning in English in the King James Version: "Give ear to my words, O LORD, consider my meditation". The Book of Psalms is part of the Ketuvim (Writings)—the third section of the Hebrew Bible—and a book of the Christian Old Testament. In Latin, it is known as "Verba mea auribus percipe Domine". The psalm is traditionally attributed to David. It reflects how the righteous pray for deliverance not only from suffering, but also to allow themselves to serve God without distraction. The New King James Version entitles it "A Prayer for Guidance".

The psalm is a regular part of Jewish, Catholic, Lutheran, Anglican and other Protestant liturgies. It has been set to music by composers, such as Heinrich Schütz, Felix Mendelssohn, and Edward Elgar.

== Themes ==
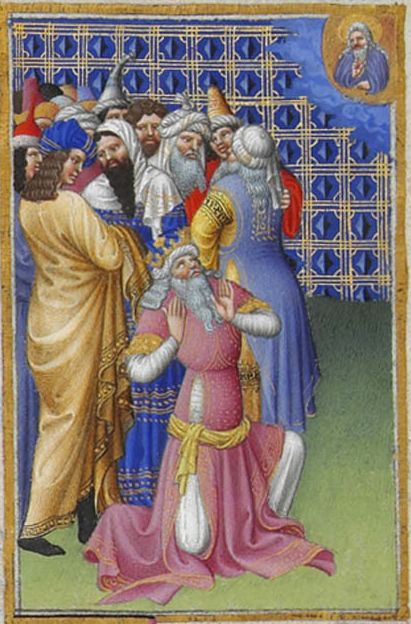
David Beseeches God Against Evildoers.

Psalm 5 falls within the genre of morning prayer because the morning was very important in the religions of the ancient Near East. Hence, verse 4:

In the morning, Lord, you hear my voice; in the morning I lay my requests before you and wait expectantly.

The psalm opens as a lament, continues with praise, and requests that God punish evildoers. The psalmist describes the throat of the wicked as an open sepulcher. The psalmist ends (verse 12 or 13) with a blessing extended to all those who trust in God.

== Interpretation ==
An accurate translation of the Biblical Hebrew word הַנְּחִילֹ֗ות (in the superscription or verse 1) is elusive; the Christian New Revised Standard Version and the Luther Bible give it as "for flute".

The Septuagint, Vulgate and some Arabic translations attribute נחל from "inherit" meaning "per ea quae haereditatem consequitur" (Vulgate) and κληρονομος (Septuagint). Accordingly, it would be translated into English as "in favor of those who receive the inheritance". Therefore Augustine of Hippo, Cassiodorus and others interpreted it as "those heirs of God".

A thoroughly Christological interpretation can be found in Martin Luther's work, in which he finds the third verse revealing that the humanization of humankind occurs through the incarnation of Jesus.

Gerhard Ebeling sees in the psalm both as complaining (verse 10) and also at the same time as exultation and rejoicing (verse 12).

== Context ==
Psalm 5 uses musical instruments, flutes. Psalm 4 is the first psalm using a musical instrument, strings or "stringed instruments".

A new theme is introduced, the name of God, in verse 11:

But let all who take refuge in you rejoice; let them ever sing for joy, and spread your protection over them, that those who love your name may exult in you.

This is the first of five psalms (Psalms 5–9) all speaking of "the name of God", with nine verses speaking to various aspects, namely Psalm 5:11, Psalm 6:5, Psalm 7:17, Psalm 8:1, Psalm 8:9, Psalm 9:2, Psalm 9:5, and Psalm 9:10. Various types of flow in the Book of Psalms are explored by various authors such as O. Palmer Robertson.

An emphasis on a particular genre of psalm, the lament. In Psalm 5:1, God is called on to "listen to my lament." The most common genre of psalm in the book of Psalms will be the lament. Laments can be seen to occur more heavily in the first half of the book of Psalms.

== Text ==
The following table shows the Hebrew text of the Psalm with vowels, alongside the Koine Greek text in the Septuagint and the English translation from the King James Version. Note that the meaning can slightly differ between these versions, as the Septuagint and the Masoretic Text come from different textual traditions. (Note: A 1917 translation directly from Hebrew to English by the Jewish Publication Society can be found here or here, and an 1844 translation directly from the Septuagint by L. C. L. Brenton can be found here. Both translations are in the public domain.)

| # | Hebrew | English | Greek |
|---|---|---|---|
| (Note: In the Jewish verse numbering, the ascription of this psalm is verse 1, and the rest of the psalm begins from verse 2. However, the Christian verse numbering does not count the ascription as a separate verse.) | לַמְנַצֵּ֥חַ אֶֽל־הַנְּחִיל֗וֹת מִזְמ֥וֹר לְדָוִֽד׃ | (To the chief Musician upon Nehiloth, A Psalm of David.) | Εἰς τὸ τέλος, ὑπὲρ τῆς κληρονομούσης· ψαλμὸς τῷ Δαυΐδ. - |
| 1 | אֲמָרַ֖י הַאֲזִ֥ינָה ׀ יְהֹוָ֗ה בִּ֣ינָה הֲגִיגִֽי׃ | Give ear to my words, O LORD, consider my meditation. | ΤΑ ῥήματά μου ἐνώτισαι, Κύριε, σύνες τῆς κραυγῆς μου· |
| 2 | הַקְשִׁ֤יבָה ׀ לְק֬וֹל שַׁוְעִ֗י מַלְכִּ֥י וֵאלֹהָ֑י כִּֽי־אֵ֝לֶ֗יךָ אֶתְפַּלָּֽל׃ | Hearken unto the voice of my cry, my King, and my God: for unto thee will I pray. | πρόσχες τῇ φωνῇ τῆς δεήσεώς μου, ὁ βασιλεύς μου καὶ ὁ Θεός μου. ὅτι πρὸς σὲ προσεύξομαι, Κύριε· |
| 3 | יְֽהֹוָ֗ה בֹּ֭קֶר תִּשְׁמַ֣ע קוֹלִ֑י בֹּ֥קֶר אֶעֱרׇךְ־לְ֝ךָ֗ וַאֲצַפֶּֽה׃ | My voice shalt thou hear in the morning, O LORD; in the morning will I direct my prayer unto thee, and will look up. | τὸ πρωΐ εἰσακούσῃ τῆς φωνῆς μου, τὸ πρωΐ παραστήσομαί σοι καὶ ἐπόψει με, |
| 4 | כִּ֤י ׀ לֹ֤א אֵֽל־חָפֵ֘ץ רֶ֥שַׁע ׀ אָ֑תָּה לֹ֖א יְגֻרְךָ֣ רָֽע׃ | For thou art not a God that hath pleasure in wickedness: neither shall evil dwell with thee. | ὅτι οὐχὶ Θεὸς θέλων ἀνομίαν σὺ εἶ· οὐ παροικήσει σοι πονηρευόμενος, |
| 5 | לֹֽא־יִתְיַצְּב֣וּ ה֭וֹלְלִים לְנֶ֣גֶד עֵינֶ֑יךָ שָׂ֝נֵ֗אתָ כׇּל־פֹּ֥עֲלֵי אָֽוֶן׃ | The foolish shall not stand in thy sight: thou hatest all workers of iniquity. | οὐδὲ διαμενοῦσι παράνομοι κατέναντι τῶν ὀφθαλμῶν σου. ἐμίσησας πάντας τοὺς ἐργαζομένους τὴν ἀνομίαν· |
| 6 | תְּאַבֵּד֮ דֹּבְרֵ֢י כָ֫זָ֥ב אִישׁ־דָּמִ֥ים וּמִרְמָ֗ה יְתָ֘עֵ֥ב ׀ יְהֹוָֽה׃ | Thou shalt destroy them that speak leasing: the LORD will abhor the bloody and deceitful man. | ἀπολεῖς πάντας τοὺς λαλοῦντας τὸ ψεῦδος. ἄνδρα αἱμάτων καὶ δόλιον βδελύσσεται Κύριος. |
| 7 | וַאֲנִ֗י בְּרֹ֣ב חַ֭סְדְּךָ אָב֣וֹא בֵיתֶ֑ךָ אֶשְׁתַּחֲוֶ֥ה אֶל־הֵֽיכַל־קׇ֝דְשְׁךָ֗ בְּיִרְאָתֶֽךָ׃ | But as for me, I will come into thy house in the multitude of thy mercy: and in thy fear will I worship toward thy holy temple. | ἐγὼ δὲ ἐν τῷ πλήθει τοῦ ἐλέους σου εἰσελεύσομαι εἰς τὸν οἶκόν σου, προσκυνήσω πρὸς ναὸν ἅγιόν σου ἐν φόβῳ σου. |
| 8 | יְהֹוָ֤ה ׀ נְחֵ֬נִי בְצִדְקָתֶ֗ךָ לְמַ֥עַן שׁוֹרְרָ֑י (הושר) [הַיְשַׁ֖ר] לְפָנַ֣י דַּרְכֶּֽךָ׃ | Lead me, O LORD, in thy righteousness because of mine enemies; make thy way straight before my face. | Κύριε, ὁδήγησόν με ἐν τῇ δικαιοσύνῃ σου ἕνεκα τῶν ἐχθρῶν μου, κατεύθυνον ἐνώπιόν σου τὴν ὁδόν μου. |
| 9 | כִּ֤י אֵ֪ין בְּפִ֡יהוּ נְכוֹנָה֮ קִרְבָּ֢ם הַ֫וּ֥וֹת קֶֽבֶר־פָּת֥וּחַ גְּרֹנָ֑ם לְ֝שׁוֹנָ֗ם יַחֲלִיקֽוּן׃ | For there is no faithfulness in their mouth; their inward part is very wickedness; their throat is an open sepulchre; they flatter with their tongue. | ὅτι οὐκ ἔστιν ἐν τῷ στόματι αὐτῶν ἀλήθεια, ἡ καρδία αὐτῶν ματαία· τάφος ἀνεῳγμένος ὁ λάρυγξ αὐτῶν, ταῖς γλώσσαις αὐτῶν ἐδολιοῦσαν. |
| 10 | הַ֥אֲשִׁימֵ֨ם ׀ אֱֽלֹהִ֗ים יִפְּלוּ֮ מִֽמֹּעֲצ֢וֹתֵ֫יהֶ֥ם בְּרֹ֣ב פִּ֭שְׁעֵיהֶם הַדִּיחֵ֑מוֹ כִּי־מָ֥רוּ בָֽךְ׃ | Destroy thou them, O God; let them fall by their own counsels; cast them out in the multitude of their transgressions; for they have rebelled against thee. | κρῖνον αὐτούς, ὁ Θεός. ἀποπεσάτωσαν ἀπὸ τῶν διαβουλιῶν αὐτῶν· κατὰ τὸ πλῆθος τῶν ἀσεβειῶν αὐτῶν ἔξωσον αὐτούς, ὅτι παρεπίκρανάν σε, Κύριε. |
| 11 | וְיִשְׂמְח֨וּ כׇל־ח֪וֹסֵי בָ֡ךְ לְעוֹלָ֣ם יְ֭רַנֵּנוּ וְתָסֵ֣ךְ עָלֵ֑ימוֹ וְֽיַעְלְצ֥וּ בְ֝ךָ֗ אֹהֲבֵ֥י שְׁמֶֽךָ׃ | But let all those that put their trust in thee rejoice: let them ever shout for joy, because thou defendest them: let them also that love thy name be joyful in thee. | καὶ εὐφρανθείησαν πάντες οἱ ἐλπίζοντες ἐπὶ σέ· εἰς αἰῶνα ἀγαλλιάσονται, καὶ κατασκηνώσεις ἐν αὐτοῖς, καὶ καυχήσονται ἐν σοὶ πάντες οἱ ἀγαπῶντες τὸ ὄνομά σου. |
| 12 | כִּֽי־אַתָּה֮ תְּבָרֵ֢ךְ צַ֫דִּ֥יק יְהֹוָ֑ה כַּ֝צִּנָּ֗ה רָצ֥וֹן תַּעְטְרֶֽנּוּ׃ | For thou, LORD, wilt bless the righteous; with favour wilt thou compass him as with a shield. | ὅτι σὺ εὐλογήσεις δίκαιον· Κύριε, ὡς ὅπλῳ εὐδοκίας ἐστεφάνωσας ἡμᾶς. |

== Uses ==
=== Judaism ===
In Judaism, verse 8 of Psalm 5 is the second verse of Ma Tovu.

=== New Testament ===
Verse 9 is quoted in Romans 3:13.

=== Catholic Church ===
According to the Rule of St. Benedict, from 530, Psalm 1 to Psalm 20 were mainly reserved for office of Prime. Since the time of Saint Benedict, the Rule of Benedict has used this psalm for the office Lauds on Monday (Chapter XIII). In the Liturgy of the Hours, Psalm 5 is still recited or sung at Lauds on Monday of the first week.

=== Coptic Orthodox Church ===
In the Agpeya, the Coptic Church's book of hours, this psalm is prayed in the office of Prime.

=== Book of Common Prayer ===
In the Church of England's Book of Common Prayer, Psalm 5 is appointed to be read on the morning of the first day of the month.

=== Music ===
Caspar cross Hamer (1546) created in 1537 the chorale An geystlich Bitlied drawn heavily from the Psalms.

Heinrich Schütz composed a setting of a metred version in German, "Herr, hör, was ich will bitten dich", SWV 101, published in 1628 in the Becker Psalter. Felix Mendelssohn composed a setting of Psalm 5 in English, "Lord, hear the voice," for men's chorus in 1839. In 1911, Edward Elgar dedicated a setting for choir and orchestra, "Intende voci orationis meæ", as an offertory for the coronation of King George V.

== Illuminated Manuscripts ==
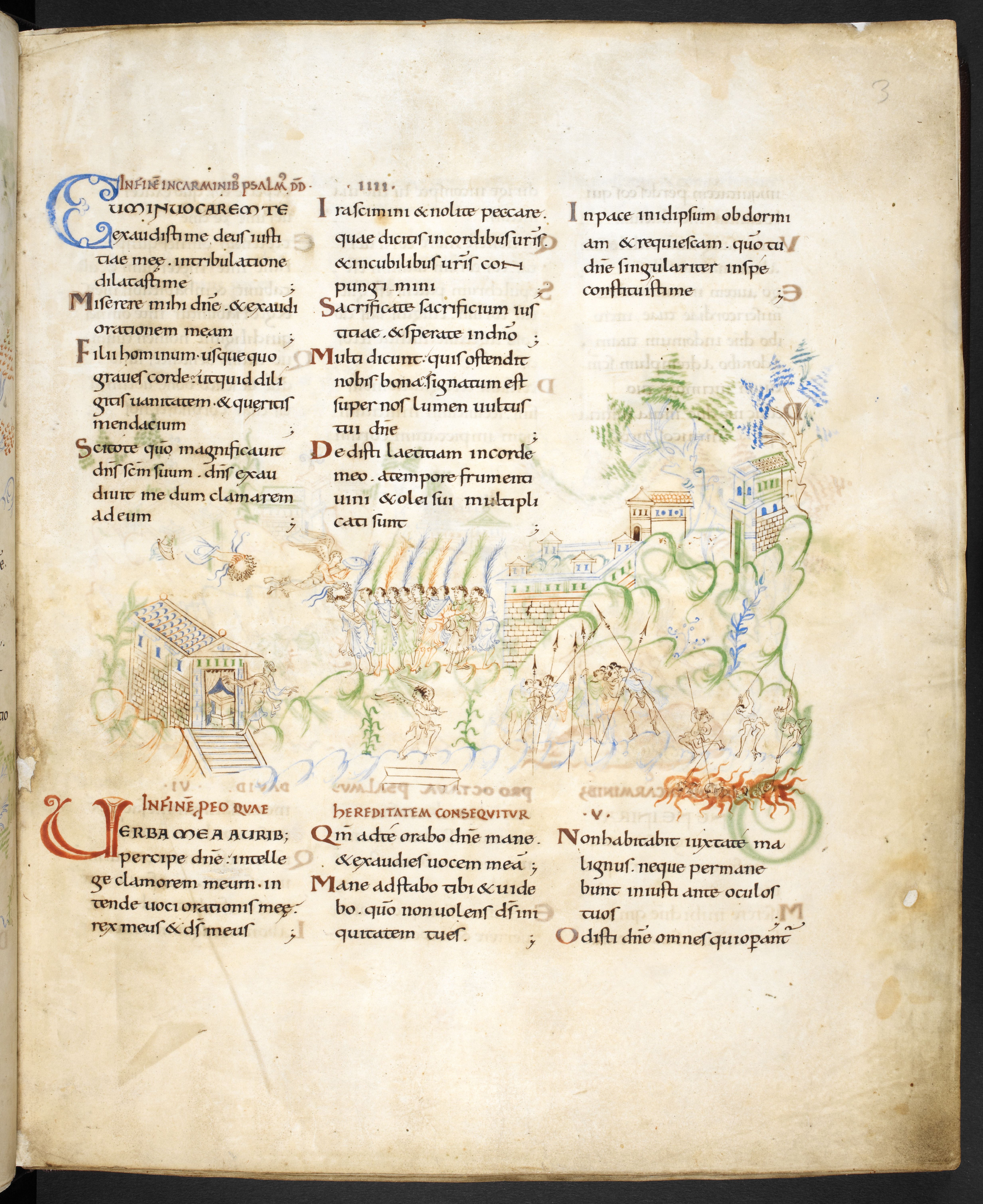
The beginning of Psalm 5 in the Harley Psalter.

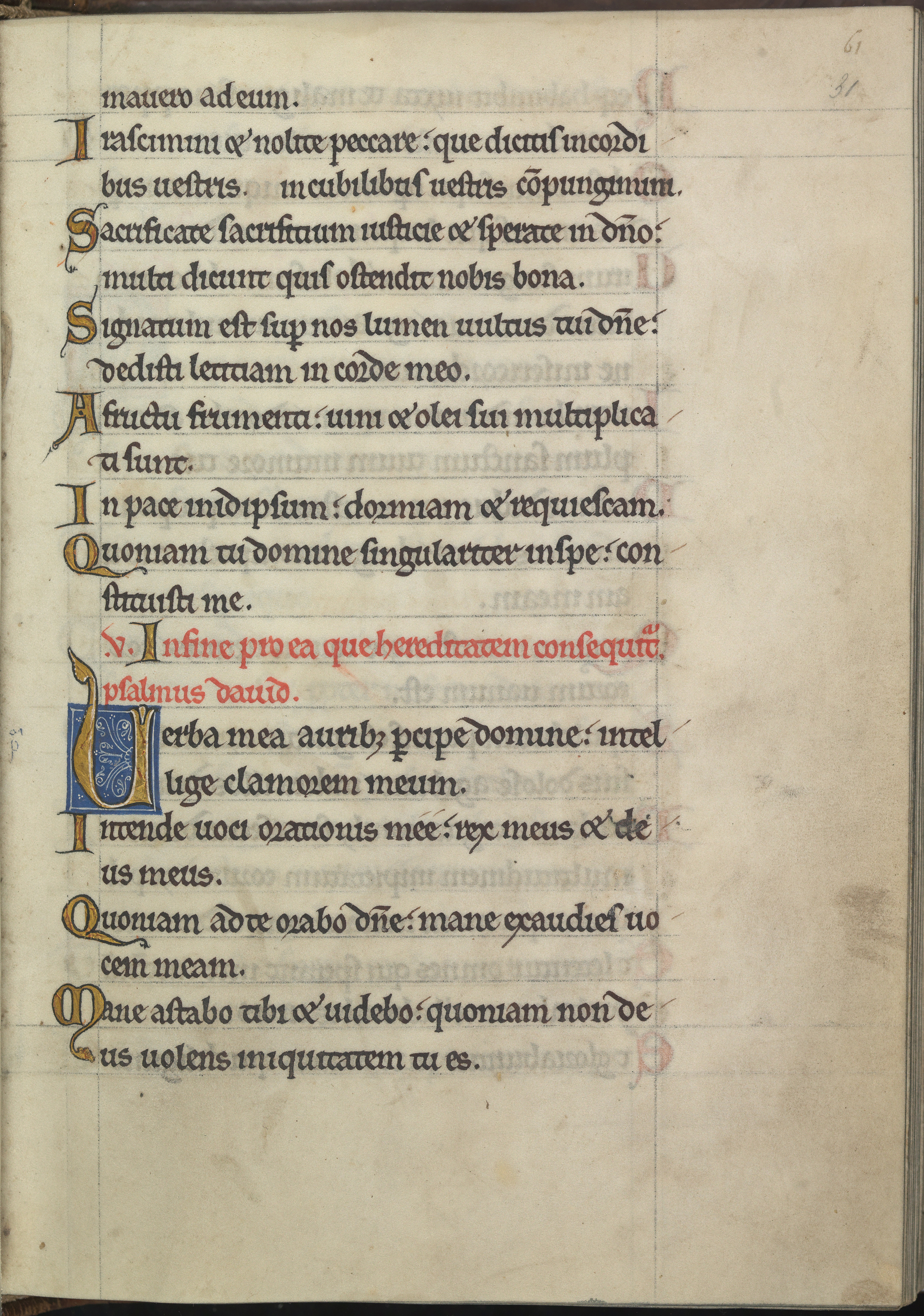
The beginning of Psalm 5 in the Psalter of Eleanor of Aquitaine.

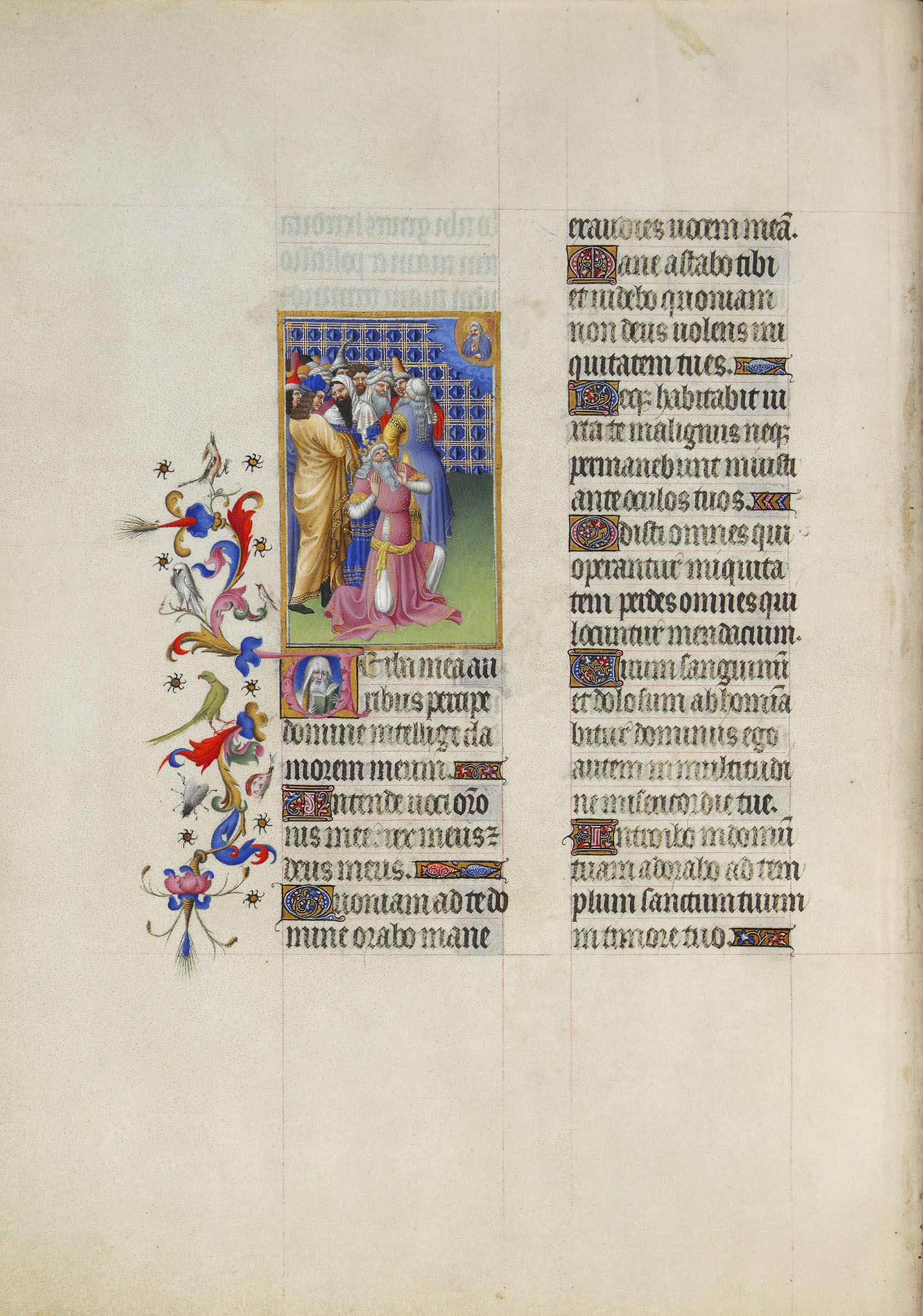
Psalm 5 in the Très Riches Heures du Duc de Berry, with miniature of King David beseeching God against evildoers.
