= Selah =

Biblical Hebrew word of uncertain meaning

Selah (/ˈsiːlə(h)/; Biblical Hebrew: סֶלָה, romanized: selā) is a word used 74 times in the Hebrew Bible. Its etymology and precise meaning are unknown, though various interpretations have been proposed.

It is probably either a liturgical-musical mark or an instruction for reading the text, meaning "stop and listen". Another proposal is that selah can be used to indicate that there is to be a musical interlude at that point in the Psalm. It can also be interpreted as a form of underlining in preparation for the next paragraph.

It should not be confused with the Hebrew word sela' (סֶלַע), meaning "rock".

== Occurrences ==
This word occurs 71 times in 39 of the Psalms, and three times in Habakkuk 3: altogether 74 times in the Bible. It is found at the end of Psalms 3, 24, and 46, and in most other cases at the end of a verse, the exceptions being Psalms 55:19, 57:3, and Habakkuk 3:3, 9, 13.

At least some of the Psalms were sung accompanied by musical instruments and there are references to this in many chapters. Thirty-one of the thirty-nine psalms with the caption "To the choir-master" include the word selah.

== Interpretations ==
=== Historical ===
The significance of this term was apparently not known even by ancient Biblical commentators. This can be seen by the variety of renderings given to it. The Septuagint, Symmachus, and Theodotion translate it as διάψαλμα (diapsalma, or "apart from psalm") — a word as enigmatic in Greek as is selah in Hebrew. The Hexapla simply transliterates it as σελ (sel). Aquila, Jerome, and the Targum translate it as "always", and in Jewish liturgy the word is used to mean "forever" (notably in the second to last blessing of the Amidah).

According to Hippolytus, the Greek term διάψαλμα signified a change in rhythm or melody at the places marked by the term, or a change in thought and theme. Against this explanation, Baethgen notes that selah also occurs at the end of some psalms.

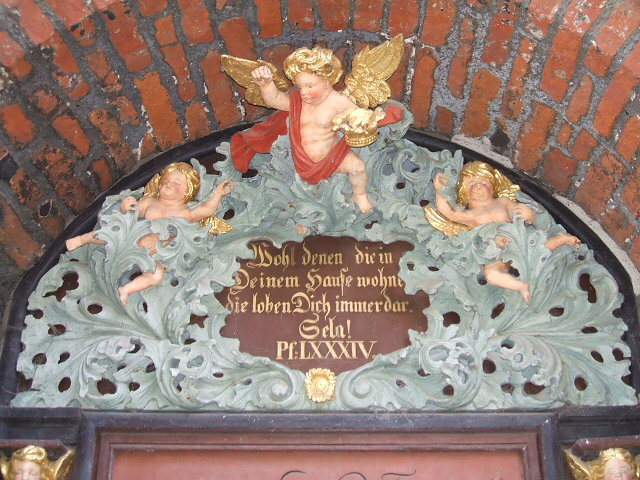
"Sela" on a tympanum of St Nicholas Church, in Stralsund, Germany

=== Modern (1900s) ===
==== Imperative: "lift up", "exalt"; pause ====
One proposed meaning assigns it to the root סלל, as an imperative that should properly have been vocalized סֹלָּה, sollah. The meaning of this imperative is given as "lift up", equivalent to "loud" or "fortissimo", a direction to the accompanying musicians to break in at the place marked with crash of cymbals and blare of trumpets, the orchestra playing an interlude while the singers' voices were hushed. The effect, as far as the singer was concerned, was to mark a pause. Similarly, another opinion understands selah being held to be a variant of the verb shelah (meaning "pause"). But as the interchange of shin (ש) and samekh (ס) is not usual in Biblical Hebrew, and as the meaning "pause" is not held to be applicable in the middle of a verse, or where a pause would interrupt the sequence of thought, this proposition has met with little favor.

The Brown-Driver-Briggs Hebrew and English Lexicon (2006) states that the main derivation of the Hebrew word selah is found through the fientive verb root סֶ֜לָה which means "to lift up (voices)" or "to exalt", and also carries a close connotational relationship to the verb סָלַל, which is similar in meaning: "to lift up" or "to cast up". The word סֶלָה, which shifts the accent back to the last syllable of the verb form, indicates that in this context, the verb is being used in the imperative mood as somewhat of a directive to the reader. As such, perhaps the most instructive way to view the use of this word, particularly in the context of the Psalms, would be as the writer's instruction to the reader to pause and exalt the Lord.

==== Marker between paragraphs or of a quotation ====
Heinrich Grätz argues that selah introduces a new paragraph, and also in some cases a quotation (e.g., Psalms 57:8-12 from 108:2-6). The fact that the term occurs four times at the end of a Psalm would not weigh against this theory. The Psalms were meant to be read in sequence, and, moreover, many of them are fragments; indeed, Psalms 9 and 10 are considered one psalm in the Septuagint; the Septuagint also omits the word διάψαλμα (diapsalma, "pause") at the end of Psalms 3, 24, 46 and 68.

B. Jacob concludes (1) that since no etymological explanation is possible, selah signifies a pause in or for the Temple song; and (2) that its meaning was concealed lest the Temple privileges should be obtained by the synagogues or perhaps even by the churches.

==== Other proposals ====
Another interpretation claims that selah comes from the primary Hebrew root word salah (סָלָה), meaning "to hang", and by implication "to measure (weigh)".

== Philosophy ==
The term selah is used by the Czech philosopher John Amos Comenius (1592–1670) at the end of his book Kšaft umírající matky, Jednoty bratrské. Likewise, selah appears several times in the Wanderer and Shadow's song in Among the Daughters of the Desert from Nietzsche's Thus Spoke Zarathustra. Eliphas Levi (1810–1875), in his work "Transcendental Magic", says "Selah! Fiat! So mote it be!" at the end of one of his magical invocations of the elemental spirits.

== Rastafari usage ==
Selah is used in Iyaric Rastafarian vocabulary. It can be heard at the end of spoken-word segments of some reggae songs. Its usage here, again, is to accentuate the magnitude and importance of what has been said, and often is a sort of substitute for amen.

== As a given name ==
"Selah" has been used as a female given name in the US since 2005. In 2024, the name reached 280th place in the US, with 1122 recorded births. The name has also seen usage in the Netherlands, reaching 481st place in 2016, with 26 births, and 467th place in 2024, with 28 births.

== Institutions named Selah ==
- The Selah Workshop of the Israel Center for Jewish-Christian Relations, Galilee, Israel
- Selah: The Israel Crisis Management Center, helps "immigrants [to Israel] struggling with tragedy"

== See also ==
- Jewish prayer
- List of Jewish prayers and blessings
- Salah (Muslim prayer)
- Selah, Washington
- Selah (band)
- Selah (biblical figure)
- Saleh (prophet)
- Saleh (given name)
