= Prime (liturgy) =

Canonical hour at first hour of daylight in liturgy

Prime, or the First Hour, is one of the canonical hours of the Divine Office, said at the first hour of daylight (6:00 a.m. at the equinoxes but earlier in summer, later in winter), between the dawn hour of Lauds and the 9 a.m. hour of Terce. It remains part of the Liturgy of Eastern Christianity, but suppressed within the Roman rite by the Second Vatican Council, although a number of monastic communities and clerical institutes continue to use it as they do the rest of the preconciliar Roman rite. In the Coptic Church, a denomination of Oriental Orthodox Christianity, the office of Prime is prayed at 6 am in eastward direction of prayer by all members in this denomination, both clergy and laity, being one of the seven fixed prayer times. Roman Catholic clergy under obligation to celebrate the Liturgy of the Hours may still fulfil their obligation by using the edition of the Roman Breviary promulgated by Pope John XXIII in 1962, which contains Prime. Like all the liturgical hours, except the Office of Readings, it consists mainly of Psalms. It is one of the Little Hours.

== Name ==
From the time of the early Church, the practice of seven fixed prayer times have been taught; in Apostolic Tradition, Hippolytus instructed Christians to pray seven times a day "on rising, at the lighting of the evening lamp, at bedtime, at midnight" and "the third, sixth and ninth hours of the day, being hours associated with Christ's Passion." With respect to praying in the early morning, Hippolytus wrote: "Likewise, at the hour of the cock-crow, rise and pray. Because at this hour, with the cock-crow, the children of Israel refused Christ, who we know through faith, hoping daily in the hope of eternal light in the resurrection of the dead."

The word "Prime" comes from Latin and refers to the first hour of daylight (that which begins at sunrise). John Cassian (c. 360 – c. 435) describes it as matutina (hora), ("a" or "the") "morning hour" (translated also as "Mattins"), a description applied also, according to Alardus Gazaeus even by Cassian, to the dawn hour of Lauds. Benedict of Nursia (c. 480 − c. 547) refers to Prime by using the term "primae tempore" ("the time of First Hour") for Prime and uses matutino tempore ("morning time") to speak of Lauds, reckoning Lauds as the first of the seven daytime offices, which he associates with Psalm 118/119:164, "Seven times a day I praise you for your righteous rules", and which he distinguishes from the one nocturnal office of Night Watch, which he links with Psalm 118/119:62, "At midnight I rise to praise you, because of your righteous rules",

In the Antiphonary of Bangor (perhaps c. 700) what is generally called prima (hora) is called secunda. F.E. Warren states: "'Secunda' as the equivalent of 'Prima', the usual title of the first of the Day-Hours is a very ancient title, but has now gone out of use. It is found in the Missale Gallicanum (p. 179), also in C.C.C.C. MS.272, a ninth century Rheims Psalter".

In the Eastern liturgies, the names for this office in the various languages mean "first (hour)".

== Origin ==
John Cassian states that this canonical hour originated in his own time and in his own monastery in Bethlehem, where he lived as a novice: "hanc matitutinam canonicam functionem nostro tempore in nostro quoque monasterio primitus institutam." ("was appointed as a canonical office in our own day, and also in our own monastery, where our Lord Jesus Christ was born of a Virgin and deigned to submit to growth in infancy as man, and where by His Grace He supported our own infancy, still tender in religion, and, as it were, fed with milk"). Jules Pargoire concluded that the institution of Prime must be placed towards 382. Fernand Cabrol identified the monastery in question as "not St. Jerome's monastery at Bethlehem, but another, perhaps one established beyond the Tower of Ader (or of the Flock) beyond the village of the Shepherds, and consequently beyond the modern Beth-saour; it has been identified either with Deïr-er-Raouat (convent of the shepherds) or with Seiar-er-Ganhem (enclosure of the sheep)".

Cassian says this office was instituted because a period of rest was allowed after the nocturnal office and the office said shortly after it, but some monks abused this time of rest by staying in their cells and their beds right up to the time for Terce, and it was therefore decided to have a sunrise office that, moreover, brought the daylight offices to seven in line with Psalm 118/119:164, quoted above in connection with the Rule of Saint Benedict.

== Western Church ==
Fernand Cabrol says that Prime originally used only to contain a repetition of the Lauds Psalms 1, 57 (58), and 89 (90), but the monasteries that gradually adopted the new office changed its constitution as they liked. In spite of the many variations, one characteristic feature is the recitation of the Athanasian Creed. Saint Benedict assigns to Prime on Sundays four groups of eight verses of Ps. 118 (119), and on week-days three psalms, beginning with the first and continuing to Ps. 19 (20), taking three psalms each day (Pss. 9 (10) and 17 (18) being divided into two). This makes Prime like the other Little Hours of the day, which it resembles these in accompanying the psalms with a hymn, an antiphon, capitulum, versicle, and prayer. The Roman Breviary as decreed by Pope Pius V in 1568 in line with the decrees of the Council of Trent, assigns to Prime on Sunday of Pss. 53 (54), 117 (118) and the first four groups of eight verses of Ps. 118 (119); on each of the weekdays it assigns the same psalms as on Sunday except that it replaces Psalm 117 (118) with one of the Psalms from 21 (22) through 25 (26), which had previously all been at Sunday Prime. Each day therefore had in Prime two full psalms and the same two portions of Psalm 118 (119). The late 1911 reform of the Roman Breviary by Pope Pius X changed the psalmody radically, dividing several psalms into shorter portions. To Prime it assigned each day three psalms or portions of psalms, each day different.

To these elements, which make Prime similar to the other Little Hours, Prime adds some prayers that are called the office of the chapter: the reading of the martyrology, the prayer Sancta Maria et omnes sancti ("May holy Mary and all the Saints"), a prayer concerning work, Respice in servos tuos ... Dirigere et sanctificare ("Look upon thy servants ... Direct and sanctify"), and a blessing. The fact that the monastic communities originally after Prime betook themselves to manual work or study is reflected in the prayer for the work ... et opera manuum nostrarum dirige super nos et opus manuum nostrarum dirige ("... and direct thou the works of our hands over us; yea, the work of our hands do thou direct"), and the prayer Dirigere. Later the reading of the martyrology, the necrology, the rule, and a prayer for the dead were added.

The Church of England's Book of Common Prayer dropped Prime with its first 1549 edition. A proposed 1928 version that Parliament rejected would have restored Prime, with the instruction that it be used in addition to (not instead of) Matins, and with optional reciting of the Athanasian Creed.

== Eastern Christianity ==
=== Byzantine Rite ===
In the Eastern Orthodox and Greek Catholic Churches the office of the First Hour is normally read by a single Reader and has very little variation in it. Three fixed psalms are read at the First Hour: Psalms 5, 89, and 100 (LXX). The only variable portions for most of the year are the Troparia (either one or two) and Kontakion of the Day. Whereas the other Little Hours are normally followed by other services, the First Hour is normally read immediately after Matins and so it is concluded with a dismissal by the priest. In the Russian usage, the dismissal is followed by a hymn to the Theotokos (the Kontakion of the Annunciation, Tone 8):

"To thee, the champion leader, we thy servants dedicate a feast of victory and of thanksgiving, as ones rescued out of sufferings, O Theotokos; but as thou art one with might which is invincible, from all dangers that can be do thou deliver us, that we may cry to thee: Rejoice, thou Bride Unwedded!"

==== Variations ====
During Great Lent a number of changes in the office take place. On Tuesday, Wednesday and Thursday, after the three fixed psalms, the Reader says a kathisma from the Psalter. The Troparion of the Day is replaced by special Lenten hymns that are chanted with prostrations. Then the psalm verses that follow the Theotokion, which are normally read, are instead sung by the choir. The Kontakion is also replaced by special Lenten hymns which are sung. Near the end of the Hour, the Prayer of St. Ephraim is said, with prostrations.

On Monday, Wednesday, and Friday of the Fourth Week of Great Lent, the Veneration of the Cross takes place at the First Hour.

During the Fifth Week of Great Lent, there is a kathisma only on Tuesday and Wednesday, due to the reading of the Great Canon of Saint Andrew of Crete on Thursday morning. If, however, the Great Feast of the Annunciation falls on that particular Thursday, the reading of the Great Canon will be moved to Tuesday and, as a result, a kathisma will be read on Monday, Wednesday and Thursday.

During Holy Week, on Monday, Tuesday and Wednesday, the services are similar to those during Great Lent except there is no reading of Kathismata, and instead of the normal Lenten hymns which replace the Kontakion, the Kontakion of the day (i.e., that day of Holy Week) is chanted. On Great Thursday and Saturday, the Little Hours are more like normal, except that a Troparion of the Prophecy, prokeimena, and a reading from Jeremiah are chanted at the First Hour on Great Thursday. On Great Friday, the Royal Hours are chanted.

During the Lesser Lenten seasons (Nativity Fast, Apostles' Fast and Dormition Fast) the Little Hours undergo changes similar to those during Great Lent, except the hymns are usually read instead of chanted, and there are no kathismata on weekdays. In addition, on weekdays of the Lesser Fasts, the Inter-Hour (Greek: Mesorion) may be read immediately after the First Hour (at least on the first day of the Fast). The Inter-Hours follow the same general outline as the Little Hours, except they are shorter. When the Inter-Hour follows the First Hour, the dismissal is said at the end of the Inter-Hour rather than at the end of the First Hour.

When the Royal Hours are chanted (the Eve of Nativity, the Eve of Theophany and Great Friday), the First Hour is not joined to Matins as normal, but it becomes the first office in an aggregated office composed of the First, Third, Sixth and Ninth Hours and the Typica. This is the most elaborate form of the First Hour. Both the priest and deacon are vested and serve, and the Gospel Book is set on an analogion (lectern) in the center of the temple (church building). At the beginning of the First Hour, the deacon performs a full censing of the church, clergy and faithful. Two of the three fixed psalms (89 and 100) are replaced by others that are appropriate to the particular feast day being celebrated. A number of hymns (stichera) are sung in place of the Troparion of the Day. Then a prokeimenon, the reading of a relevant Old Testament prophecy, an Epistle and a Gospel are chanted. The Kontakion of the Day is chanted by the choir, instead of being read. Since at the Royal Hours other services immediately follow the First Hour, there is no dismissal.

=== Oriental Orthodox ===
The various Oriental Orthodox and Oriental Catholic Rites vary in the particulars of the First Hour, but in general tend to have a larger number of psalms in them. In some Rites it is the practice to recite the entire Psalter once a day (as opposed to once a week, as in the Western and Constantinopolitan Rites).

==== Armenian Liturgy ====
In the Armenian Liturgy, the office following the Morning Hour is called the Sunrise Hour (Armenian: Արեւագալ Ժամ arevagal zham). The Armenian Book of Hours (Zhamagirk') states that this service is dedicated "to the Holy Spirit and to the resurrection of Christ and to [his] appearance to the disciples."

Outline of the service

Introduction: "Blessed is our Lord Jesus Christ. Amen. Our father..."

First station: Psalm 72:17-19 "Glory...Now and Ever...Amen." "Again and again in peace...Accept, save, and have mercy." "Blessing and glory to the Father...Amen." Sunrise Hymn attributed to St Nerses: "From the East...(Arewelits'...)" Exhortation: "From the East unto the West, children of Sion..." Proclamation of Sunrise, to follow the hymn and the canon, composed by Giwt: "From the East unto the West in all parts of Christendom..." Prayer: "From the East unto the West you are praised..."

Second station: Psalm 100: "Rejoice in the Lord all the earth..." Hymn: "Ascetics of God...(Chgnawork' Astoutsoy...)" Exhortation: "True ascetics, witnesses of Christ...(Chgnawork' chshmaritk' vkayk' K'ristosi...)" Supplication: "We entreat [you]...(Aghach'emk'...)" Proclamation: "Through the holy ascetics...(Sourb chgnaworawk'n...)" Prayer: "Holy are you, Lord...(Sourb es Tēr...)" "Remember your ministers..." "Beneficent and plenteous in mercy..."

Third station: Psalms 63, 64 "Glory...Now and always...Amen." Hymn: "Light, creator of light...(Loys ararich' lousoy...)" Exhortation: "Uncreated God...(Aneghanelid Astouats...)" Supplication: "By your light...(Lousovd...)" Proclamation: "And again in peace...Let us glorify..." Prayer: "Accept out morning prayer...(Zarawawtou...)"

Fourth station: Psalms 23, 143:8-12, 46:1-7, 70, 86:16-17 "Glory...Now and always...Amen." Hymn: "Way and truth...(Chanaparh ew chshmartout'iwn...)" Exhortation: "Christ the good way...(Chanaparh bari K'ristos...)" Supplication: "Lord, make straight our steps...(Tēr, oughghya zgnats's mer...)" Proclamation: "Let us beseech almighty God...("Aghach'ests'ouk' zamenakaln Astouats...)" Prayer: "Guide of life...(Arajnord kenats'...)" but during fasts on days when there is no commemoration: Prayer: "Blessed are you, Lord God...(Awrhneal es Tēr Astouats...)"

Conclusion: "Blessed is our Lord Jesus Christ. Amen. Our father..."

This service remains unchanged throughout the liturgical year, with the exception of the last prayer.

==== Coptic Orthodox Church of Alexandria ====
In the Coptic Orthodox Church, an Oriental Orthodox denomination, the prayer time of Prime is prayed at 6 am using the Agpeya breviary.

=== East Syriac ===
The following are the seven times of prayer in the East Syriac (Edessan and Persian) ritual tradition:

- Ramsha (ܪܲܡܫܵܐ) or the Evening Liturgy (6 pm)
- Suba-a (ܣܘܼܒܵܥܵܐ) or the Supper Liturgy (9 pm)
- Lelya (ܠܸܠܝܵܐ) or the Night Liturgy (12 am)
- Qala d-Shahra ( ܩܵܠܵܐ ܕܫܲܗܪܵ ) or the Vigil Liturgy (3 am)
- Sapra (ܨܲܦܪܵܐ) or the Morning Liturgy (6 am)
- Quta'a (ܩܘܼܛܵܥܵܐ) or the Third Hour Liturgy (9 am)
- Endana (ܥܸܕܵܢܵܐ) or the Noon Liturgy (12 pm)
- D-Bathsha Shayin at 3:00 pm.

== See also ==
- Canonical Hours
- Liturgy of the Hours
