= Liber Orationum Psalmographus =

Catholic prayer book

Liber Orationum Psalmographus (LOP), subtitled The Psalter Collects of the Ancient Hispanic Rite (that is Mozarabic Rite) – recomposition and critical edition, is a unique edition of 591 so-called prayers on psalms or psalm-prayers rendered from Latin orationes super psalmos or orationes psalmicae respectively. They could be defined as short prayers said optionally at the end of a psalm recitation in some Christian liturgies. LOP was published by Jorge Pinell in 1972 (Barcelona-Madrid) as the 9th volume of Monumenta Hispaniae Sacra. The subject, the editor and the date of its publication were closely related to the Second Vatican Council (1962–1965) and the reform of the Latin liturgy begun then within the Roman Catholic Church. The text of LOP can be considered to be the main content of a still missing fifth volume of the Liturgy of the Hours. It was renewed in 1971 according to that Council's principles laid in the Constitution on the Sacred Liturgy Sacrosanctum Concilium. The volume was mentioned in the same year in the General Instruction of the Liturgy of the Hours (para 112), but for some reason has not been published.

== Psalm-prayers ==
=== Recitation difficulties ===
The Biblical Psalms are the core of the Divine Office or the Liturgy of the Hours, a Christian prayer practice. Throughout its history, beginning in the pre-Christian era in the context of Jewish religion, believers have been reciting or singing these 150 poems. Scholars point out two main types of this practice in antiquity: so-called cursus cathedralis (a cathedral way of psalms recitation) and cursus monasticus (a monastic way of psalms recitation), which are relevant to the discussion on the modern Divine Office. The cursus cathedralis was characteristic of urban churches where secular clergy, especially bishops, presided over the liturgy, hence an adjective cathedral in the name. It arranged the order of psalms according to the daily solar cycle, which means that specific psalms were sung at sunrise, others at sunset and some during other parts of the day. Their texts corresponded somehow to the day part. The lyrical subjects praise God in a particular time setting, usually mentioned literally. In cursus monasticus, the whole Psalter was recited continuously through the day and night, regardless of content. Such a practice was typical of monasticism.

Both ways of reciting the psalms caused some difficulties. The meaning of these Biblical poems was not always clear. Most Christians received the Psalter through the Septuagint, a Greek translation by Alexandrian Jews from the 3rd century BC, rather than in its original Hebrew version. Even after translation its grammar structure and style of syntax remained essentially Hebrew. This rendered Septuagint partly incomprehensible without serious philological studies. Despite these apparent problems the Greek translation of the Psalter not only became widespread, but was many times translated into everyday Latin, which made the meaning of the text unclear. However, the influence of these translations was so huge that believers in the West did not accept Jerome's Latin Psalter rendering of the Hebrew version. The power of usus among the ancient Christians was much stronger than the need of clear understanding.

=== Helping tools ===
To resolve problems of understanding and to avoid sleepiness, boredom and lack of concentration arising during long recitations, Christians added many elements to the Divine Office. A few remained relevant in Latin Christianity.

Almost always the psalms are surrounded in contemporary editions of liturgical books by so-called antiphons, short sung sentences preceding and following a particular psalm or an entire psalmody (set of psalms). Antiphons have many sources. Often it is just a verse taken from a psalm as a kind of key-verse to interpret the whole poem. Usually in solemnities, feasts and special seasons of the liturgical year, like the Advent, Lent or Eastertide, antiphons render passages from the remaining books of the Bible or Patristic writings, casting light on psalms in the context of the particular liturgical time.

Moreover, each psalm has a set of texts, almost always printed alongside the poem. Right after the number of a psalm, editors print the heading (Latin titulus) which is a brief summary of the psalm. A quotation from the New Testament or Patristic writings follows, providing a Christian interpretation. Each psalm ends with a doxology, which is a short praise of the Holy Trinity, putting the psalm in context. Then editors recommend to keep a "sacred silence": a time for a private silent meditation on the text. Psalm-prayers can follow.

Contrary to the helping tools these prayers were not testified in the Roman Rite until the reform of the Liturgy of the Hours after the Second Vatican Council. TheGeneral Instruction of the Liturgy of the Hours does not give their particular definition, but enumerates them alongside the antiphons and the headings in Chapter 3 The Various parts of the Liturgy of the Hours, Section 2 The Antiphons and Other Parts which Help in Praying the Psalms (paras 110–120). Moreover, there is no consistency in the terminology. A term oratio psalmica – psalm-prayer – appears together with a more meaningful term oratio super psalmum, which could be translated literally as a prayer on a psalm. A particular aim of such a prayer is stated: the psalm-prayer sums up the aspirations and emotions of those saying them (oratio psallentium affectus colligat et concludat – para 112). These prayers should be provided by a Supplement to the book of the Liturgy of the Hours as the Instruction claims. Such a supplement has never appeared.

== Liber Orationum Psalmographus ==
=== Pinell's work on the reform of the liturgy ===
Although it is difficult to explain the Supplement absence, it is possible to find how its announcement was included in the Instruction. According to the reports of the several post-conciliar commissions working on liturgy reform, Jorge Pinell OSB (1921–1997) gave a particular impulse to introduce psalm-prayers to the renewed Liturgy of the Hours. He was a Spanish monk of the Abbey Santa Maria de Montserrat belonging to the Benedictine Subiaco Congregation. Pinell studied at Catholic University of Leuven, Pontifical Gregorian University and Pontificio Ateneo Sant Anselmo in Rome and became a professor of liturgical studies at the latter. Staying there he actively took part in works on liturgy reform after the Second Vatican Council as a scholar and a member, so-called consultor, of the Consilium ad Exsequendam Constitutionem de Sacra Liturgia – Commission for implementing the Constitution on the Sacred Liturgy Sacrosanctum Concilium promulgated in 1963.

Members of the commission knew about Pinell's work on the critical edition of psalm-prayers and were waiting for the final draft. Although Pinell considered only the psalm-prayers of the Mozarabic or Old Spanish Rite, there was a reason to use them in the reform of the Roman Rite. The aim of the reform was to reshape highly monasticised heavy Roman Rite to its original light cathedral form. The lack of sources from such a primitive stage of the Roman Rite development made this task impossible, at least directly. Commission members decided to include cathedral elements of other Latin rites. Such cathedral elements taken from the Spanish Rite were psalm-prayers.

Psalm-prayers' role in the renewed Liturgy of the Hours would be to ease recitations. Others did not want to include psalm-prayers to the main text of the Liturgy because another aim of the reform was simplicity. Hence they chose to present the psalm-prayers in a separate book: the Supplement.

=== Pinell's work outside the reform of the liturgy ===
Eventually in 1971 the renewed Liturgy of the Hours was published without a supplement. Pinell published his work a year later in 1972. Contrary to the previous editions of the psalm-prayers presenting three series of such prayers depended on their assumed origin (African, Roman, Spanish). LOP, though limited to one Spanish series, includes a 300-page general introduction to the psalm-prayers and the critical apparatus attached to each. The apparatus provides references to all sources testifying to a prayer. The range of sources is much wider than in aforementioned works, whose editors used only psalters containing the prayers following each psalm. The sources of LOP include the Mozarabic psalter preserved in an 11th-century manuscript from the Spanish Abbey of Santo Domingo de Silos, Liber Misticus or Mixtus (10th–11th century), Liber Orationum Festivus (8th–9th century), Liber Ordinum (11th century), Liber Horarum (11th century). Pinell considered early modern printed books from such as Breviarium secundum regulam beati Isidori (Toledo 1502) or Breviarium Gothicum (Madrid 1775). LOP's diversity of sources explain the presence of the word 're-composition' in its subtitle. Paradoxically, this feature could be a motive for the editors' decision to leave this book outside the Liturgy of the Hours. Pinell does not always put together all these prayers in a convincing way and sometimes makes arbitrary decisions about his collection's structure, composing rather than re-composing, so his work is somewhat artificial. Nevertheless, that diversity of sources remains its strongest point.
