= Iglesia de las Santas Justa y Rufina, Toledo =

Church in Toledo, Spain

Coordinates: 39.8589°N 4.0233°W

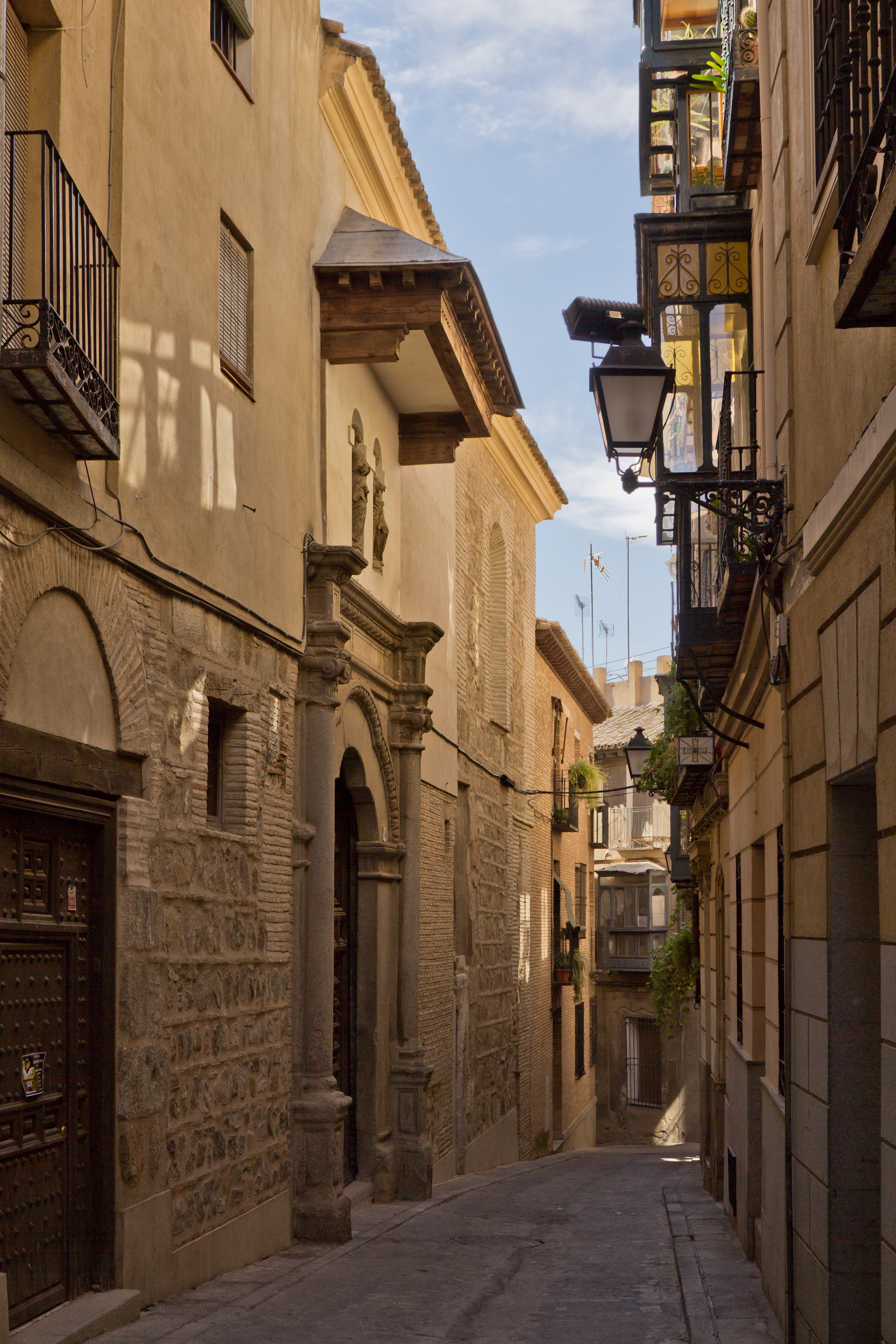
Facade of the church, located in a narrow street of Toledo.

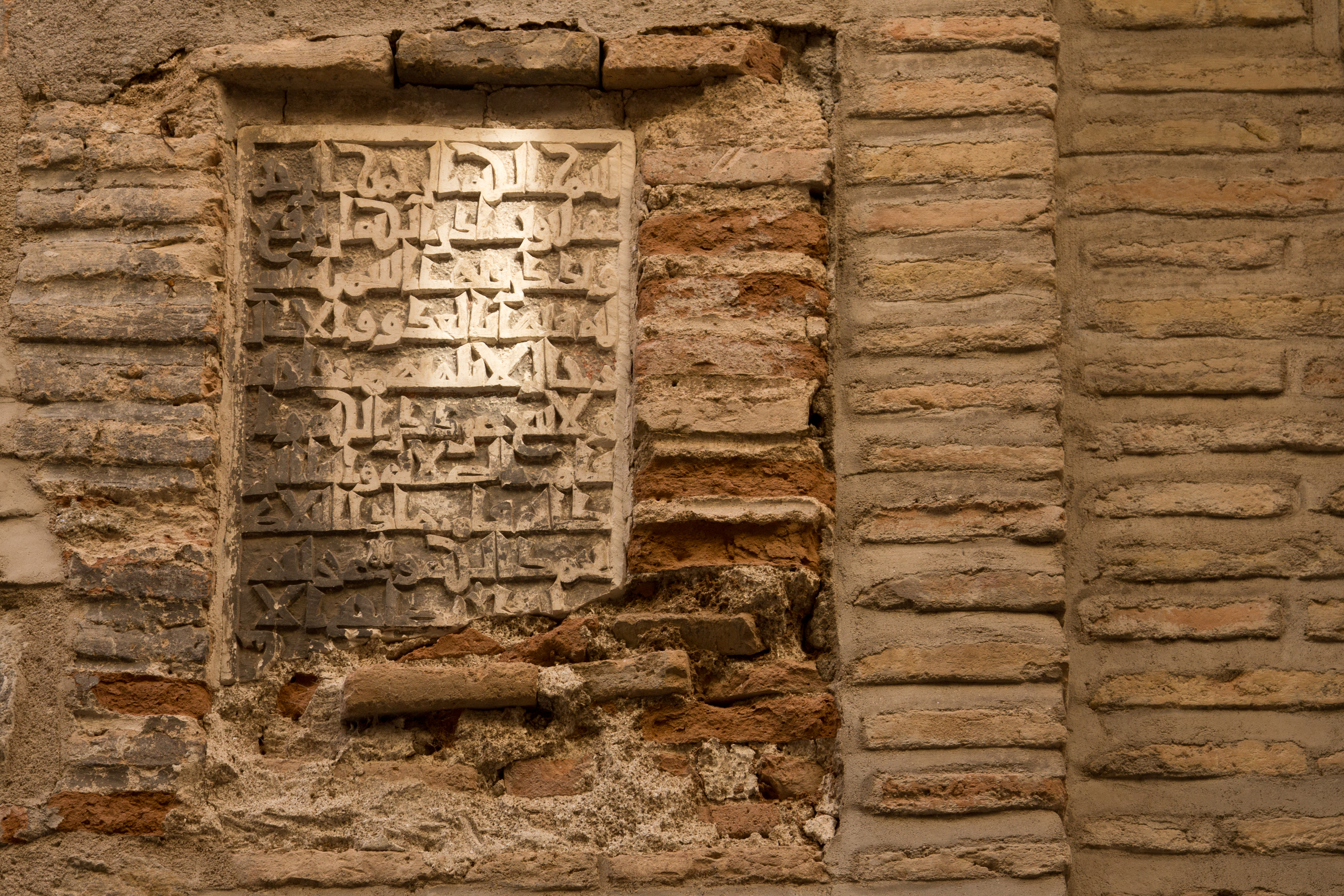
An Arabic inscription on the facade of the church.

The Iglesia de las Santas Justa y Rufina is a medieval church in Toledo, Castile-La Mancha, Spain. It is one of a group of so-called Mozarabic parish churches in Toledo, whose existence has been documented since 1156. However, certain material remains reveal the existence in this place of an Islamic construction, which would undoubtedly have to be identified with a mosque. Until very recently, the only testimony of the existence of an Islamic construction consisted of a fragment of arch that, on a Visigothic pilaster, was embedded in the northwest facade of the temple. The reuse of a piece from previous period, combined with the characteristics of the cutting of the arch, allow them to think of an Islamic work dating around 10th century.

Once the temple was consecrated to Christian worship, its apse had to be erected, whose formal characteristics would lead it to relate it to that of the Mosque of Cristo de la Luz and, therefore, to date it with a similar chronology: 12th century or early 13th century. In this way, it would be inserted in the first phase of the Toledan Mudéjar.

The main transformations of the building arrived from 1530, by the hand of Alonso de Covarrubias.
