= Liturgy of the Hours =

Prayers comprising the liturgical hours

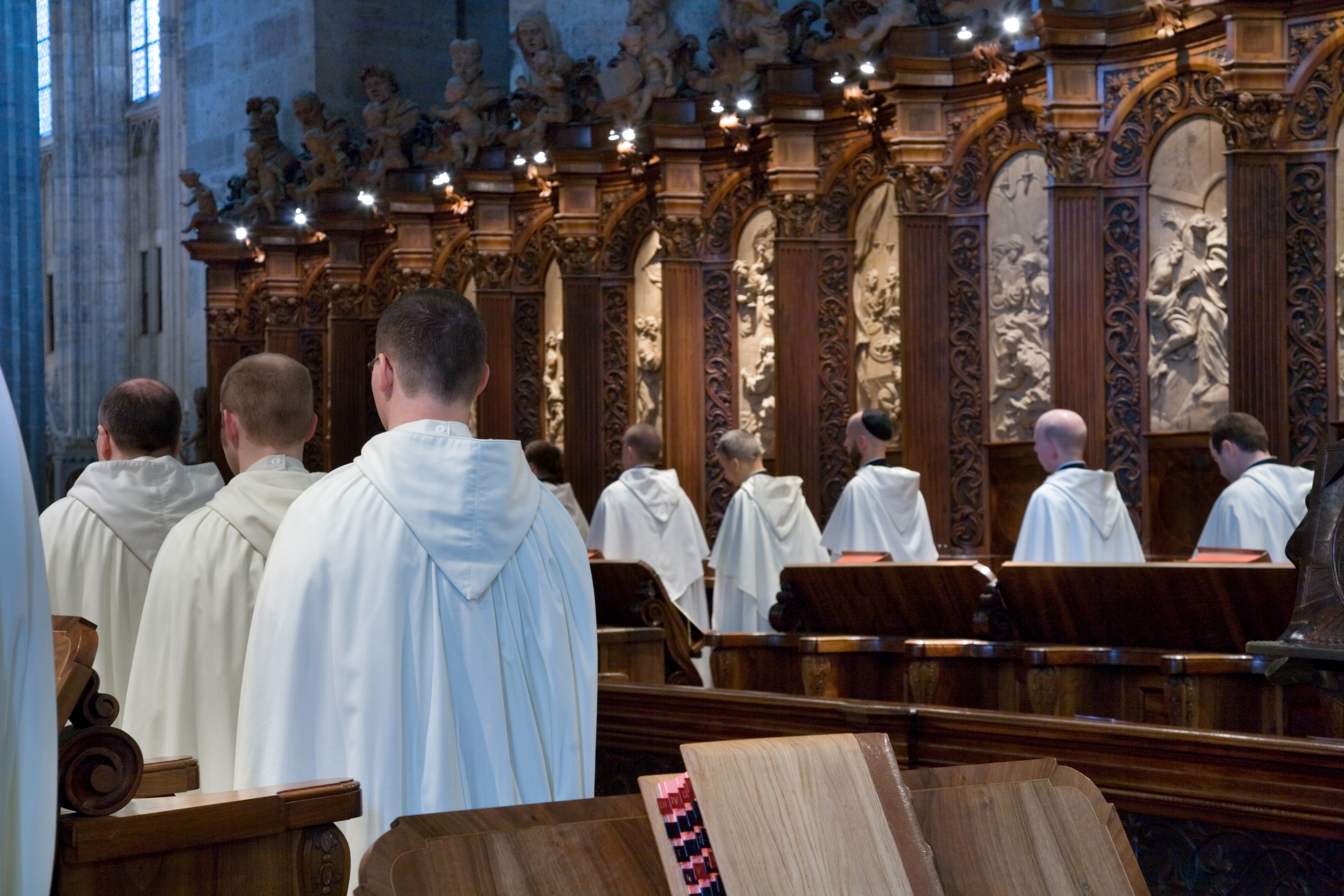
Cistercian monks praying the Liturgy of the Hours in Heiligenkreuz Abbey

The Liturgy of the Hours (Latin: Liturgia Horarum), Divine Office (Latin: Divinum Officium), or Opus Dei ("Work of God") is a set of Catholic prayers comprising the canonical hours, (Note: The term "canonical hours" can mean either the times of day at which the different parts of the Liturgy of the Hours are to be recited or the prayers said at those times. Other names in Latin liturgical rites for the Liturgy of the Hours include "Diurnal and Nocturnal Office", "Ecclesiastical Office", Cursus ecclesiasticus, or simply cursus.) often also referred to as the breviary, (Note: A "breviary" can also refer to the book of prayers to be said rather than the liturgy and prayers themselves.) of the Latin Church. The Liturgy of the Hours forms the official set of prayers "marking the hours of each day and sanctifying the day with prayer", and "extend[ing] to the other hours of the day the praise and thanksgiving of the Eucharistic celebration". The term "Liturgy of the Hours" has been retroactively applied to the practices of saying the canonical hours in both the Christian East and West–particularly within the Latin liturgical rites–prior to the Second Vatican Council, and is the official term for the canonical hours promulgated for usage by the Latin Church in 1971. Before 1971, the official form for the Latin Church was the Breviarium Romanum, first published in 1568 with major editions through 1962.

The Liturgy of the Hours, like many other forms of the canonical hours, consists primarily of psalms supplemented by hymns, readings, and other prayers and antiphons prayed at fixed prayer times. Together with the Mass, it constitutes the public prayer of the church. Christians of both Western and Eastern traditions (including the Latin Catholic, Eastern Catholic, Eastern Orthodox, Oriental Orthodox, Assyrian, Lutheran, Anglican, and some other Protestant churches) celebrate the canonical hours in various forms and under various names. The chant or recitation of the Divine Office therefore forms the basis of prayer within the consecrated life, with some of the monastic or mendicant orders producing their own permutations of the Liturgy of the Hours and older Roman Breviary.

Praying the Divine Office is an obligation undertaken by priests and deacons intending to become priests, while deacons intending to remain deacons are obliged to recite only a part. The constitutions of religious institutes generally oblige their members to celebrate at least parts and in some cases to do so jointly ("in choir"). Consecrated virgins take the duty to celebrate the liturgy of hours with the rite of consecration. Within the Latin Church, the faithful "are encouraged to recite the divine office, either with the priests, or among themselves, or even individually", though there is no obligation for them to do so. The laity may oblige themselves to pray the Liturgy of the Hours or part of it by a personal vow.

The present official form of the entire Liturgy of the Hours of the Roman Rite is that contained in the four-volume Latin-language publication Liturgia Horarum, the first edition of which appeared in 1971. English and other vernacular translations were soon produced and were made official for their territories by the competent episcopal conferences. For Catholics in primarily Commonwealth nations, the three-volume Divine Office, which uses a range of different English Bibles for the readings from Scripture, was published in 1974. The four-volume Liturgy of the Hours, with Scripture readings from the New American Bible, appeared in 1975 with approval from the United States Conference of Catholic Bishops. The 1989 English translation of the Ceremonial of Bishops includes in Part III instructions on the Liturgy of the Hours which the bishop presides, for example the vesper on major solemnities.

== Origins ==
The General Instruction of the Liturgy of Hours in the Roman Rite states: "The public and communal prayer of the people of God is rightly considered among the first duties of the Church. From the very beginning the baptized 'remained faithful to the teaching of the apostles, to the brotherhood, to the breaking of bread and to the prayers' (Acts 2 :42). Many times the Acts of the Apostles testifies that the Christian community prayed together. The testimony of the early Church shows that individual faithful also devoted themselves to prayer at certain hours. In various areas the practice soon gained ground of devoting special times to prayer in common."

Early Christians were in fact continuing the Jewish practice of reciting prayers at certain hours of the day or night. In the Psalms are found expressions like "in the morning I offer you my prayer"; "At midnight I will rise and thank you"; "Evening, morning and at noon I will cry and lament"; "Seven times a day I praise you". The Apostles observed the Jewish custom of praying at the third, sixth, and ninth hours, and at midnight (Acts 10:3, 9; 16:25; etc.). Hence the practice of seven fixed prayer times has been taught from the time of the early Church; in Apostolic Tradition, Hippolytus instructed Christians to pray seven times a day "on rising, at the lighting of the evening lamp, at bedtime, at midnight" and "the third, sixth and ninth hours of the day, being hours associated with Christ's Passion".

The Christian prayer of that time consisted of almost the same elements as the Jewish: recital or chanting of psalms and reading of the Old Testament, to which were soon added readings of the Gospels, Acts, and epistles, and canticles. Other elements were added later in the course of the centuries.

== Historical development ==
=== Early church ===
In Roman cities, the bell in the forum rang the beginning of the business day at about six o'clock in the morning (Prime, the "first hour"), noted the day's progress by striking again at about nine o'clock in the morning (Terce, the "third hour"), tolled for the lunch break at noon (Sext, the "sixth hour"), called the people back to work again at about three o'clock in the afternoon (None, the "ninth hour"), and rang the close of the business day at about six o'clock in the evening (the time for evening prayer).

The healing of the crippled man at the temple gate occurred as Peter and John were going to the temple to pray (Acts 3:1) at the "ninth hour" of prayer (about three o’clock in the afternoon). The decision to include Gentiles among the community of believers, arose from a vision Peter had while praying at noontime, (Acts 10:9–49) the "sixth hour".

The early church was known to pray the Psalms (Acts 4:23–30), which have remained a part of the canonical hours. By 60 AD, the Didache recommended disciples to pray the Lord's Prayer three times a day; this practice found its way into the canonical hours as well. Pliny the Younger (63 – c. 113), mentions not only fixed times of prayer by believers, but also specific services – other than the Eucharist – assigned to those times: "they met on a stated day before it was light, and addressed a form of prayer to Christ, as to a divinity, … after which it was their custom to separate, and then reassemble, to eat in common a harmless meal."

By the second and third centuries, such Church Fathers as Clement of Alexandria, Origen, and Tertullian wrote of the practice of Morning and Evening Prayer, and of the prayers at terce, sext, and none. Daily morning and evening prayer preceded daily Mass, for the Mass was first limited to Sundays and then gradually spread to some feast days. The daily prayer kept alive the theme of gratitude from the Sunday "Eucharist" (which means gratitude). The prayers could be prayed individually or in groups. By the third century, the Desert Fathers began to live out Paul's command to "pray without ceasing" (1 Thessalonians 5:17) by having one group of monks pray one fixed-hour prayer while having another group pray the next prayer.

=== Middle Ages ===
As the format of unbroken fixed-hour prayer developed in the Christian monastic communities in the East and West, longer prayers soon grew, but the cycle of prayer became the norm in daily life in monasteries. By the fourth century, the characteristics of the canonical hours more or less took their present shape. For secular (non-monastic) clergymen and lay people, the fixed-hour prayers were by necessity much shorter. In many churches and basilicas staffed by monks, the form of the fixed-hour prayers was a hybrid of secular and monastic practice.

In the East, the development of the Divine Services shifted from the area around Jerusalem to Constantinople. In particular, Theodore the Studite (c. 758 – c. 826) combined a number of influences from the Byzantine court ritual with monastic practices common in Asia Minor, and added thereto a number of hymns composed by himself and his brother Joseph (see Typicon for further details).

In the West, the Rule of Saint Benedict modeled his guidelines for the prayers on the customs of the basilicas of Rome. It was he who expounded the concept in Christian prayer of the inseparability of the spiritual life from the physical life. The Benedictines began to call the prayers the Opus Dei or "Work of God."

As the Divine Office grew more important in the life of the church, the rituals became more elaborate. Soon, praying the Office began to require various books, such as a psalter for the psalms, a lectionary to find the assigned scripture reading for the day, a Bible to proclaim the reading, a hymnal for singing, etc. As parishes grew in the Middle Ages away from cathedrals and basilicas, a more concise way of arranging the hours was needed. So, a sort of list developed called the Breviary, which gave the format of the daily office and the texts to be used.

The spread of breviaries eventually reached Rome, where Pope Innocent III extended its use to the Roman Curia. The Franciscans sought a one-volume breviary for its friars to use during travels, so the order adopted the Breviarium Curiae, but substituting the Gallican Psalter for the Roman. The Franciscans gradually spread this breviary throughout Europe. Pope Nicholas III would then adopt the widely used Franciscan breviary to be the breviary used in Rome. By the 14th century, the breviary contained the entire text of the canonical hours.

=== Revision by Pope Pius V ===
The Council of Trent, at its final session on 4 December 1563, entrusted the reform of the breviary to the then pope, Pius IV. On 9 July 1568, Pope Pius V, the successor to Pius IV who closed the Council of Trent, promulgated an edition, known as the Roman Breviary, with his Apostolic Constitution Quod a nobis, imposing it in the same way in which, two years later, he imposed his Roman Missal and using language very similar to that in the bull Quo primum with which he promulgated the Missal.

With the same bull, Pius V ordered the general abolition of all breviaries other than his reformed breviary, with the same exception that he was to make in his Quo primum bull: he allowed those legitimately in use for at least 200 years to continue. Examples of such breviaries are the Benedictine (Breviarium Monasticum), the Carmelite, the Carthusian, the Dominican, the Premonstratensian, and the Ambrosian.

St. Mark's Basilica in Venice, along with the four churches under its jurisdiction, retained its own unique liturgies, psalms, and Latin translations into the 19th century. Many other churches whose local rites predated Pius V's breviary by 200 years or more, such as that of Mantua, continued to use their own breviaries, liturgical calendars, and psalms, as well.

=== Further revision between the 16th to 20th centuries ===
Later popes altered the Roman Breviary of Pope Pius V. Pope Clement VIII instituted obligatory changes on 10 May 1602, 34 years after Pius V's revision. Pope Urban VIII made further changes, including "a profound alteration in the character of some of the hymns. Although some of them without doubt gained in literary style, nevertheless, to the regret of many, they also lost something of their old charm of simplicity and fervour."

Pope Pius X made a radical revision of the Roman Breviary, to be put into effect, at latest, on 1 January 1913. See Reform of the Roman Breviary by Pope Pius X.

Pope Pius XII allowed the use of a new translation of the Psalms from the Hebrew and established a special commission to study a general revision, concerning which all the Catholic bishops were consulted in 1955. His successor, Pope John XXIII, implemented these revisions in 1960.

=== Revision following the Second Vatican Council ===
Following the Second Vatican Council, the Catholic Church's Latin Church, hoping to restore their character as the prayer of the entire church, revised the liturgical book for the celebration of the Divine Office, and published it under the title "Liturgy of the Hours".

The Council itself abolished the office of Prime, and envisioned a manner of distributing the psalms over a period of more than one week. In the succeeding revision, the character of Matins was changed to an Office of Readings so that it could be used at any time of the day as an office of Scriptural and patristic readings. Furthermore, the period over which the Psalter is recited has been expanded from one week to four. The Latin hymns of the Roman Office were in many cases restored to the pre-Urban form, albeit several of them were shortened.

== Latin typical editions ==
This Liturgy of the Hours (Liturgia Horarum in Latin) is published by Libreria Editrice Vaticana in four volumes, arranged according to the liturgical seasons of the church year.

- Volume I: Advent Season, Christmas Season
- Volume II: Lenten Season, Easter Season
- Volume III: Ordinary Time, Weeks 1 to 17
- Volume IV: Ordinary Time, Weeks 18 to 34

The liturgical books for the celebration of the Liturgy of the Hours in Latin are those of the editio typica altera (second typical edition) promulgated in 1985 and re-issued by the Vatican Publishing House – Libreria Editrice Vaticana – in 2000 and 2003.

Midwest Theological Forum has published an edition iuxta typicam with updating of the celebration of saints. It is arranged in six volumes:

- Volume I: Adventus–Nativitatis
- Volume II: Tempus Quadragesimæ
- Volume III: Tempus paschale
- Volume IV: Tempus per annum I–XIV
- Volume V: Tempus per annum XII–XXIV
- Volume VI: Tempus per annum XXI–XXXIV

Although most priests and other clerics in the Latin Church now use the Roman breviary, some (such as those in the Priestly Fraternity of Saint Peter or similar societies) continue to use the breviary as revised by Pope Pius X, the latest edition of which was issued under Pope John XXIII. The motu proprio Summorum Pontificum in 2007 authorized every Latin Church cleric to use this edition to fulfill his canonical obligation to pray the Divine Office. An English/Latin parallel edition was published by Baronius Press in April 2012.

== Official English translations ==
Three English translations are in use:

=== The Divine Office (non-ICEL translation) ===
The Divine Office was produced by a commission set up by the Episcopal Conferences of Australia, England and Wales, Ireland and Scotland. First published in 1974 by HarperCollins, this edition is the official English edition for use in the dioceses of the above countries as well as many other dioceses around the world, especially in Asian and African countries. It is arranged in three volumes:

- Volume I: Advent, Christmastide & Weeks 1–9 of the Year
- Volume II: Lent and Eastertide
- Volume III: Weeks of the Church Year 6–34.

The psalms are taken (with slight adaptations) from the 1963 Grail Psalms, while the Scripture readings and non-Gospel canticles are taken from various versions of the Bible, including the Revised Standard Version, the Jerusalem Bible, the Good News Bible, the New English Bible and Ronald Knox's Translation of the Vulgate. Some of the canticles taken from the Revised Standard Version were amended slightly to conform the English text to the Vulgate in The Divine Office. The intercessions, concluding prayers, antiphons, short responses, responsories, second readings in the Office of Readings, the Te Deum and the Glory be to the Father are all translations approved by the episcopal conferences mentioned and confirmed by the Holy See in December 1973. The Gospel canticles (Benedictus, Magnificat, Nunc Dimittis) are from the 1963 Grail Translation, but an appendix at the end of the book gives the English Language Liturgical Consultation (ELLC)) versions of the Gospel canticles as alternatives.

Collins also publishes shorter editions of The Divine Office:

- Daily Prayer – comprising the complete Divine Office, except for the Office of Readings (but the full Office of Readings are printed for Christmas, Good Friday and Holy Saturday)
- Morning & Evening Prayer – comprising the complete Morning, Evening and Night prayers from the Divine Office
- Shorter Morning & Evening Prayer – comprising the Psalter for Morning, Evening and Night prayers and a selection of texts from the liturgical seasons and feasts.

Between 2005 and 2006, Collins republished The Divine Office and its various shorter editions with a new cover and revised Calendar of the Movable Feasts.

Besides these shorter editions of The Divine Office, there used to be A Shorter Prayer During the Day comprising the Psalter for the Middle Hours also published by Collins. The last known reprint year is 1986, but this edition is now out of print. In 2009, Prayer during the day was published by Catholic Truth Society.

=== Liturgy of the Hours (ICEL translation) ===
The Liturgy of the Hours, produced by the International Commission on English in the Liturgy, was first published in 1975 by Catholic Book Publishing Company in the USA. This edition is the official English edition for use in the US, Canada and some other English-speaking dioceses. It is in four volumes, an arrangement identical to the original Latin typical edition.

The psalms are taken (slightly adapted) from the 1963 Grail Psalms, while the Scripture readings and non-Gospel canticles are taken from the original 1970 first edition New American Bible. The prayers and intercessions are translated by the International Commission on English in the Liturgy (ICEL). The ELLC versions are used for items such as the Gospel canticles. An additional feature are psalm-prayers at the end of many Psalms, which were ICEL's translation of the Liber Orationum Psalmographus, the Book of Psalm-Prayers which originated in the Mozarabic Rite.

Shorter editions of the Liturgy of the Hours are also available from various publishers: Christian Prayer (Daughters of St Paul and Catholic Book Publishing Company), Shorter Christian Prayer (Catholic Book Publishing Company) and Daytime Prayer (Catholic Book Publishing Company). In 2007, Liturgy Training Publications released the Mundelein Psalter, containing Morning, Evening and Night Prayers and the Office for the Dead, with the 1963 Grail translation of the Psalms set to specially composed chant, and with hymns translated from the hymns of the Latin Liturgia Horarum.

The Divine Office and the Liturgy of the Hours editions are both based on the Latin 1971 editio typica.

=== Liturgy of the Hours (ICEL/African translation) ===
In 2009, on the occasion of the Synod of African Bishops in Rome, the Catholic Church in Africa, through Paulines Publications Africa, published a new English edition of the Liturgy of the Hours based on the Liturgia Horarum, editio typica altera. The antiphons and orations in this edition are taken from ICEL's 1975 translation of the Liturgy of the Hours, with independent translations for the offices for the new saints added to the General Roman Calendar as well as the Benedictus and Magnificat antiphons for the 3-year cycle on Sundays added in the Liturgia Horarum, editio typica altera.

The Psalms are taken from the Revised Grail Psalter with the rest of the biblical texts taken from the New American Bible. This is the only official English edition of the Office that is based on the Liturgia Horarum, editio typica altera.

== Previous structure ==
By the time of Benedict of Nursia (480–548 AD), the monastic Divine Office was composed of seven daytime hours and one at night. In his Rule of St. Benedict, he associated the practice with Psalm 118/119:164, "Seven times a day I praise you", and Psalm 118/119:62, "At midnight I rise to praise you". Of these eight hours, Prime and Compline may be the latest to appear, because the 4th-century Apostolic Constitutions VIII iv 34 do not mention them in the exhortation "Offer up your prayers in the morning, at the third hour, the sixth, the ninth, the evening, and at cock-crowing". The eight are known by the following names, which do not reflect the times of day at which in the second millennium they have traditionally been recited, as shown by the use of the word "noon", derived from Latin (hora) nona, to mean midday, not 3 in the afternoon:

- Matins (pre-dawn early hours, about 2 a.m.), sometimes called Vigil (around midnight), and composed of two or three nocturns
- Lauds (at dawn, about 4 a.m.)
- Prime (first hour = approximately 6 a.m.)
- Terce (third hour = approximately 9 a.m.)
- Sext (sixth hour = approximately 12 noon)
- None (ninth hour = approximately 3 p.m.)
- Vespers (at the lighting of the lamps, about 6 p.m.)
- Compline (before retiring, about 8 p.m.)

This arrangement of the Divine Office is described by Benedict. However, it is found in John Cassian's Twelve books on the institutes of the coenobia and the remedies for the eight principal faults, which describe the monastic practices of the Desert Fathers of Egypt.

== Current structure in the Roman Rite ==
After the Second Vatican Council (1962 to 1965), which decided that the hour of prime should be suppressed, Pope Paul VI decreed a new arrangement of the Liturgy of the Hours. The structure of the offices, the distribution of psalms, and the prayers were updated. The distinction, already expressed in the 1960 Code of Rubrics, between the three major hours (Matins, Lauds and Vespers) and the minor hours (Terce, Sext, None and Compline) has been retained.

- The Office of Readings, (lat. Officium lectionis) or Matins or Vigils) – major hour
- Lauds – major hour
- Terce (for the invocation of the Holy Spirit, in monasteries often directly before the Convent's mass) – minor hour
- Sext (midday) – minor hour
- None (afternoon) – minor hour
- Vespers – major hour
- Compline (night prayer) – minor hour

All hours, including the minor hours, start with the versicle from Ps 70 (69) v. 2 (as do all offices in the traditional breviary except Matins and Compline): V. Deus, in adiutorium meum intende; R. Domine, ad adiuvandum me festina ("O God, come to my aid: O Lord, make haste to help me"), followed by the doxology. The verse is omitted if the hour begins with the Invitatory (Morning Prayer/Lauds or the Office of Reading). The Invitatory is the introduction to the first hour said on the current day, whether it be the Office of Readings or Morning Prayer.

The opening is followed by a hymn. The hymn is followed by psalmody. The psalmody is followed by a scripture reading. The reading is called a chapter (capitulum) if it is short, or a lesson (lectio) if it is long.

The reading is followed by a versicle. The hour is closed by an oration followed by a concluding versicle. Other components are included depending on the exact type of hour being celebrated. In each office, the psalms and canticle are framed by antiphons, and each concludes with the doxology.

=== Major hours ===
The major hours are the Office of Readings, Lauds and Vespers. The Office of Readings consists of:

- opening versicle or invitatory
- a hymn
- three psalms or portions of psalms
- a long passage from scripture, usually arranged consecutively from the same book of the Bible for one or more weeks
- a long patristic or magisterial passage or, on the feast of a saint, a hagiographical passage concerning the saint
- on nights preceding Sundays and feast days, the office may be expanded to a vigil by inserting three Old Testament canticles and a reading from the gospels
- the hymn Te Deum (on Sundays outside of Lent, during the octaves of Easter and Christmas, on solemnities and feasts)
- the concluding prayer
- a short concluding verse (especially when prayed in groups)

The character of Lauds is that of praise and dignifying the morning; of Vespers that of thanksgiving. Both follow a similar format:

- opening versicle "O God, come to our aid: O Lord, make haste to help us" (this versicle is not used when the invitatory with the versicle "Lord, open my lips. And my mouth will proclaim your praise" immediately precedes Lauds)
- a hymn
- two psalms, or parts of psalms with a scriptural canticle. At Lauds, this consists of a psalm of praise, a canticle from the Old Testament, followed by another psalm. At Vespers this consists of two psalms, or one psalm divided into two parts, and a scriptural canticle taken from the New Testament.
- a short passage from scripture
- a responsory, typically a verse of scripture, but sometimes liturgical poetry
- a canticle taken from the Gospel of Luke: the Canticle of Zechariah (Benedictus) for Lauds, and the Canticle of Mary (Magnificat) for Vespers
- intercessions
- the Lord's Prayer
- the concluding prayer
- if a priest or a deacon is present, he dismisses the people with the greeting "The Lord be with you" and a blessing; Otherwise the celebration is concluded with "The Lord bless us", etc.

=== Minor hours ===
The daytime hours follow a simpler format, like a very compact form of the Office of Readings:

- opening versicle
- a hymn
- three short psalms, or, three pieces of longer psalms; if only one of the minor hours is said, it follows a variable psalmody which usually opens with part of the longest psalm, psalm 118/119; when all three are said this psalmody is used at one of the hours, while the other two follow the complementary psalmody which consists of 119/120–121/122 at Terce, 122/123–124/125 at Sext and 125/126–127/128 at None
- a short passage of scripture, followed by a responsorial verse
- the concluding prayer

Compline has the character of preparing the soul for its passage to eternal life:

- opening versicle
- an examination of conscience
- a hymn
- a psalm, or two short psalms; The psalms of Sunday – Psalm 90/91 or 4 and 133/134 – may always be used as an alternative to the psalm(s) appointed on weekdays
- a short reading from scripture
- the responsory In manus tuas, Domine (Into Your Hands, Lord)
- the Canticle of Simeon, Nunc dimittis, from the Gospel of Luke, framed by the antiphon Salva nos (Save us Lord)
- a concluding prayer
- a short blessing (Noctem quietam et finem perfectum concedat nobis Dominus omnipotens. Amen.)
- a Marian antiphon used for the appropriate liturgical season. In addition to the antiphons given in The Divine Office, others may be approved by the Episcopal Conference.

=== Liturgical variation ===
In addition to the distribution of almost the whole Psalter over a four-week cycle, the church also provides appropriate hymns, readings, psalms, canticles and antiphons, for use in marking specific celebrations in the Roman Calendar, which sets out the order for the liturgical year. These selections are found in the 'Proper of Seasons' (for Advent, Christmas, Lent and Easter), and the 'Proper of Saints' (for feast days of the Saints).

== Usage ==
The invitatory precedes the canonical hours of the day beginning with the versicle "Lord, open my lips. And my mouth will proclaim your praise" (Ps 50/51 v.17), and continuing with an antiphon and the Invitatory Psalm, usually Psalm 94/95.

All psalms and canticles are accompanied by antiphons.

Unless the invitatory is used, each hour begins with the versicle "O God, come to our aid: O Lord, make haste to help us" (Ps 69/70 v.2) The "Glory be to the Father" follows.

Matins or the Office of Readings is the longest hour. Before the reform of the Roman Breviary by Pope Pius X, Matins involved the recitation of 18 psalms on Sundays and 12 on ferial days. Pope Pius X reduced this to nine psalms or portions of psalms, still arranged in three nocturns, each set of three psalms followed by three readings, usually three consecutive sections from the same text. Pope Paul VI's reform reduced the number of psalms or portions of psalms to three, and the readings to two, but lengthened these. On Sundays outside of Lent, during the octaves of Easter and Christmas, on solemnities and feasts, the Te Deum is sung after the second reading with its responsory.

After Pius X's reform, Lauds was reduced to four psalms or portions of psalms and an Old Testament canticle, putting an end to the custom of adding the last three psalms of the Psalter (148–150) at the end of Lauds every day. The number of psalms or portions of psalms is now reduced to two, together with one Old Testament canticle chosen from a wider range than before. After these there is a short reading and response and the singing or recitation of the Benedictus.

Vespers has a very similar structure, differing in that Pius X assigned to it five psalms (now reduced to two psalms and a New Testament canticle) and the Magnificat took the place of the Benedictus. On some days in Pius X's arrangement, but now always, there follow Preces or intercessions. In the present arrangement, the Lord's Prayer is also recited before the concluding prayer.

Terce, Sext and None have an identical structure, each with three psalms or portions of psalms. These are followed by a short reading from Scripture, once referred to as a "little chapter" (capitulum), and by a versicle and response. The Lesser Litany (Kyrie and the Lord's Prayer) of Pius X's arrangement have now been omitted.

Prime and Compline also were of similar structure, though different from Terce, Sext and None.

=== Former Anglican form ===
Following the establishment of the personal ordinariates for former Anglicans in the 2009 apostolic constitution Anglicanorum coetibus, there was sought an Anglican Use form of the Office that reflects Anglican tradition. In the Personal Ordinariate of Our Lady of Walsingham in England and Wales, the Customary of Our Lady of Walsingham was adopted.

In 2020, the Divine Worship: Daily Office was announced as the new Divine Office of the Anglican Use personal ordinariates. There are two editions: the North American Edition released in late 2020 for use by the Personal Ordinariate of the Chair of Saint Peter and the Commonwealth Edition to be released in 2021 to replace the Customary in the Personal Ordinariate of Our Lady of Walsingham and introduce an office for the Personal Ordinariate of Our Lady of the Southern Cross in Australia, Japan, and Oceania. While developed primarily from the Anglican tradition, the Divine Worship: Daily Office is considered to be a specific use of the Liturgy of the Hours.

== Books used ==
In monasteries and cathedrals, celebration of the Liturgy of the Hours became more elaborate. Served by monks or canons, regular celebration required a Psalter for the psalms, a lectionary for the Scripture readings, other books for patristic and hagiographical readings, a collectary for the orations, and also books such as the antiphonary and the responsoriary for the various chants. These were usually of large size, to enable several monks to chant together from the same book. Smaller books called breviaries (a word that etymologically refers to a compendium or abridgment) were developed to indicate the format of the daily office and assist in identifying the texts to be chosen.

These developed into books that gave in abbreviated form (because they omitted the chants) and in small lettering the whole of the texts, and so could be carried when travelling. Pope Innocent III made them official in the Roman Curia, and the itinerant Franciscan friars adopted the Breviarium Curiae and soon spread its use throughout Europe. By the 14th century, these breviaries contained the entire text of the canonical hours. The invention of printing made it possible to produce them in great numbers.

In its final session, the Council of Trent entrusted to the Pope the revision of the breviary. With his Apostolic Constitution Quod a nobis of 9 July 1568, Pope Pius V promulgated an edition of the breviary, known as the Roman Breviary, which he imposed in the same way in which, two years later, he imposed his Roman Missal. Using language very similar to that in the bull Quo primum, with which he promulgated the Missal – regarding, for instance, the perpetual force of its provisions – he made it obligatory to use the promulgated text everywhere.

He prohibited adding or omitting anything: "We direct that printed copies of this same edict signed by a notary public and made official by an ecclesiastical dignitary possess the same indubitable validity everywhere and in every nation, as if Our manuscript were shown there. Therefore, no one whosoever is permitted to alter this notice of Our permission, statute, ordinance, command, precept, grant, indult, declaration, will, decree, and prohibition. Would anyone, however, presume to commit such an act, he should know that he will incur the wrath of Almighty God and of the Blessed Apostles Peter and Paul."

Pope Clement VIII made changes that he made obligatory on 10 May 1602, 34 years after Pius V's revision. Urban VIII made further changes, including "a profound alteration in the character of some of the hymns. Although some of them without doubt gained in literary style, nevertheless, to the regret of many, they also lost something of their old charm of simplicity and fervour." For the profound revision of the book by Pope Pius X see Reform of the Roman Breviary by Pope Pius X.

Finally, a new revision was made by Pope Paul VI with his Apostolic Constitution Laudis Canticum of 1 November 1970.

Many of the complicated rubrics (or instructions) that governed recitation of the Liturgy were clarified, and the actual method of praying the office was made simpler. Prime had already been abolished by the Second Vatican Council. Of the three intermediate Hours of Terce, Sext and None, only one was to be of strict obligation. Recitation of the psalms and a much increased number of canticles was spread over four weeks instead of one. By a personal decision of Pope Paul VI against the majority view of the revising commission, three imprecatory psalms (58, 83, and 109) were omitted from the psalter and some similar verses were omitted from other psalms, as indicated in the heading of each. These omissions, lamented by Joseph Briody, are attributed in the General Instruction of the Liturgy of the Hours of 1971 to "certain psychological difficulties, even though the imprecatory psalms themselves may be found quoted in the New Testament, e.g. Rev 6:10, and in no way are intended to be used as curses".

Two typical editions of the revised Liturgy of the Hours (Liturgia Horarum) according to the Roman Rite have been published by Rome. The current typical edition is the Liturgia Horarum, editio typica altera, promulgated in 1985 (printed between 1985 and 1987, and reprinted in 2000). This uses the New Vulgate Latin Bible for the readings, psalms and canticles rather than the Clementina.

It has changed the text of some of the readings and responsories in line with the New Vulgate, and it provides the Benedictus and Magnificat on each Sunday with three antiphons that reflect the three-year cycle of Gospel readings. Pope Urban VIII's lamented alterations of the hymns are undone. Verse numberings are added to the Psalms and the longer Scripture readings, while the Psalms are given both the Septuagint numbering and (in parentheses) that of the Masoretic Text. New texts, taken from the Missale Romanum, have been added in an appendix for solemn blessings and the penitential acts.

Thus far, this second Latin typical edition has only been translated in the "Liturgy of the Hours for Africa". The earlier edition has appeared in two English translations, one under the title "Liturgy of the Hours", the other as "The Divine Office".

The General Instruction of the Liturgy of the Hours is the official Papal document regulating the praying and ceremony of the Liturgy of the Hours. It was first promulgated in 1971.

== Obligation of recitation ==
In the Latin Church of the Catholic Church, bishops, priests, and deacons planning to become priests are obliged to recite the full sequence of the hours each day, observing as closely as possible the associated times of day, and using the text of the approved liturgical books that apply to them. Permanent deacons are to do so to the extent determined by their episcopal conference. Members of institutes of consecrated life, societies of apostolic life, or other religious associations (e.g., Benedictine oblates, Third Order Dominicans) who are not clerics and are therefore not necessarily subject to these obligations are bound according to the norm of their constitutions. Members of such institutes and societies who are deacons, priests, or bishops remain bound to their more severe obligation as clergy.

Latin Church clerics can lawfully fulfill their obligation to pray the Office using the edition of the Roman Breviary promulgated by John XXIII in 1961 rather than the current edition of the Liturgy of the Hours. While the 2007 motu proprio Summorum Pontificum states that communities belonging to institutes of religious life and societies of apostolic life require authorization only by their major superiors to use the 1962 edition of the Roman Missal for their conventual or community Mass frequently, habitually or permanently; it makes no such statement regarding use of the 1962 Roman Breviary, which could be allowed by their constitutions.

The constitutions of some institutes of consecrated life, in particular many congregations of Benedictine monks and nuns but also others, oblige them to follow an arrangement of the Psalter whereby all the psalms are recited in the course of a single week.

== See also ==
- Book of hours
- Ramsha
- Little Office of the Blessed Virgin Mary
- The Little Office of the Immaculate Conception
