= The Little Office of the Immaculate Conception =

Devotional office of the Catholic Church

The Little Office of the Immaculate Conception (Latin: Officium parvum Conceptionis Immaculatae) is a devotional office of the Catholic Church, similar in structure to the Divine Office, the Church's official liturgical prayer, though it does not include any Psalms. It was composed towards the end of the 15th Century and long predated the official promulgation of the dogma of the Immaculate Conception of the Blessed Virgin Mary. The Holy See confirmed the Office in 1615.

== Structure ==
The essential structure of the Little Office of the Immaculate Conception mirrors that of the Divine Office, that is, the office is composed of Matins, Prime, Terce, Sext, None, Vespers and Compline, with the exception of Lauds and the addition of a special concluding prayer. Unlike the Divine Office, however, the Little Office of the immaculate conception (not to be confused with the little office of the Blessed Virgin Mary, which does contain psalms ) does not include any psalms.

== Endorsement ==
The Little Office currently has prescribed to it a partial indulgence by the Apostolic Penitentiary, as per section 3 of grant number 22 of the fourth edition of the Holy See's Enchiridion Indulgentiarum:

A partial indulgence is granted to the faithful who piously recite an approved office (e.g. of the Passion of Our Lord Jesus Christ, the Most Sacred Heart of Jesus, the Blessed Virgin Mary, the Immaculate Conception, or St. Joseph).

== Translations ==
A Polish translation of the Little Office was printed in the year 1616. Neither the author nor the translator of the Polish text of the Office are known, though the excellent Polish translation made the Office accessible to Poles and ensured its popularity. It is presumed that the translation was done by a Jesuit priest in Kraków or perhaps the first translator of the Bible into Polish, Jakub Wujek. A Latin text, approved by the Holy See, was released from the press of the Apostolic Camera in 1838.

== Bibliography ==
S. Pascale-Dominique Nau, Godzinki Petites heures de l'Immaculée Conception (general introduction and commentary) Eds Universitaires Européennes, 2017.

S. Pascale-Dominique Nau, Godzinki: The Little Hours of the Immaculate Conception of the Blessed Virgin Mary (history, general analysis and translation) Rome, 2013 .
