= Church of San Lucas, Toledo =

Church in Toledo, Castile-La Mancha, Spain

Coordinates: 39.8543°N 4.0206°W

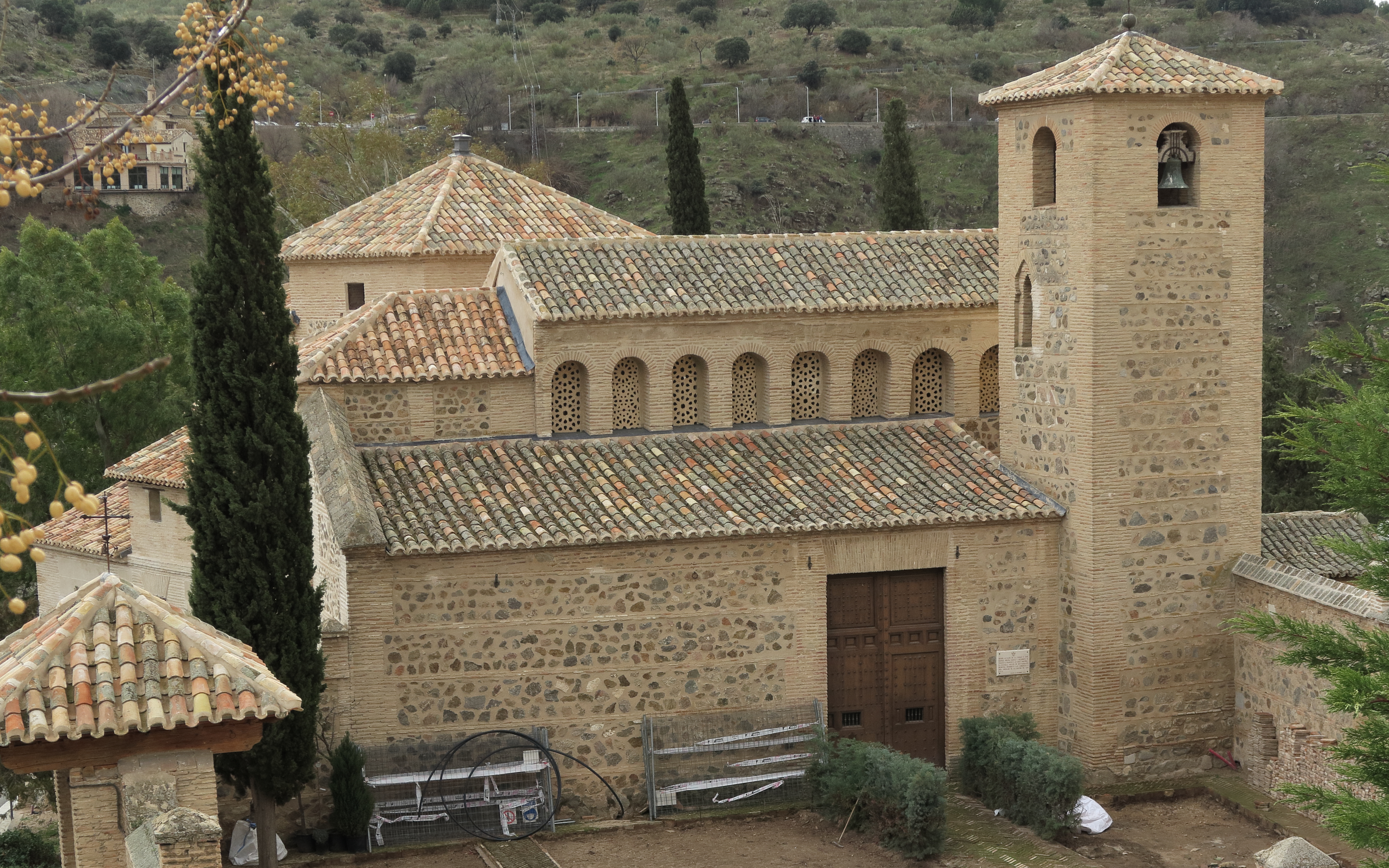
Iglesia de San Lucas

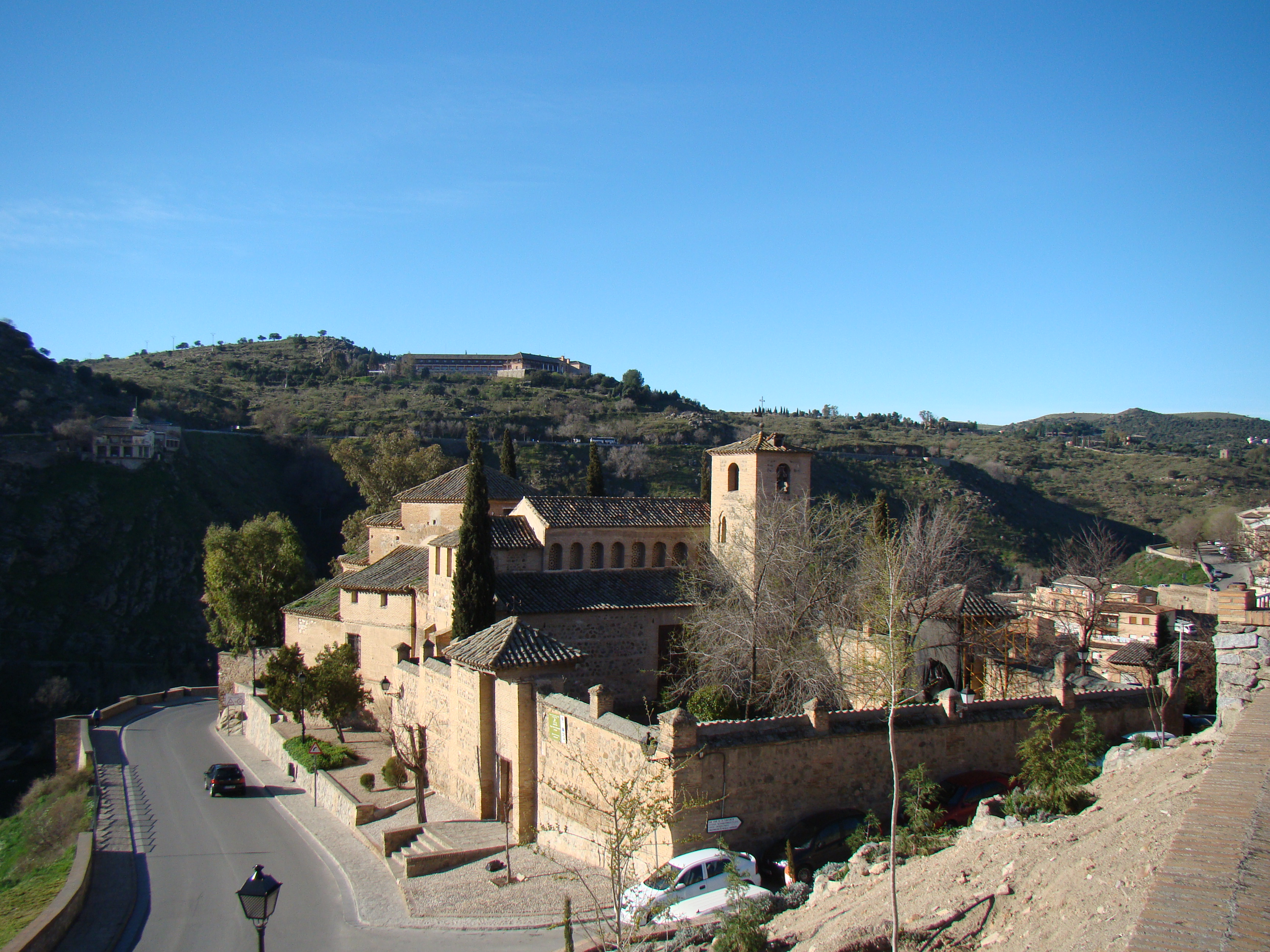
Complete view of the church

The Church of San Lucas (Spanish: Iglesia de San Lucas) is located in front of the Bu hill at southeast of the city of Toledo, Castile-La Mancha, Spain. Behind a high wall, attached to the church, was located the old parish cemetery, where it is told that the last Mozarabs of the city were buried.

Most probably it was built in Mozarab style in the 12th-century, in the 17th century a Baroque chapel was added to it housing the Virgen de Esperanza.

The church is cited in a poem attributed to St. Ildefonsus, according to which it was erected in 641 by Evancio, a son of Nicholas, who married Blesila and who were the grandfathers of St. Ildefonsus. This documentary evidence cannot be confirmed and the building could even be a mosque adapted as a Christian church, due to the irregular arrangement of the south wall and the asymmetry of the immediate nave of the epistle.

The church served one of the parishes of Toledo that had the privilege to maintain the Mozarabic Rite after the Reconquista.
