= Mozarabic Rite =

Liturgical rite of the Catholic Church and the Anglican Church in Spain and Portugal

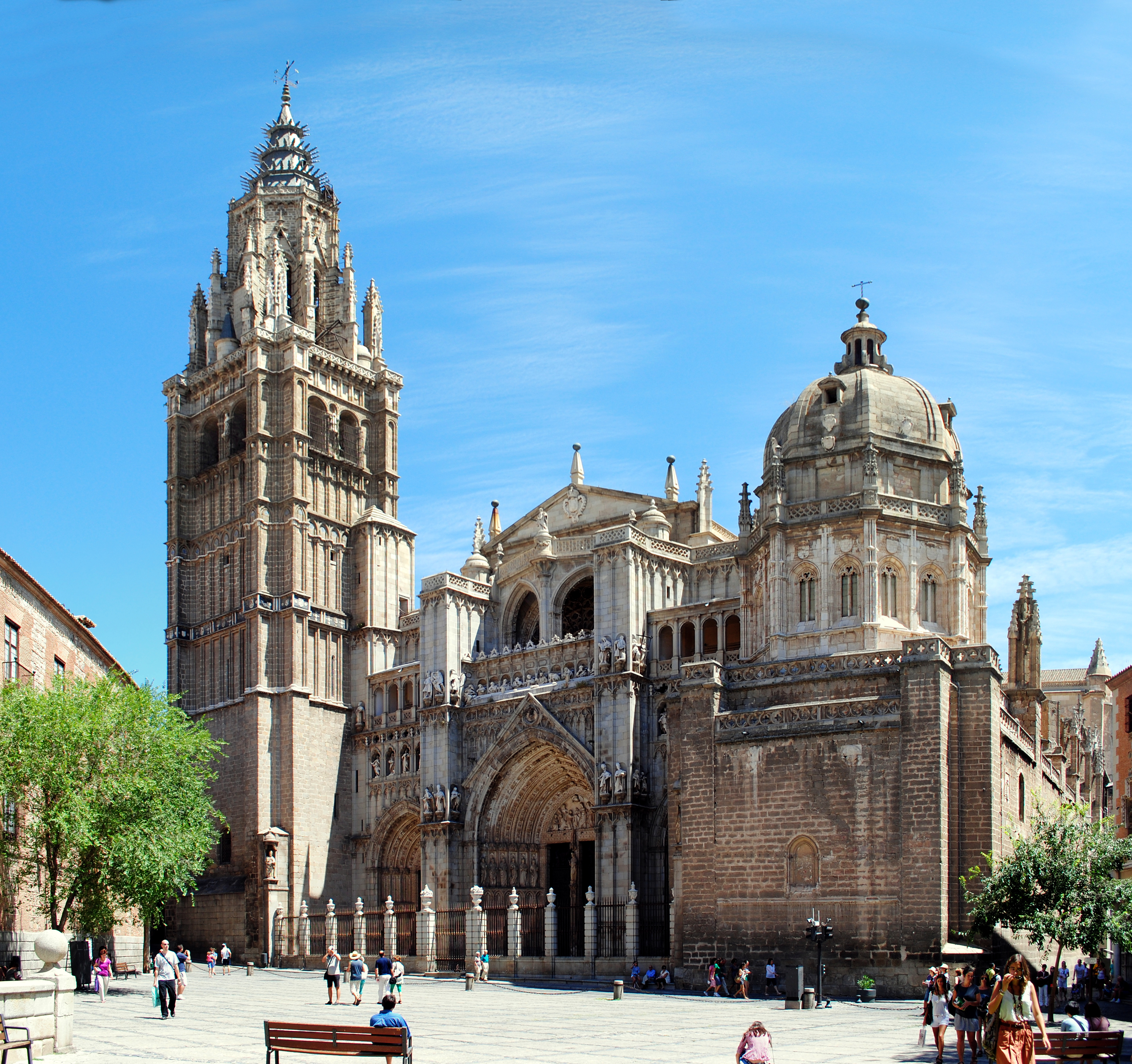
Toledo Cathedral

The Mozarabic Rite (Spanish: rito mozárabe, Portuguese: rito moçárabe, Catalan: ritu mossàrab), officially called the Hispanic Rite (Spanish: Rito hispánico, Portuguese: rito hispânico, Catalan: ritu hispà), and in the past also called the Visigothic Rite, is a liturgical rite of the Latin Church once used generally in the Iberian Peninsula (Hispania), in what is now Spain and Portugal. While the liturgy is often called 'Mozarabic' after the Christian communities that lived under Muslim rulers in Al-Andalus that preserved its use, the rite itself developed before and during the Visigothic period. After experiencing a period of decline during the Reconquista, when it was superseded by the Roman Rite in the Christian states of Iberia as part of a wider programme of liturgical standardization within the Catholic Church, efforts were taken in the 16th century to revive the rite and ensure its continued presence in the city of Toledo, where it is still celebrated today. It is also celebrated on a more widespread basis throughout Spain and, by special dispensation, in other countries, though only on special occasions.

In addition to its use within the Catholic Church, the rite (or elements from it) has also been adopted by Western Rite Orthodox congregations and the Spanish Reformed Episcopal Church.

== History ==
=== Formation of liturgical rites ===
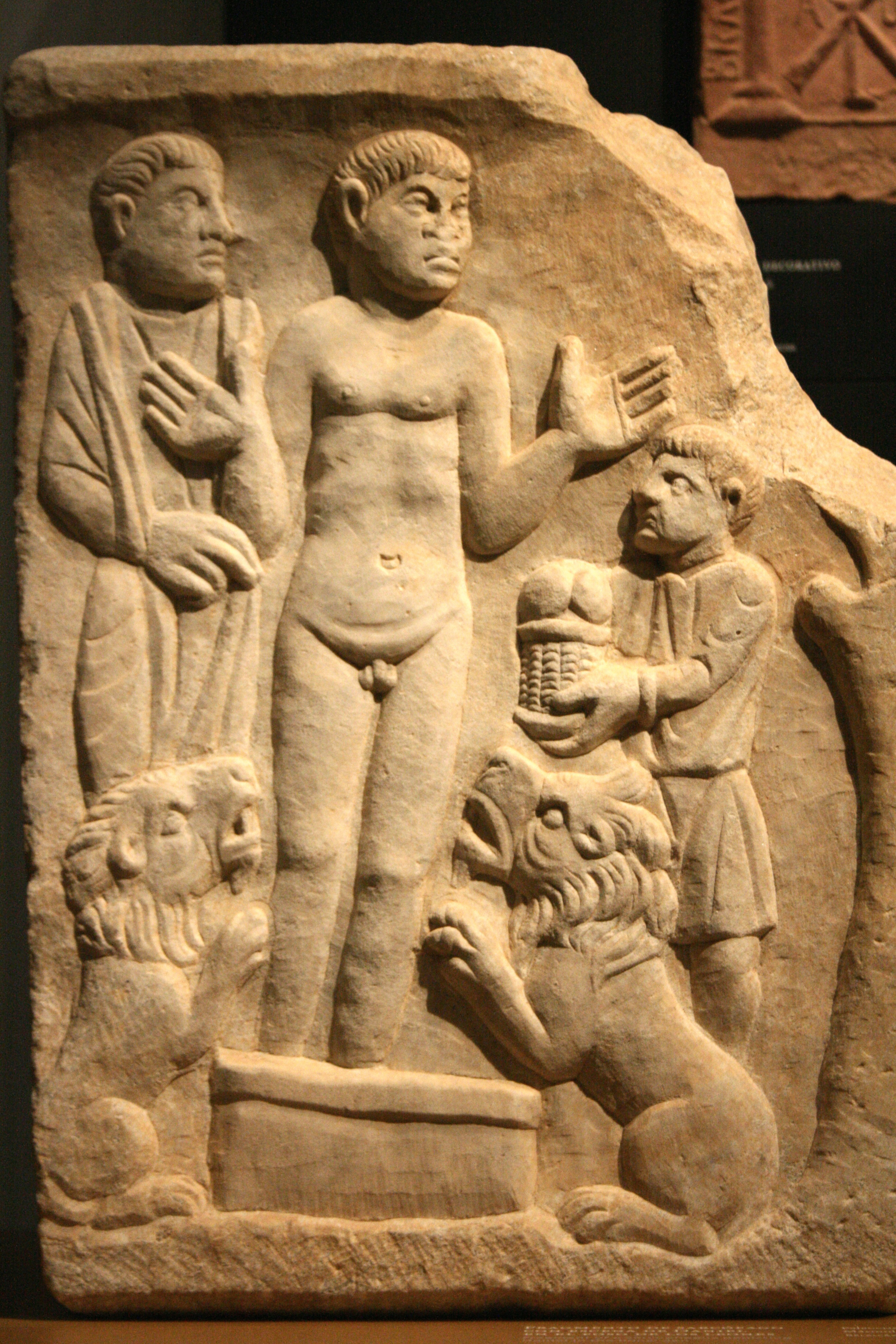
Early Christian (4th century) sarcophagus from Belalcázar, Córdoba depicting the prophet Daniel

Ritual worship surrounding the Eucharist in the early Church was not scripted with precise rubrics as is the norm today. One of the earliest known documents setting down the nature of Eucharistic celebration is the Didache, dating from 70–140 (see historical roots of Catholic Eucharistic theology). Few details are known of early forms of the liturgy, or worship, in the first three centuries, but there was some diversity of practice; Justin Martyr, however gave one example of early Christian liturgical practice in his First Apology (AD 155–157).

As Christianity gained dominance in the wake of the conversion of Constantine I early in the fourth century, there was a period of liturgical development as the communities emerged from smaller gatherings to large assemblies in public halls and new churches. This time of development saw the combination of embellishment of existing practices with the exchange of ideas and practices from other communities. These mutual processes resulted both in greater diversity and in certain unifying factors within the liturgy from the merging of forms throughout major cities and regions. The liturgies of the patriarchal cities in particular had greater influence on their regions so that by the 5th century it becomes possible to distinguish among several families of liturgies, in particular the Armenian, Alexandrian, Antiochene, Byzantine, West Syriac Rite and East Syriac Rite families in the East, and in the Latin West, the African (completely lost), Gallican, Celtic, Ambrosian, Roman, and Hispanic (Mozarabic) families. These settled into fairly stable forms that continued to evolve, but none without some influence from outside.

In the West, the liturgy in Roman Africa was lost as the Church there was weakened by internal division and then the Vandal invasion, and then was extinguished in the wake of the Islamic ascendancy. In Gaul, the fascination of the Franks with Roman liturgy led them to begin adopting the Roman Rite, a process that was confirmed and promoted by Charlemagne as an aid to imperial unity.

=== The emergence of the Hispanic Rite ===
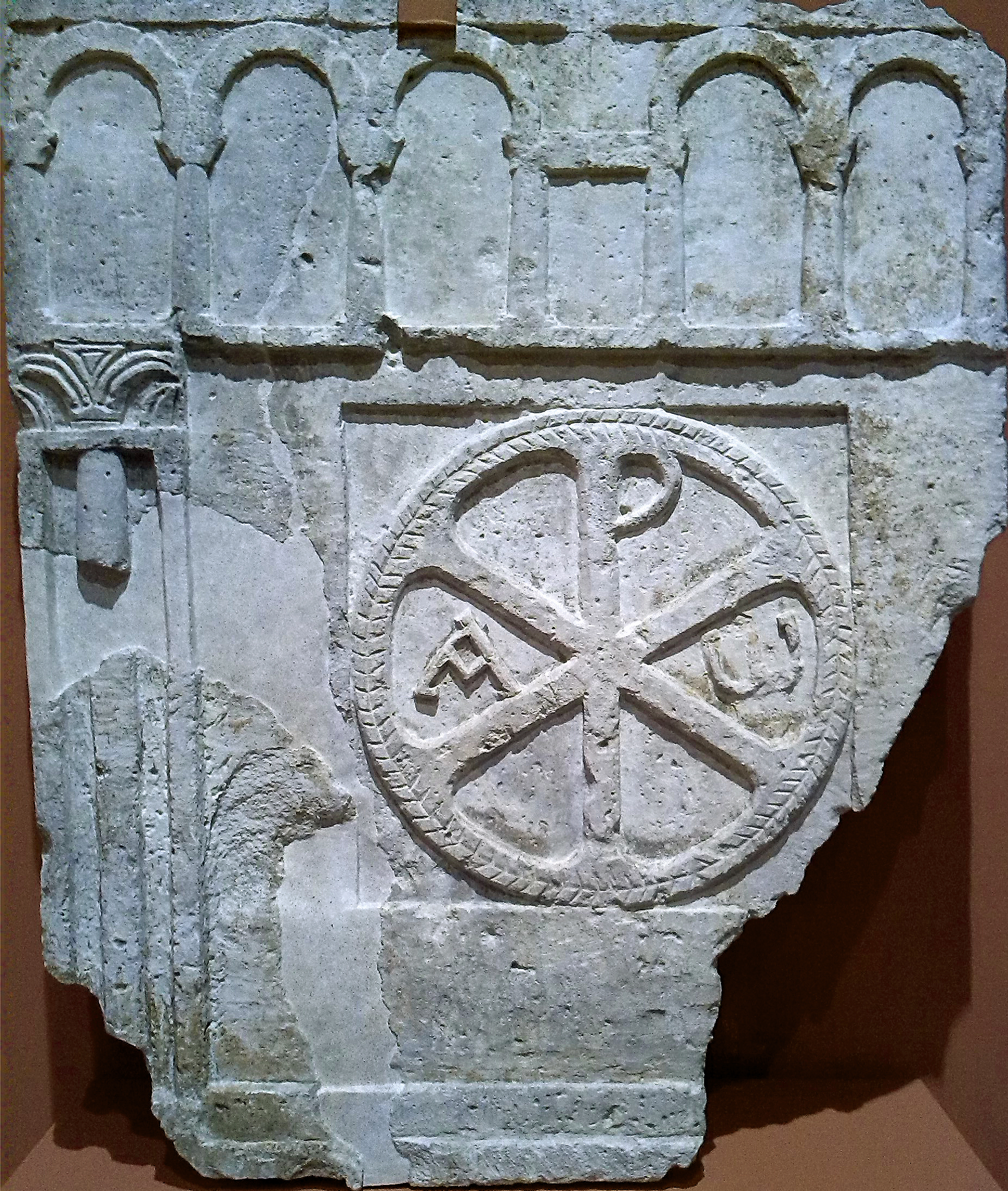
Chi-rho from the Villa Fortunatus in Huesca, Aragon (6th century)

From 507, the Visigoths, who were Arian Christians, maintained their kingdom at Toledo. That there was already a distinct liturgical tradition in Hispania prior to their arrival is evidenced by the fact that the Hispanic liturgy lacks any Arian influence. Indeed, certain elements of this rite (e.g. the distinctive emphasis on "Trinity" as a title of address in many prayers, the recitation of the Creed in the liturgy) have been interpreted as a reaction to Visigothic Arianism.

Though reasonably tolerant, the Visigoths controlled episcopal appointments, which may have provoked the first extant expression of papal concern in Pope Vigilius's letter to the bishop of Braga in 538, dealing with baptism, penance and reconsecration of churches. Among those sympathetic to Rome was Leander, archbishop of Seville, who had formed a friendship with Pope Gregory the Great while in Constantinople. Leander presided over the Third Council of Toledo in 589, during which King Reccared I formally brought the Visigoths into Catholicism. The same council also formally introduced the controversial Filioque clause into the Nicene Creed, which would later prove to be an impetus for the Great Schism of 1054. Reccared's conversion marked the integration of Visigoths and Hispano-Romans into one liturgy.

It was under Visigothic aegis that the Hispanic liturgy reached its point of greatest development; new rituals, euchology, and hymns were added to the liturgical rites, and efforts were made to standardize Christian religious practices throughout the peninsula. Two main traditions emerged as a result of these processes: Tradition A from the northern territories and Tradition B from the south. Isidore, Leander's brother and successor, presided over the Fourth Council of Toledo in 633, which established uniform chants for the Divine Office and the Eucharistic liturgy. Concerns over ritual practices were reflected in his De ecclesiasticis officiis.

One notable feature of the Hispanic Rite – specifically, the southern Tradition B – is the presence of Eastern (Byzantine) characteristics. The establishment of the short-lived Byzantine province of Spania in the south by Justinian I may have contributed to this influence; Leander's stay in Byzantium might also have been another factor.

Further development occurred under the archbishops of Toledo during the mid to late 7th century: Eugenius II (646–657), his nephew and successor Ildefonsus (657–667), and Julian (680–690). This concluded the creative development of the Hispanic liturgy before the Umayyad conquest of 711.

=== Under Muslim rule and the Reconquista ===
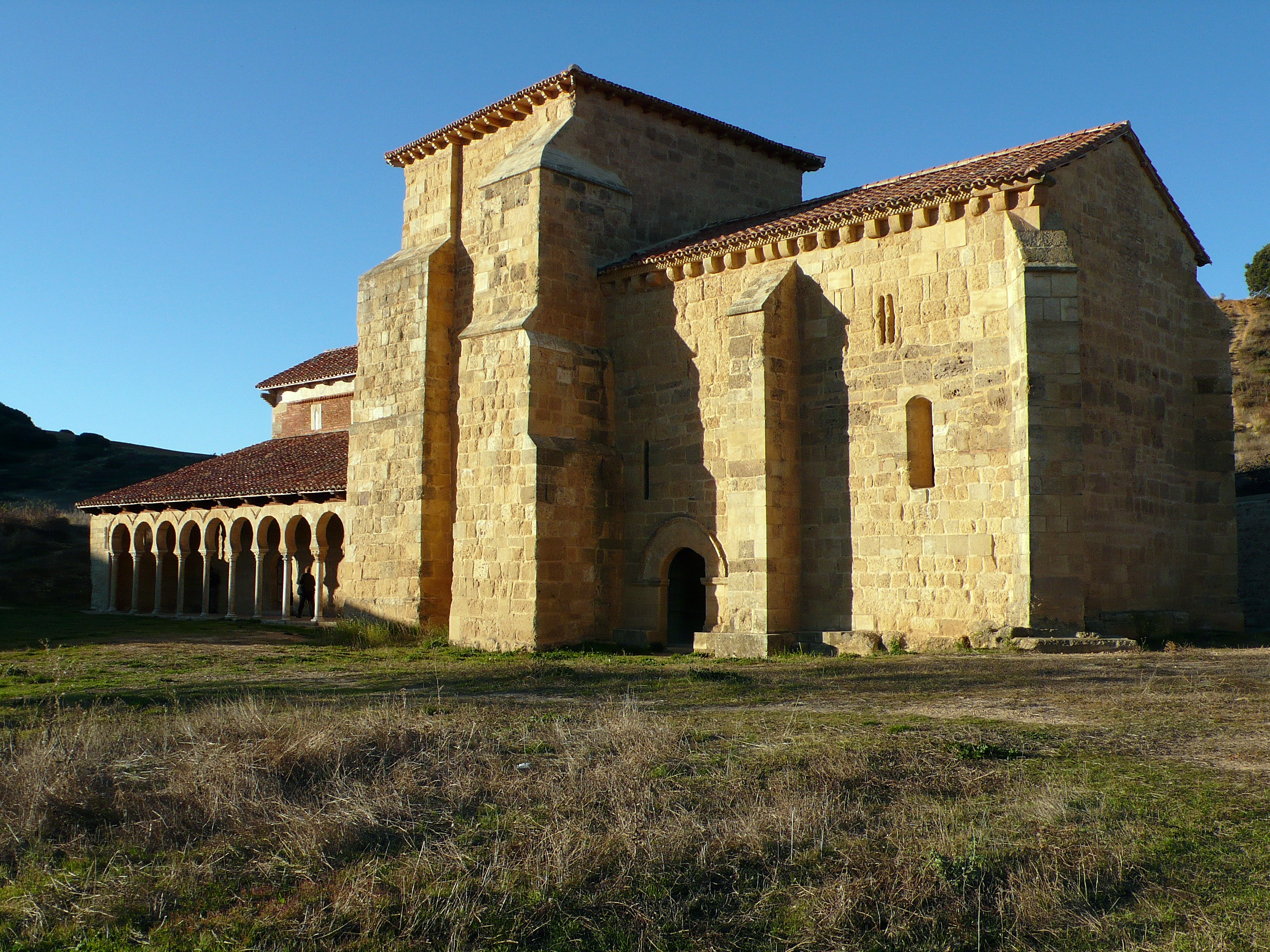
The Monastery of San Miguel de Escalada in León

The Islamic conquest of the Iberian Peninsula in 711 checked the development of the Hispanic Rite. Although a band of Christians from the north asserted independence, eventually leading to the Reconquista, the majority of the Christian population and the religious hierarchy were situated in areas dominated by Muslims. Such Christians who lived under Moorish rule, and later came to adopt elements of Arabic culture while retaining their own, were termed Mozarabs. While the Islamic authorities accorded the Mozarabs dhimmi status (thus allowing them to practice their religion with certain restrictions), public displays of faith and the construction of new churches were prohibited, which limited the ability of the rite to develop naturally and perhaps even contributed to an attitude of conservatism. Nevertheless, as territories were taken back by Christians in the north, some Christians in the south fled to liberated areas and in certain cases even contributed to efforts at repopulation of abandoned towns, particularly in the Kingdom of León. These refugees continued to perform their liturgy and eventually to resume its development. Consequently, partially due to pressure from Rome, councils dedicated to the rite's reform and development took place at León (1020), Coyanza (1055), and Compostela (1056).

As the Christian kingdoms of the north reconquered Hispania, the kings sought to re-establish connections with the rest of Christian Europe and the Papacy. Charlemagne's efforts to impose the Roman liturgy as the standard in the Frankish realms at the 8th century made headway into the Catalan regions first during the 9th century, then eventually in the 11th century to the other reconquered northern realms. Unity in liturgical practice was strongly encouraged by Rome and after reconquest typically the Roman Rite was installed.

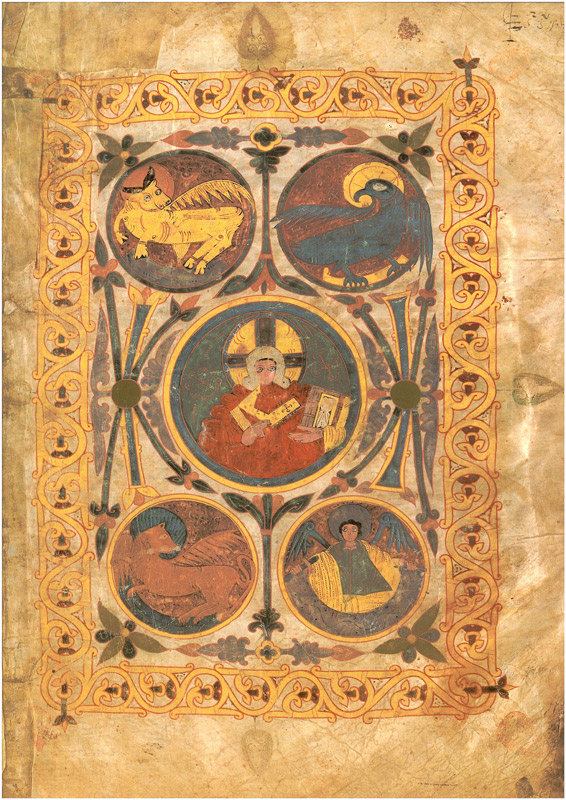
Maiestas Domini and the symbols of the Four Evangelists from the León Bible of 960

One factor for the spread of the Roman liturgy into Iberia was the alliances the Christian kings made with Frankish rulers and monks. King Sancho III of Navarre (1000–1035) and his son Ferdinand I of León (1035–1065) for instance were connected with the monastery of Cluny and developed the pilgrimage route to Santiago de Compostela, which brought in thousands of French and northern European pilgrims and with them, their influences. Another factor was the suspicion that the Hispanic liturgy might be unorthodox or heretical. Certain Mozarab Christian theologians such as Archbishop Elipandus of Toledo (754/783–808?), during the course of their attempt to explain Christology in a way easily understood by Muslim authorities, have been accused of falling into Adoptionism (i.e. that Jesus was adopted by the Father as the Son of God). Though the other Mozarab bishops agreed with the consensus and condemned Elipandus' Christology, the specter of Adoptionism contributed to the assessment that the Hispanic Rite was of dubious orthodoxy, especially due to Elipandus' use of quotations from the liturgical tradition in support of his teachings.

It was due to these suspicions that in 924, Pope John X sent a papal legate named Zanello to investigate the Rite. Zanello spoke favorably of the Rite, and the Pope gave a new approbation to it, requiring only to change the Words of Institution to that of the Roman one. Spanish clergy gradually started to use the Roman formula, though there is no evidence whether it was done consistently.

By the late 11th century, during the papacies of Nicholas II (1059–1061), Alexander II (1061–1073), Gregory VII (1073–1085), and Urban II (1088–1099), however, the Hispanic liturgy was increasingly marginalized in favor of the Roman Rite. Attempts to impose the Roman Rite in Milan, where the Ambrosian Rite is practiced even to this day, also occurred around this time. Alexander II, for instance, effected the establishment of the Roman liturgy in Aragon through the papal legate Hugh Candidus, whose work also resulted in its spread to Navarre. While the Council of Mantua in 1067 declared the Hispanic Rite to be free of heresy, King Sancho Ramírez of Aragon was in favor of the change.

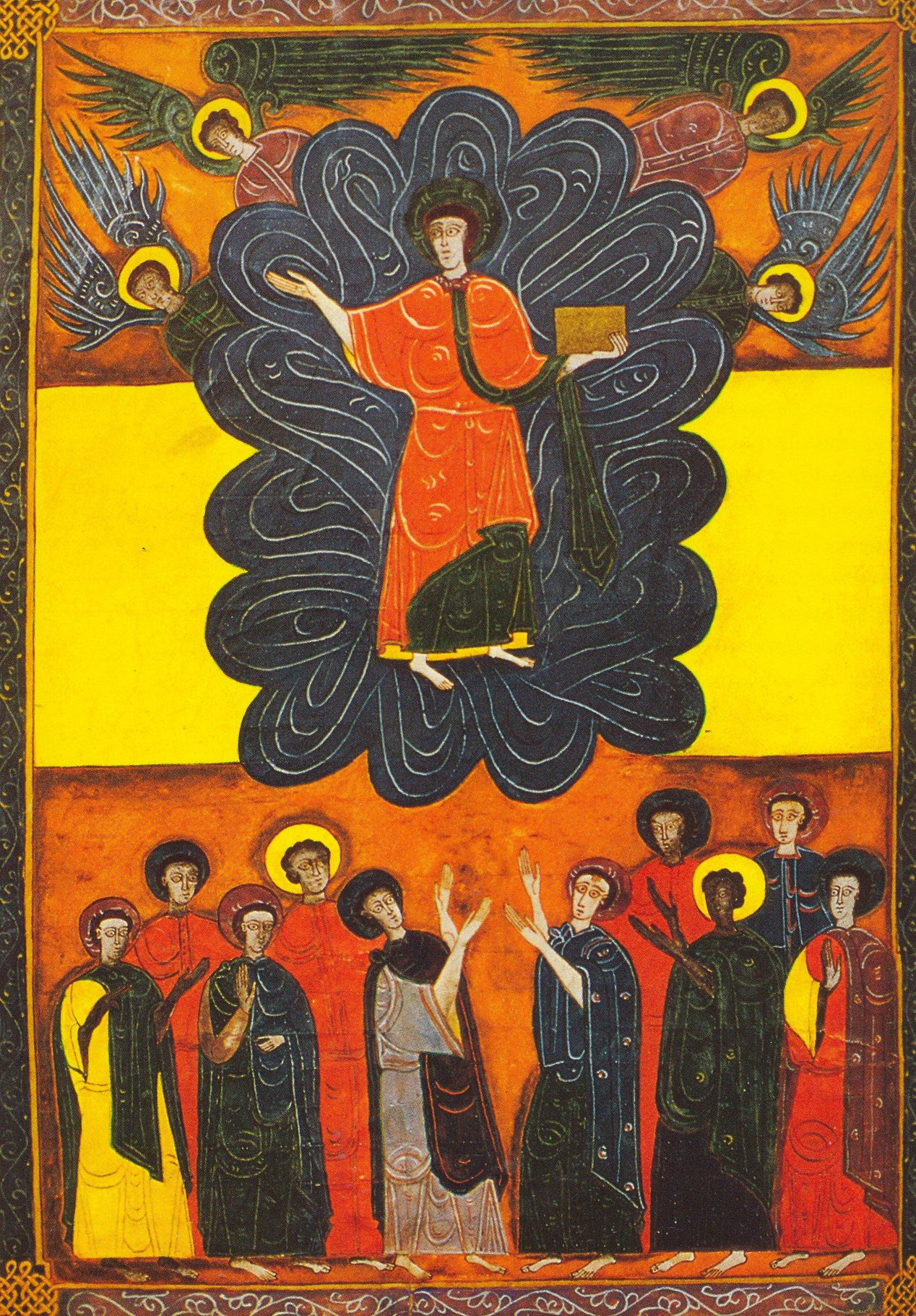
The Second Coming of Christ (Facundus Beatus, AD 1047)

In a similar vein, Gregory VII insisted upon Roman use in Castile, despite considerable opposition. Legend says that when King Alfonso VI of Castile, who was well disposed to the Roman Rite and to the Cluniac Reforms, conquered Toledo in 1085, he tried to ascertain which rite was superior through a number of ordeals, one of which involved throwing one book for each rite into a bonfire. In one version, the Hispanic book was little damaged whilst the Roman one was consumed; another version has both books survive – the Hispanic book was unscathed while the Roman one was ejected from the fire.

Despite the outcome of these ordeals, the king insisted on the introduction of the Roman Rite; a council convened by Alfonso at Burgos in 1080 led to the official abandonment of the Hispanic Rite. As part of his program to systematically replace the Old Hispanic liturgy with the Roman one in his domain, Alfonso installed Cluniac monks in the monasteries of Silos and San Millán de la Cogolla and French prelates such as Bernard of Sédirac in Toledo and other cities of his realm. While the king made concessions to the Mozarab community of Toledo by allowing the Rite to continue in six parishes of the city (San Sebastián, San Torcuato, Santas Justa y Rufina, San Lucas, San Marcos, and Santa Eulalia), Mozarabic church officials could not become canons of the cathedral or take on roles of authority (such as the episcopacy) unless they began to celebrate the Roman Rite exclusively. This led to a diminishment in the ranks of Mozarabic clergy, so that by the mid-15th century there were few priests to minister to the community and fewer still who could read the Visigothic script used in the ancient liturgical books. Lay Mozarabs themselves increasingly began to integrate with the "Latins" (i.e. adherents of the Roman Rite) and started leaving Toledo for other areas, so that the number of Mozarabs remaining in the city from the 11th century on were numerically too small to sustain the six parishes allowed to continue the performance of the old rite.

=== Preservation, decline, and revival ===
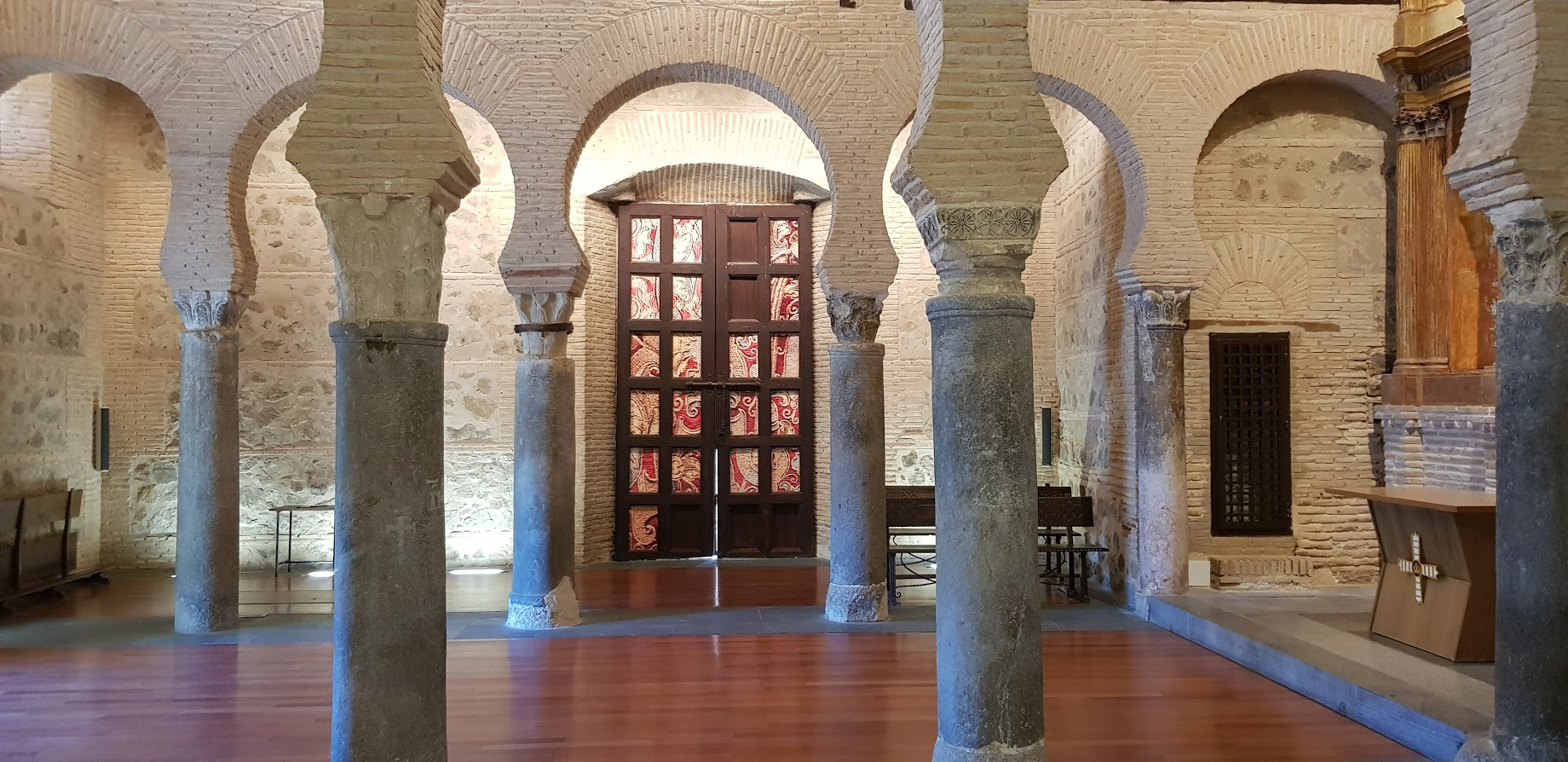
Interior of the San Sebastián Church in Toledo, one of the historical Mozarabic parishes within the city

Despite the factors that threatened the Hispanic Rite's survival, there were also overriding factors that contributed to its preservation, which are linked to the same factors working against the rite.

- The Moorish conquest contributed to a conservative stance on the part of those who remained Christian, with efforts being made to preserve the liturgy as authentically as possible. Manuscripts written in the Visigothic script were copied and recopied by trained scribes in the Mozarab community; indeed, the oldest extant manuscripts for the rite come from the period just before the end of the Islamic era in Toledo.
- Efforts at imposing the Roman Rite in the reconquered areas led Mozarabs to compile their manuscripts in a form that would be acceptable to Roman authorities. When Hugh Candidus raised the issue of the rite's orthodoxy to Ferdinand I, a compilation of Mozarabic manuscripts were sent along with a commission of bishops to Alexander II, who approved of the rite, thus granting it a brief reprieve until the Council of Burgos in 1080.
- Alfonso VI's desire to impose the Roman Rite in his realms was mitigated by the agreement (fuero) he made with the Mozarabs of Toledo, in which the Mozarabs, in exchange for cooperating with the king in the reconquest of other territories, apparently asserted their privileges and extended these to the continued celebration of their ancestral liturgy, which was seen as an integral part of Mozarabic identity.

Although there is evidence of Mozarabic communities outside Toledo that continued to preserve Hispanic liturgical practices well into the 13th century, in Toledo itself both the community and the rite underwent a period of slow decay. The Roman Rite became so widespread that it was introduced even into the Mozarabic parishes (partly in response to the influx of Roman parishioners in these churches), so that the old rite was only used for certain special days, and even then in a corrupted form based on old and imperfectly understood manuscripts. Intermarriage with adherents of the Roman liturgy and the gradual integration of Mozarabs into mainstream society also contributed to the decline of parishioners in the surviving Mozarabic churches, which became impoverished as a result, leading to an exodus of clerics to Roman parishes.

While Mozarabic clergy were obligated to abandon the Hispanic liturgy in order to receive ecclesiastical appointments, such clerics who shifted from Hispanic to Roman soon began to leave their mark on the Roman liturgy as performed in the cathedral of Toledo, leading to the creation of the Missale Mixtum Toletanum, which shows Mozarabic influences (such as the inclusion of local saints in the calendar), in the 15th century.

==== Early attempts at revival ====
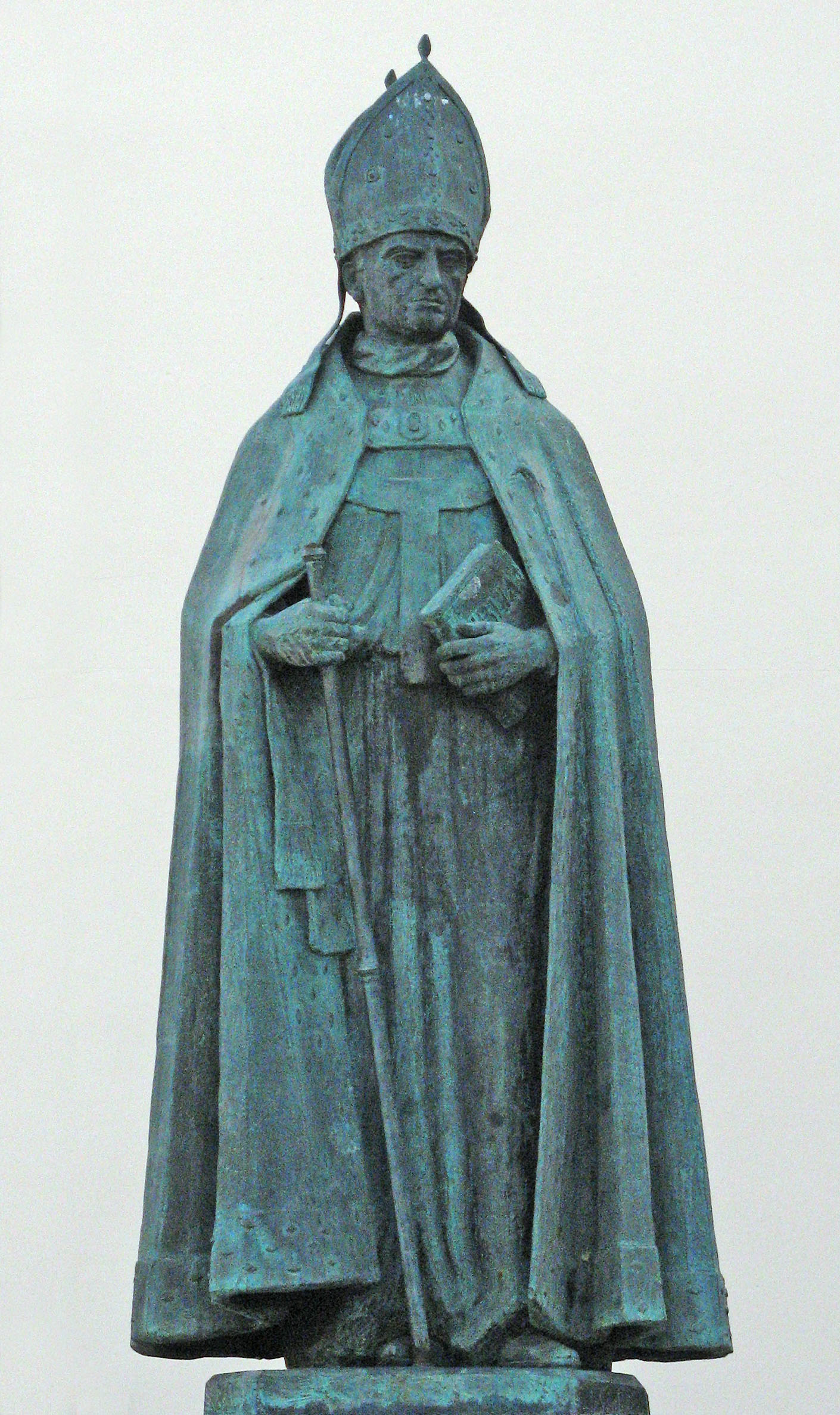
Monument to Archbishop Carrillo, Alcalá de Henares

There were a number of major attempts in reviving the decrepit Mozarabic Rite during the late medieval period. At the end of the 13th century, Archbishop Gonzalo Pérez Gudiel of Toledo (1280–1299), a Mozarab by blood, was concerned enough about the grave circumstances of the rite to entrust archdean Jofré de Loaysa with the renewal of the Mozarabic clergy and the copying of new liturgical books, giving new life to the Mozarab community and its rite.

In 1436, Juan Vázquez de Cepeda, Bishop of Segovia, left in his will benefices for the creation of a chapel and center of Mozarabic studies in his villa at Aniago near Valladolid. He claimed that the Hispanic Rite was suffering from neglect and that those charged with its celebration in Toledo had forgotten how to correctly perform the chants and liturgy. Unfortunately, due to insufficient funds as well as a lack of connection to any living Mozarab community, the foundation lasted for only five years before passing into the hands of the Carthusian Order.

The continued deterioration of the rite was also a matter of concern for Archbishop of Toledo Alonso Carrillo (1446–1482). Calling together a synod at Alcalá de Henares in 1480, Carillo decried the decadence that had befallen the Rite due to the fact that the benefices destined for its celebration had been assigned to clerics with no real knowledge of or interest in the rite. He attempted to rectify the situation by withholding benefices from ignorant clergy, and insisting that Rite be celebrated by knowledgeable ones. These actions, among others, laid the groundwork for Cardinal Jiménez de Cisneros's reform in 1500–1502.

In 1484, Carillo's successor, Cardinal Pedro González de Mendoza (1482–1495), ordered Mozarabic parishes were to be respected as free institutions, and attempted to curb the decline of these parishes by limiting the incursions of Roman parishioners into these churches, as well as the exodus of Mozarabs (and their taxes) to wealthier Roman parishes. The Mozarabic clergy sought papal confirmation of Mendoza's decree, and obtained it from Pope Innocent VII in the bull Fiat ut petitur. Despite this papal intervention, Mozarabic parishes and their liturgy continued to decline so that by 1500, the number of Mozarab Christians within the city of Toledo were down to six, divided between three parishes.

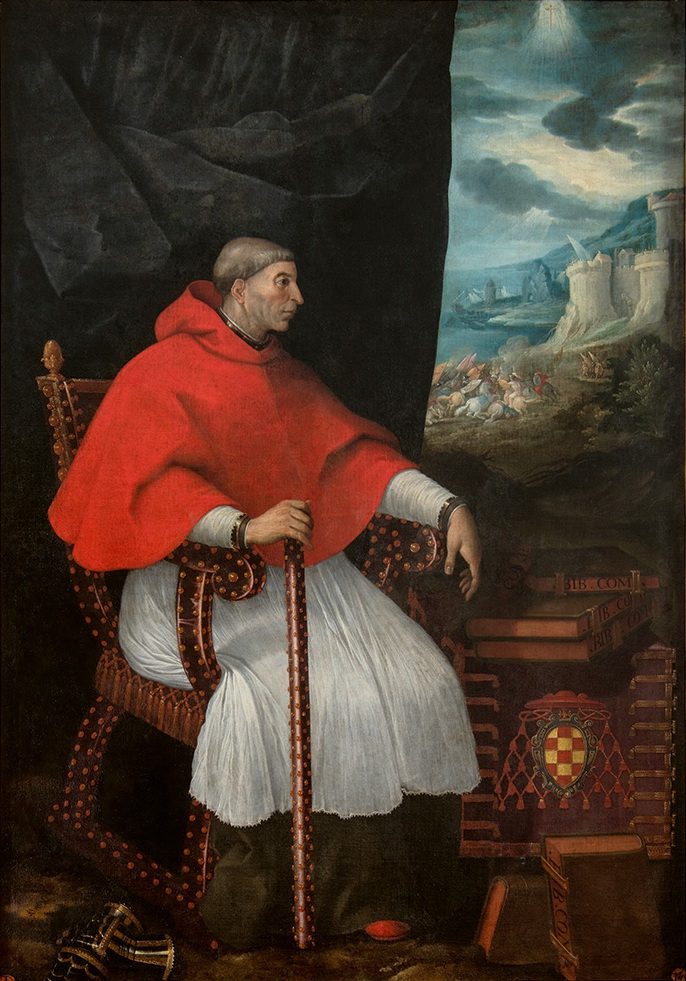
Cardinal Francisco Jiménez de Cisneros by Eugenio Cajés (1604)

==== Cardinal Cisneros's reforms ====
Cardinal Francisco Jiménez de Cisneros succeeded Mendoza as Archbishop of Toledo after the latter's death in 1495. It is due to his efforts that the Hispanic/Mozarabic Rite survived down to the present day.

During a visit to the cathedral library in 1497, it is said Cisneros was shown ancient Mozarabic liturgical manuscripts. He was so impressed that he ordered these taken to his personal library in order to examine them more closely. It is likely that this occasioned his decision to make known and available to scholars and others the texts of the Hispanic liturgy and Divine Office. To facilitate this he had them published by what was then a new technology: the printing press.

The first printed Mozarabic missal, the Missale Mixtum secundum regulam beati Isidori, appeared in 1500, followed two years later by a breviary (the Breviarium secundum regulam beati Isidori). The preparation of the missal's text was the work of canon Alfonso Ortiz, who had already begun work on Mozarabic codices under Cisneros' predecessor Cardinal Mendoza, and three Mozarabic priests: Alfonso Martínez Yepes (Santa Eulalia), Antonio Rodrigues (Santas Justa y Rufina), and Jerónimo Gutiérrez (San Lucas).

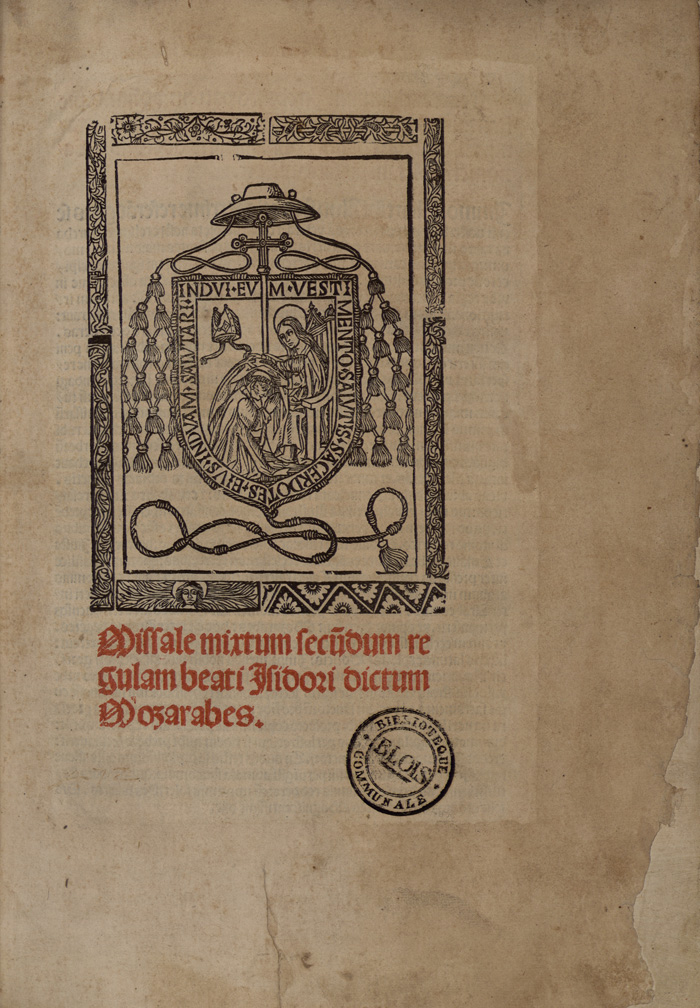
Title page of the Missale Mixtum secundum regulam beati Isidori (1500)

In the missal's preface, Ortiz lays out the five general norms underlying the reform: the identification of extant manuscript; the license to edit and rewrite according to the original style; the excision of material deemed late or inauthentic; the formatting of the text in a logical manner; and the printing of the books in a readable form.

The resulting missal and breviary were not critical editions in the modern sense. Rather than being authentic representatives of the Hispanic tradition, later liturgists have found the books to be more of a combination of material found in different Mozarabic manuscripts, with gaps being filled in by invented services based on precedent set by earlier services, and borrowings from the Roman liturgy (e.g. preliminary prayers for the Mass, Roman feasts such as Trinity Sunday and Corpus Christi). The content of the printed missal and breviary is so inconsistent that Eugene de Robles, who wrote on the Mozarabic liturgy during the 17th century, considered the label Mixtum to be a reference to the mixed-up content.

In between the publication of the missal and the breviary, Cisneros instituted a chapel in the cathedral's cloister with a college of thirteen priests who were to conduct daily celebration of the Mozarabic liturgy. The chaplains of the Capilla Mozárabe (also known as the Corpus Christi Chapel) were to be of good character, well-versed in the recitation and singing of the Mozarabic liturgy. In addition to these thirteen chaplains, a sacristan (also required to be a priest), joined by two altar boys (mozos, monaguillos, or clerizones), were to assist in the liturgy. The foundation of the chapel was approved by Pope Julius II on 20 September 1508, and the first Mozarabic Mass was held therein on 15 July 1511. Similar institutions dedicated to the preservation of the Hispanic liturgy were founded in other cities during the same century such as the Capilla de San Salvador (a.k.a. the Capilla de Talavera) in the Old Cathedral of Salamanca, or a church in Valladolid dedicated to Saint Mary Magdalene, but these later fell into decline or became extinct.

The resulting liturgical books reflected Cisneros's plan of reform including the selection of the texts and order of worship of Tradition B, which came to be attributed to Isidore of Seville. It seems this choice was made based on Isidore's status in the Catholic Church as a whole as well as the interests of Cisneros and Ortiz to stress the antiquity of Spanish literary works. Thus Isidore is given pride of place in the colophon to the titles of the missal and breviary, which reads secundum regulam beati Isidori.

==== Andrés Marcos Burriel ====
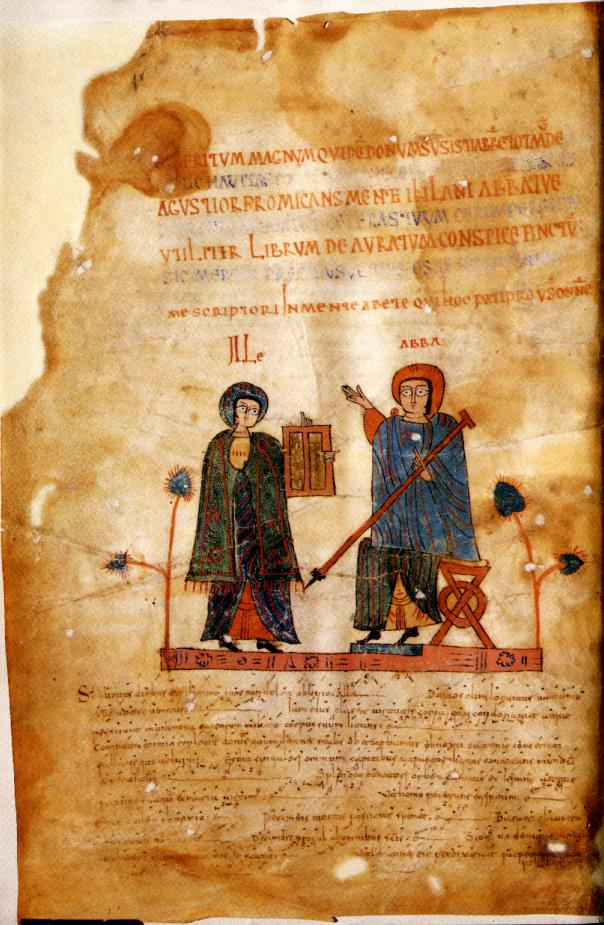
The Mozarabic Antiphonary of León (11th century)

The form of the Mozarabic liturgy as contained in the missal and breviary edited by Ortiz under Cardinal Cisneros's patronage soon became the predominant version of the rite and provided the basis for new editions published in the 18th century. Because of the prevailing assumption that Ortiz had simply printed the contents of the ancient liturgical books, the existence of his editions caused scholars to neglect the actual manuscripts of the rite.

The first scholar to attempt a thorough analysis of the Mozarabic liturgical codices was the Jesuit polymath Andrés Marcos Burriel (1719–1762) in the mid-18th century, who had noticed discrepancies between the printed editions and the manuscripts. After being appointed as the director of the short-lived Royal Commission on the Archives by Ferdinand VI in 1749, formed by the government to obtain evidence for the royal patronage of church benefices in Spain, Burriel took advantage of his position to research the ancient manuscripts of the Hispanic Rite in Toledo's cathedral library with the help of paleographer Francisco Xavier de Santiago Palomares (1728–1796), who made copies of the texts. The abrupt end of the Commission in 1755 and the rise of the anti-Jesuit Ricardo Wall as prime minister eventually put a stop to Burriel's study. As he never published the results of his liturgical research during his lifetime, they went unnoticed until the 20th century; even today, most of his papers on the Hispanic liturgy remain largely unexplored.

==== Minor reforms under Cardinal Lorenzana ====
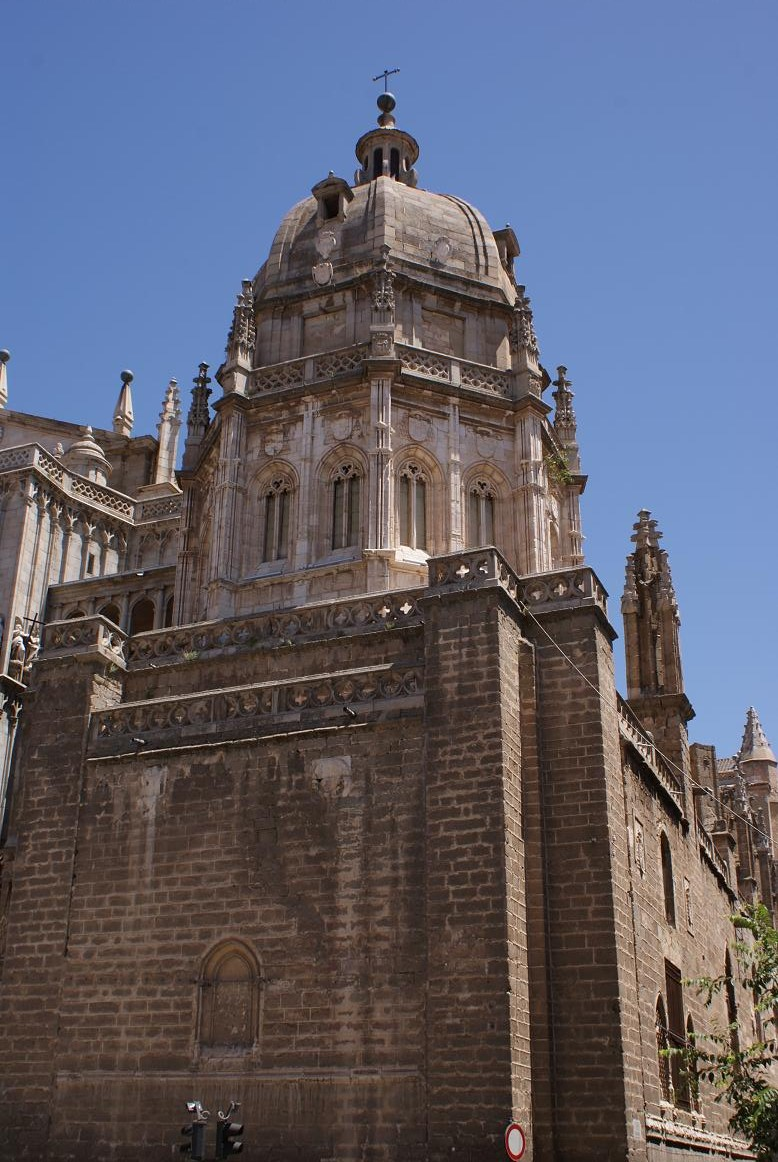
The Mozarabic Chapel (Capilla Mozárabe) in the Cathedral of Toledo

Cardinal Francisco Antonio de Lorenzana became Archbishop of Toledo in 1772 after serving as the Archbishop of Mexico City (1766–1770). During his time in Mexico, Lorenzana showed an interest in the rite, which led to the publication of the Missale Omnium Offerentium in 1770. After his return to Spain, he published a new edition of the breviary under the title of Breviarium Gothicum in 1775 and made improvements to the cathedral's Capilla Mozárabe. After Lorenzana went to Rome at the request of Pope Pius II, he then began a new edition of the missal (the Missale Gothicum secundum regulam beati Isidori Hispalensis episcopi) that was completed and published at his expense in 1804, the year of his death. Due to his death and various political difficulties of the time, the Missale Gothicum did not reach the chapel in Toledo until around 1898, and even then only after much effort by the chaplains. Parts of the original 1804 edition were lost after 1936, only to be rediscovered in a cabinet in 1975.

Lorenzana's motivation was apparently to assert the Hispanic cultural heritage as encased in the Mozarabic liturgy, as well as to replace the then-antiquated Latin-Gothic typeset of the Cisneros edition. He was influenced in this endeavor by the scholarly edition of the Missale Mixtum published by Jesuit Alexander Lesley (1694–1758) in 1755, which both revealed grammatical and orthographic errors in the Latin and put the authenticity of some of the prayers therein into question. Using Lesley's work as a base, Lorenzana assigned Faustino Arévalo the task of re-editing the breviary and missal, using various texts and codices available in order to make corrections to the text, resulting in some of the material identified as Ortiz's original creations being relegated to an appendix. While Lorenzana's reforms were not extensive, the publication of new books facilitated an updated celebration of the liturgy in the Mozarabic Chapel and parishes.

=== Later history ===
In 1553, Pope Julius III regulated mixed marriages between Mozarabic and Roman Christians, with the ruling that children were to follow the rite of the father, but if the eldest daughter of a Mozarab married a Roman, she and her husband might choose which rite she and her children belong to, and if she became a widow she might return to the Mozarabic Rite had she left it at her marriage. This rule remained in force up until the early 20th century.

In 1570, Pope Pius V issued the bull Quo primum which made the use of the Tridentine form of the Roman liturgy obligatory throughout the Latin Church of the, except where a different liturgy had been in use for at least 200 years. As the Hispanic liturgy was already of considerable antiquity, it was counted as an exemption.

In 1842, all the Mozarabic parishes in Toledo except two (Santas Justa y Rufina and San Marcos) were suppressed, and their parishioners added to those of the two surviving parishes. In 1851, the chaplains of the Capilla Mozárabe were reduced from thirteen to eight, but the continuance of the above two parishes was provided for. Whereas the Hispanic liturgy was still practiced in these two parishes at the time, by the early 20th century, the only place where the rite was performed on a regular basis was in the Capilla Mozárabe in Toledo; even at the Capilla de Talavera in Salamanca, the rite was only celebrated once or twice a year.

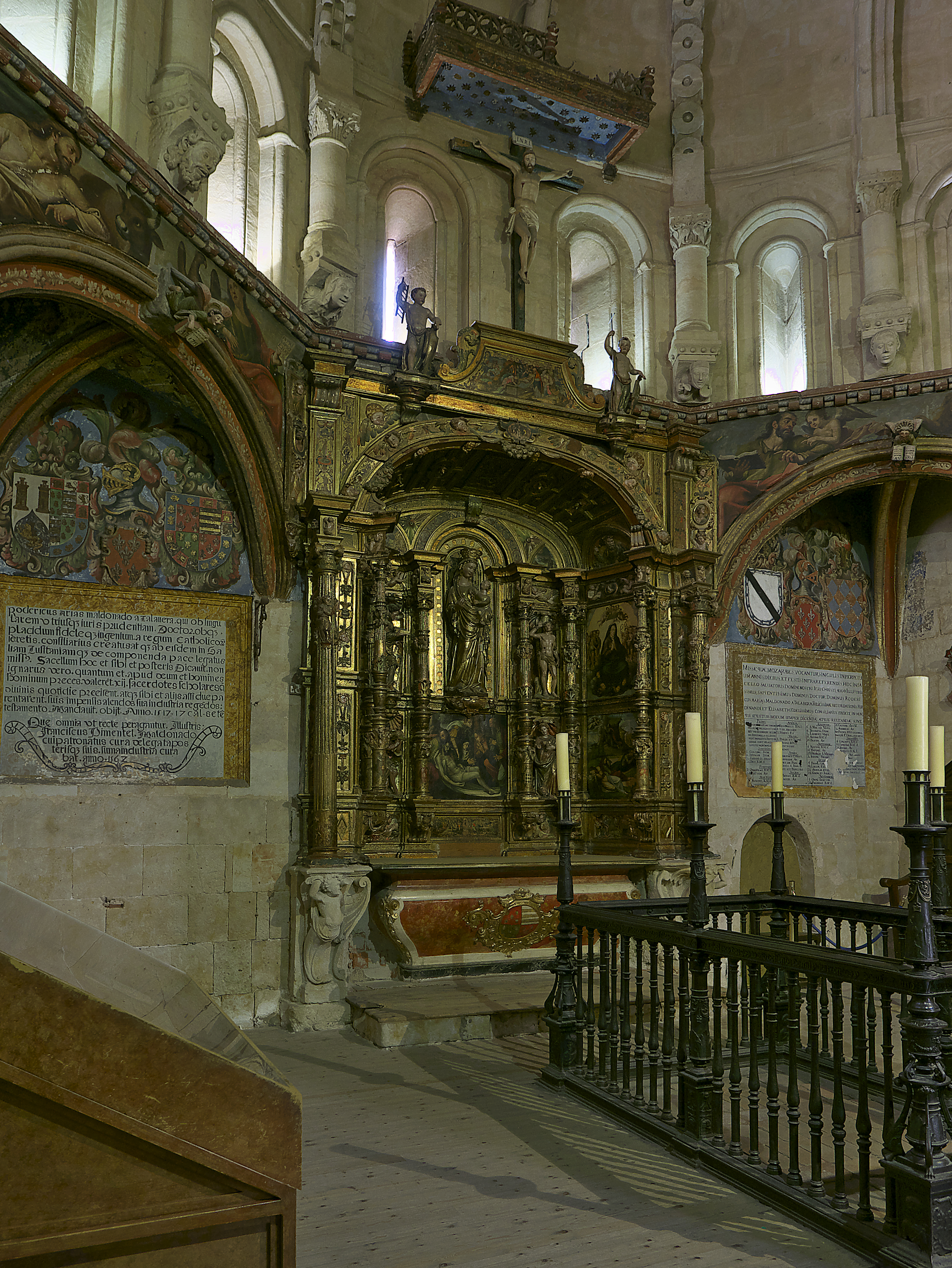
The Talavera Chapel in the Old Cathedral of Salamanca

The dawn of the 20th century saw an intensification of studies of the rite and the publication of its manuscript sources. In response to the encouragement given by the Second Vatican Council in Sacrosanctum Concilium to renew other rites as well as the Roman, the Cardinal-Archbishop of Toledo Marcelo González Martín set up a commission to revise liturgical books of the rite. Between 1988 and 1995, the two-volume Missale Hispano-Mozarabicum, followed by the lectionary (the Liber Commicus, also in two volumes) and a vernacular (Castilian) version of the Ordinary of the Mass appeared, with the required approval of the Spanish Episcopal Conference and confirmation by the Holy See. The revision consisted in eliminating extraneous elements and distortions which had been introduced in the 1500 edition and the integration of all the contributions of ancient sources from both Hispanic traditions. The new edition of Mozarabic liturgical books facilitated the occasional or relatively regular celebration of the rite.

==== Current status ====
The Hispano-Mozarabic Rite is still celebrated daily in the Capilla Mozárabe. Additionally, all the churches of Toledo annually celebrate this rite on the Mozarabic Feast of the Incarnation on 18 December, and on the feast day of Saint Ildefonsus of Toledo on 23 January. The two surviving Mozarabic parishes in the city now have about two hundred families in an association of those claiming historical observance of the rite. The rite is also used on certain days each year in the Capilla de Talavera in Salamanca, and every Tuesday at 19:00 in the Basílica de la Concepción de Nuestra Señora in Madrid.

Outside of Spain, the rite has also been celebrated in the Vatican four times to date. In October 1963, Mass according to the rite was celebrated in Saint Peter's Basilica during the Second Vatican Council in front of all participants. Pope John Paul II celebrated the Hispanic liturgy in May 1992 (the Feast of the Ascension) on occasion of the promulgation of the revised missal and Lectionary and again in December 2000, during the end of the Great Jubilee. The Mozarabic Mass was once again said in St. Peter's in 2015 by Archbishop of Toledo Braulio Rodríguez Plaza.

== Origins and connections to other rites ==
There is evidence that the Hispano-Mozarabic rite is tied to the Gallican family of rites, given common points of construction. Indeed, an anecdote about Charles the Bald relates that he had priests sent from Hispania so that he could experience the ancient Gallican liturgy and an edict of the Fourth Council of Toledo (633) prescribes a single order of worship for all of Iberia and Gaul.

While a connection with the Gallican liturgies is usually noted, there is no common agreement among scholars and authors regarding the exact origin of the Hispanic liturgy. Philip Schaff (1884) argues for an Eastern element in both Gallican and Hispanic rites, while Henry Jenner (1911) quotes Dom Marius Férotin O.S.B., who writes that the framework of the Hispanic liturgy is from Italy or Rome, while various details such as hymns are from Iberia, Africa, and Gaul. Jenner states that there is no extant concrete information about the Old Hispanic liturgy prior to the end of the 6th century, a point echoed by Fernand Cabrol (1932). Cabrol lists several liturgical points of Eastern origin (e.g. the place of the Diptychs, the Kiss of Peace, and the Epiclesis) while indicating liturgical commonalities to the entire West (including Rome and Gaul) and some customs which he believed antedate those of Rome. Archdale King, in a similar vein to Férotin's theory, postulated that the Gallican and Mozarabic liturgies are related to the Roman and may have developed from an "original" liturgy of Rome. Josef Jungmann, who rejected this idea, nevertheless acknowledged similarities among all three rites.

The more common theory at present sees Roman Africa as the origin of both Hispanic and Gallican rites, with influences from Italy and the East. Raúl Gómez-Ruiz (2014) expresses a more cautious view, noting that while the two liturgies may well share a common origin, "it is not clear what that root was." The Eastern elements in both rites are now often interpreted as witnessing to later popular liturgical migrations and borrowings rather than to some ancient genesis.

== Manuscript traditions ==
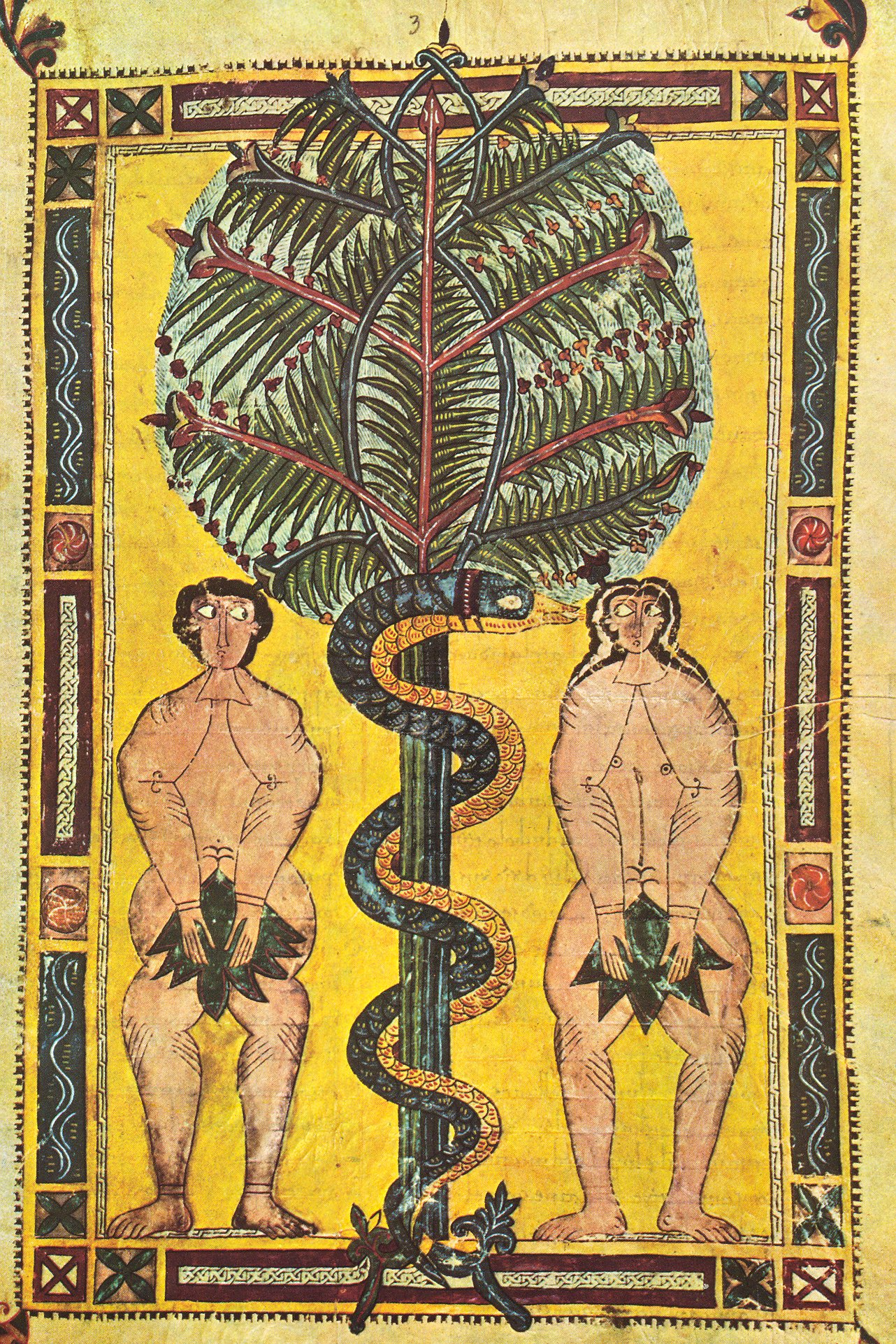
Adam and Eve (Escorial Beatus, 10th century)

Dom Jordi Pinell O.S.B. (d. 1997), the president of the commission charged with the revision of the rite's liturgical books in 1982, identified two distinct traditions represented in the ancient liturgical manuscripts of the Hispanic Rite: Tradition A, which is represented by the majority of the manuscripts and evinces the liturgical uniformity sought in the northern provinces of Tarraconensis and Carthaginensis, and the minority Tradition B, exemplified by manuscripts apparently conserved by Mozarab immigrants to Toledo from Seville (the metropolitan see of Baetica in the south). The two traditions, although having many common texts, do not often coincide in their order and distribution. In addition, they exhibit substantial differences in the structure and euchology of the Mass and Divine Office and feature different systems of biblical readings.

Pinell linked the manuscripts recopied in Toledo by the two parishes of Santa Eulalia and Santas Justa y Rufina to these two traditions. Scholars hold that three of the six Mozarabic parishes in the city – Santa Eulalia, San Lucas, and San Sebastián – were associated with Tradition A, which was (erroneously) identified in later tradition with Saint Leander of Seville, while the other three parishes – Santas Justa y Rufina, San Marcos, and San Torcuato – were associated with Tradition B, attributed to St. Isidore. He dated the Tradition A manuscripts of Santa Eulalia from the 8th to the 12th centuries, while the Tradition B codices linked with Santas Justa y Rufina were dated to the 10th to 12th centuries. Pinell speculated that the surviving texts (dated to the 14th–15th centuries) were copied from earlier manuscripts; for him, this late date implies that the liturgy was maintained with greater zeal in Santas Justa y Rufina, whereas all the other parishes had more or less abandoned their ancestral liturgy.

Of the two traditions, Tradition A is considered to be the more organized of the two, while Tradition B is less developed and combines evolution and corruption of the northern tradition. Pinell surmised that Tradition A was the indigenous Toledan liturgy, while Tradition B was imported by Mozarabs who immigrated to the city from southern Iberia in the 12th century, after the reconquest of Toledo.

Other scholars proposed other explanations regarding the manuscript traditions. For instance, contra Pinell's theory that Tradition B is from Seville, José Janini considered it to be a local Toledan usage. Anscari M. Mundó (1965) argued that all the manuscripts are much later and date at earliest from the 11th century. Hornby and Maloy (2013) cautions that due to the influx of refugees from Muslim Iberia to Toledo, "it cannot be automatically assumed that the surviving manuscripts are witnesses to a long tradition of Toledan practice. What is certain is that they represent Toledan Mozarabic practice after the reconquest." Also, while southern Christian immigration into Toledo would explain the practice of two distinct liturgical traditions there, the immigrants would not have all originated from the Seville region.

The reforms of Cardinal Cisneros in 1500 employed only Tradition B manuscripts for the compilation of the Missale Mixtum (and at least one of Tradition A that was similar in some ways to Tradition B). Similarly, Lorenzana's reform was based on Tradition B texts available to him. Texts from Tradition A came to light only as a result of scholarly research in the 19th century. Eventually, texts from both traditions were incorporated into the current Mozarabic missal.

== Features ==
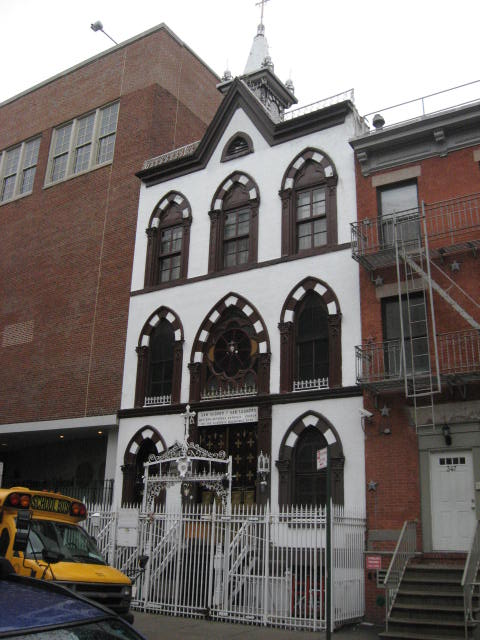
Saint Isidoro and Saint Leandro Church, Lower East Side, New York. It formerly belonged to the Orthodox Synod of Milan and used Mozarabic liturgy.

The Mozarabic liturgy is longer in duration than that of the Roman Rite. Imagery and ceremony are used extensively. The Breviary has a short and uncomplicated extra office (session of prayer) before the main morning office.

The Mozarabic Rite was the first to use ashes within the liturgical celebrations of the Church. Ashes were used prior to the Mozarabic Rite, but this was done outside of liturgical events, e.g., marking people for penance.

Extensive use is made of responsories between the celebrant (priest) and faithful during the Mozarabic Mass, including during the Confiteor (prayer of confession of guilt for sin), which is quite different from that in the Roman Rite.

Isidore of Seville in his writings made reference to the 'seven prayers' of the Mozarabic Mass. These are the seven major variable liturgical texts which constitute the essential prayer formulas said by the celebrant in the Mozarabic liturgy of the faithful, namely:

1. The Oratio Missae or Prayer of the Mass, (Note: This prayer and the two which follow it, as well as the eucharistic prayer itself has the characteristic double ending of the Mozarabic liturgical prayers, i. e., after the main body of the prayer is said the faithful respond "Amen" and the concluding clause is then said to which again the faithful respond "Amen".) an opening prayer making reference to the feast being celebrated and in general character much like the Roman Collect.
2. The Prayer after the Names, said immediately after the recitation of the names of the faithful, living and dead, who are being prayed for.
3. Prayer for Peace, said immediately before the kiss of peace.
4. The Illatio corresponding to the Roman Preface and most frequently the longest part of the Mozarabic Eucharistic prayer.
5. The Post-Sanctus, the part of the Mozarabic eucharistic prayer connecting the Sanctus with the institution narrative.
6. The Post-Pridie, the concluding portion of the eucharistic prayer including the anamnesis with its prayer of offering, the epiklesis, (when either or both of these are present) and the final doxology.
7. The Lord's Prayer, with its variable introduction and fixed embolism and concluding clause. (Note: The Lord's Prayer with its embolism and doxology conclude with a single "Amen", unlike most of the principal prayers of the priest in the Mozarabic rite.)

There was no fixed anaphora or Eucharistic prayer in the Mozarabic Rite of Mass, which permitted a fair degree of extemporaneous flexibility. When the Mozarabic Rite was given a new lease on life in 1500, the Roman Words of Institution (i.e., the key words that Jesus used at the Last Supper) were required. Originally, the Mozarabic Words of Institution were from Saint Paul's First Epistle to the Corinthians (11:24), with the formula for the Consecration of the wine being a combination of 1 Corinthians 11:25, Luke 22:20 and Matthew 26:28. These were the words written on the (old) Mozarabic Missal, though the Roman formula was included as a footnote in the Missal and was used in actual practice in place of the old Spanish formula (reinstituted in the modern Mozarabic Missal).

Some Eucharistic prayers are addressed to Christ (Note: For example, the famous Mozarabic Post-Sanctus petition: "Be present, be present, Jesus, the good high priest, in our midst as you were in the midst of your disciples and hal+low this oblation that we may take the things + sanctified by the hands of your holy angel, Holy Lord and everlasting Redeemer.") rather than to God the Father. After the consecration of the bread and wine (see Eucharist), as the Creed is being chanted, (Note: At least on Sundays and Feasts.) the host (the real presence of Christ under the species of bread) is broken into nine pieces, each representing a facet of Christ's life on earth, (Note: They are: 1. Incarnation, 2. Nativity, 3. Circumcision, 4. Epiphany, 5. Passion, 6. Death, 7. Resurrection, 8. Glory, and 9. Kingdom.) seven of which are arranged in a cross on the paten. After a variable introduction the Lord's Prayer was said by the celebrant alone, with everyone else responding "Amen" to each petition (except for the petition for daily bread, for which the response is "For you are God"), and everyone joining the celebrant for the final petition, "but deliver us from evil".

== Influence on other rites and churches ==
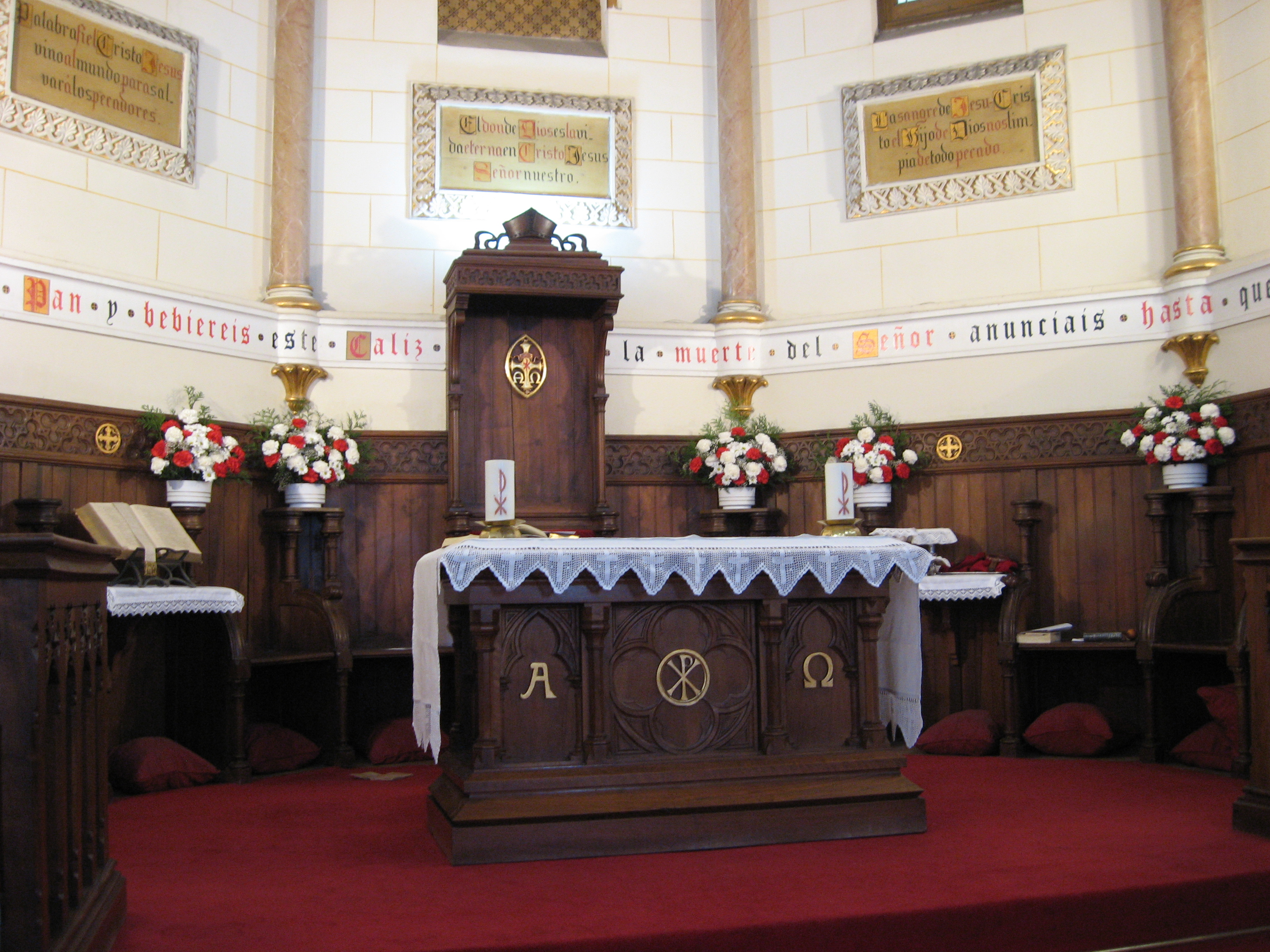
Interior of the Cathedral of the Redeemer in Madrid, the only cathedral of the Spanish Reformed Episcopal Church. The church uses a version of Mozarabic liturgy.

The Mozarabic Rite has been of interest to non-Catholic groups as well. For example, in the 1880s the Anglican Communion examined the Mozarabic Rite for ideas about making their own liturgy more inspiring. Presently, the Anglican Spanish Reformed Episcopal Church employs it for the celebration of all sacraments.

The Spanish custom of las arras, when the bridegroom gives his bride thirteen coins after exchanging vows, has its origins in the Mozarabic Rite. It is still practised in former Spanish colonies in Latin America and in the Philippines, as well as their ethnic Catholic parishes in the United States and Canada.

== See also ==
- Abbey of Santo Domingo de Silos
- Gallican Rite
- Mozarabic chant
- Missal of Silos
- Verona Orational

== Bibliography ==
- Castillo-Ferreira, Mercedes (2016). "Chant, Liturgy and Reform". In Knighton, Tess (ed.). Companion to Music in the Age of the Catholic Monarchs. Brill. ISBN 978-9004329324.
- Baumstark, Anton (2011). On the Historical Development of the Liturgy. Liturgical Press. ISBN 978-0814660966.
- Bosch, Lynette M. F. (2010). Art, Liturgy, and Legend in Renaissance Toledo: The Mendoza and the Iglesia Primada. Penn State Press. pp. 56–57. ISBN 9780271043814.
- Boynton, Susan (2011). Silent Music: Medieval Song and the Construction of History in Eighteenth-Century Spain. Oxford University Press. ISBN 978-0199754595.
- Burns, Paul C. (2013). "Mozarabic Rite". In Gerli, E. Michael (ed.). Medieval Iberia: An Encyclopedia. Routledge. pp. 588–590. ISBN 9781136771613.
- Chupungco, Anscar J., ed. (2016). Handbook for Liturgical Studies, Volume I: Introduction to the Liturgy. Liturgical Press. ISBN 9780814662861.
- Gómez-Ruiz, Raúl (2014). Mozarabs, Hispanics and Cross. Orbis Books. p. 36. ISBN 978-1608334018.
- Hornby, Emma; Maloy, Rebecca (2013). Music and Meaning in Old Hispanic Lenten Chants: Psalmi, Threni and the Easter Vigil Canticles. The Boydell Press. ISBN 978-1843838142.
- Jenner, Henry (1911). "Mozarabic Rite". Catholic Encyclopedia. New York: Robert Appleton Company.
- Knoebel, Thomas L. (2008). Isidore of Seville: De Ecclesiasticis Officiis. Paulist Press. ISBN 978-0809105816.
- Legg, John Wickham (1892). A Comparative Study of the Time in the Christian Liturgy at which the Elements are Prepared and Set on the Holy Table. S. Paul's Ecclesiological Society.
- Maloy, Rebecca (2010). Inside the Offertory: Aspects of Chronology and Transmission. Oxford University Press. ISBN 978-0195315172.
- Schaff, Philip (1884). "Chapter VII. Public Worship and Religious Customs and Ceremonies". History of the Christian Church Volume III: Nicene and Post-Nicene Christianity. A.D. 311-600.
- Spinks, Bryan D. (2013). Do this in Remembrance of Me: The Eucharist from the Early Church to the Present Day. SCM Press. ISBN 9780334043768.
