= Nostrum =

Nostrum may refer to:

- Nostrum remedium, a Latin term for trademarked patent medicine.
- Air Nostrum, a regional airline based in Spain.
- Exultavit cor nostrum, a 13th Century papal bull.
- Mare Nostrum, a Latin nickname for the Mediterranean sea.
- Pascha Nostrum, an Easter hymn.
- Nostrum Oil & Gas, an oil and gas exploration and production company.
