= Psalm 95 =

95th psalm of the book of psalms

- "O come, let us sing unto the LORD"
- Royal Psalm
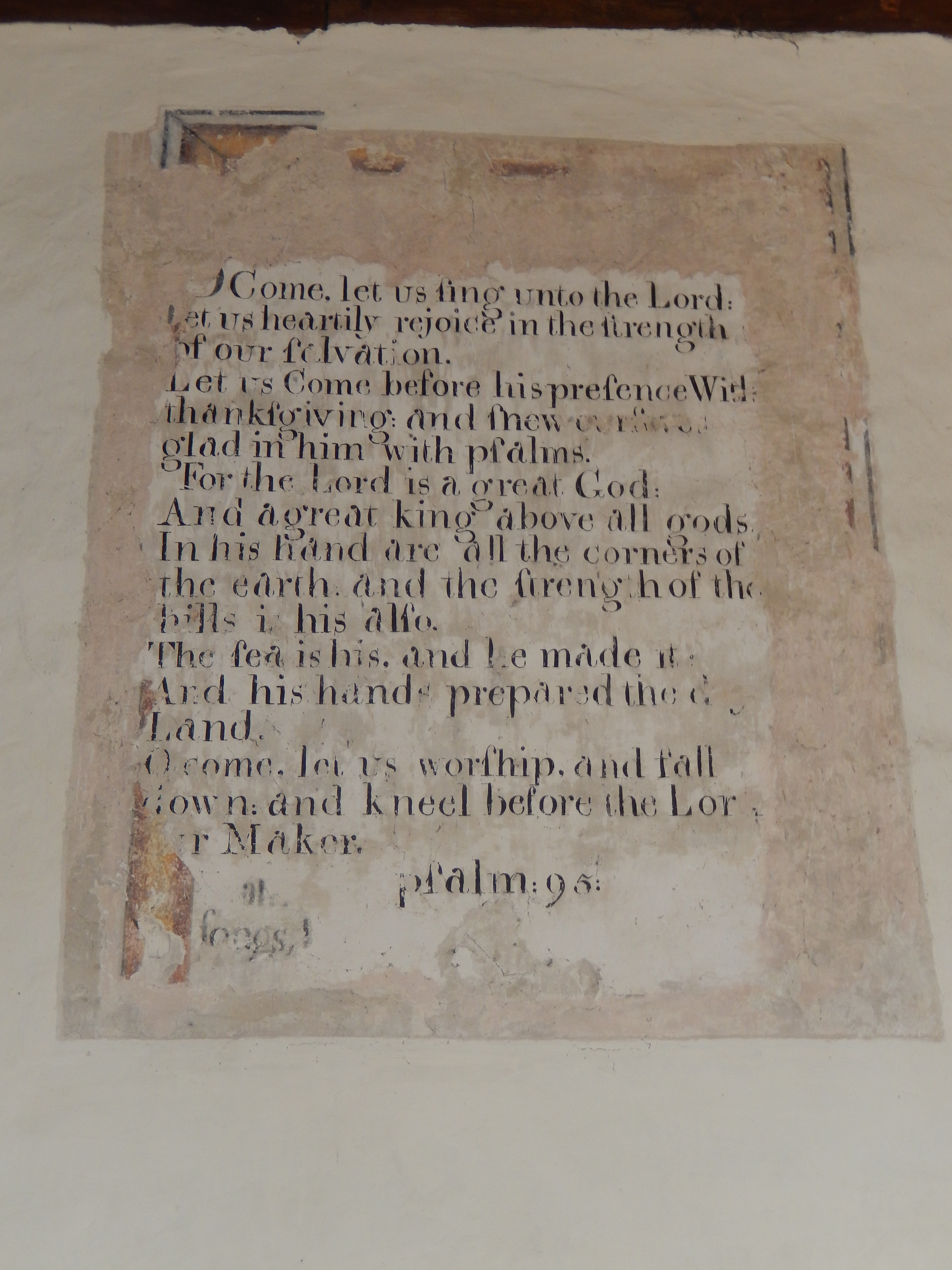
- Text of Psalm 95 at St James' Church, Bramley
- Other name: Psalm 94; "Venite exultemus"
- Language: Hebrew (original)

Psalm 95
- ← Psalm 94 Psalm 96 →
- Book: Book of Psalms
- Hebrew Bible part: Ketuvim
- Order in the Hebrew part: 1
- Category: Sifrei Emet
- Christian Bible part: Old Testament
- Order in the Christian part: 19

Psalm 95 is the 95th psalm of the Book of Psalms, beginning in English in the King James Version: "O come, let us sing unto the LORD: let us make a joyful noise to the rock of our salvation". The Book of Psalms starts the third section of the Hebrew Bible, and, as such, is a book of the Christian Old Testament. In the slightly different numbering system in the Greek Septuagint version of the Bible, and in the Latin Vulgate, this psalm is Psalm 94. In Latin, it is known as "Venite exultemus" or simply "Venite". The psalm is a hymn psalm, one of the Royal psalms, praising God as the King of His people. Psalm 95 identifies no author, but Hebrews 4:7 attributes it to David. The Vulgate also names David as the author.

The psalm forms a regular part of Jewish, Catholic, Lutheran, Anglican and other Protestant liturgies, in particular as the invitatory in daily liturgies. It has inspired hymns such as "Kommt herbei, singt dem Herrn", and has been set to music by Thomas Tallis, Heinrich Schütz and Felix Mendelssohn, among others.

== Uses ==
=== New Testament ===
Verses 7-11 of Psalm 95 are quoted in Hebrews 3:7–11, 15, 18; Hebrews 4:1, 3, 5, 7.

=== Judaism ===
Psalm 95 is the opening paragraph of Kabbalat Shabbat in Ashkenazic, Hasidic and some Sephardic communities. It is recited in some communities on Shabbat Hagadol. The first three verses are recited in most communities at the end of the psalm of the day for the Shir Shel Yom on Wednesday, which is primarily the previous psalm: this is the only day of the week in which the song of the day is composed on verses from multiple psalms, and the addition of these verses seems to be relatively late. These verses are added by some communities because of their inspiring message.

=== Christianity ===
In the Latin Psalters used by the Roman liturgy, the psalm forms the invitatory which is sung daily at the beginning of Matins or at the beginning of Lauds. It may be sung as a canticle in the Anglican and Lutheran liturgy of Morning Prayer, when it is referred to by its incipit as the Venite or "Venite exultemus Domino", sometimes also A Song of Triumph.

== Musical settings ==
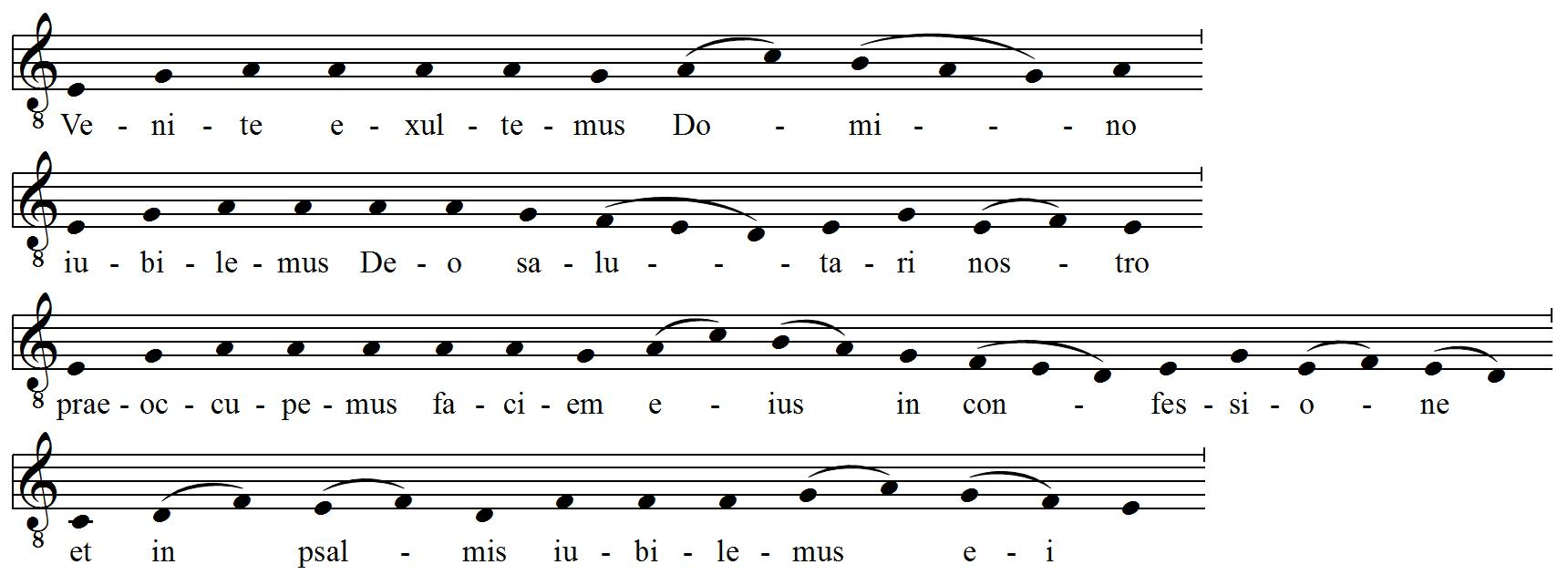
Invitatory of the 4th tone (transcribed from Worcester antiphonary, 13th century)

The Venite has been used as the invitatory, the opening psalm of daily liturgies, in both the Catholic Church and the Anglican Church. In Catholic rites, it used to start Nocturns in the Liturgy of the Hours. After the reforms of the liturgy following the Second Vatican Council, it was placed at before the Office of Readings or Lauds, whichever was said first in a liturgical day. In the Morning Prayer of the Anglican Church, the Venite used to open the service.

"Kommt herbei, singt dem Herrn" is a 1972 hymn in German, a paraphrase of Psalm 95 by Diethard Zils to an Israeli melody.

William Byrd set Psalm 95 as the Venite in his Great Service of around 1600. Thomas Tallis contributed a setting of the psalm as one of nine Tunes for Archbishop Parker's Psalter, a 1567 collection of vernacular psalm settings in a metrical psalter compiled and published for Matthew Parker, Archbishop of Canterbury. Heinrich Schütz set the psalm in a metred version in German as part of the Becker Psalter, first published in 1628, "Kommt herzu, laßt uns fröhlich sein", SWV 193. Jean-Joseph de Mondonville set one grand motet "Venite, exultemus" in 1743.

Felix Mendelssohn wrote a setting of the psalm in German, Kommt, laßt uns anbeten und knien von dem Herrn, Op. 46, for three soloists, choir and orchestra in 1842.

== Text ==
The following table shows the Hebrew text of the Psalm with vowels, alongside the Koine Greek text in the Septuagint and the English translation from the King James Version. Note that the meaning can slightly differ between these versions, as the Septuagint and the Masoretic Text come from different textual traditions. (Note: A 1917 translation directly from Hebrew to English by the Jewish Publication Society can be found here or here, and an 1844 translation directly from the Septuagint by L. C. L. Brenton can be found here. Both translations are in the public domain.) In the Septuagint, this psalm is numbered Psalm 94.

#	Hebrew	English	Greek
1	לְ֭כוּ נְרַנְּנָ֣ה לַיהֹוָ֑ה נָ֝רִ֗יעָה לְצ֣וּר יִשְׁעֵֽנוּ׃	O come, let us sing unto the LORD: let us make a joyful noise to the rock of our salvation.	Αἶνος ᾠδῆς τῷ Δαυΐδ. - ΔΕΥΤΕ ἀγαλλιασώμεθα τῷ Κυρίῳ, ἀλαλάξωμεν τῷ Θεῷ τῷ Σωτῆρι ἡμῶν·
2	נְקַדְּמָ֣ה פָנָ֣יו בְּתוֹדָ֑ה בִּ֝זְמִר֗וֹת נָרִ֥יעַֽ לֽוֹ׃	Let us come before his presence with thanksgiving, and make a joyful noise unto him with psalms.	προφθάσωμεν τὸ πρόσωπον αὐτοῦ ἐν ἐξομολογήσει καὶ ἐν ψαλμοῖς ἀλαλάξωμεν αὐτῷ.
3	כִּ֤י אֵ֣ל גָּד֣וֹל יְהֹוָ֑ה וּמֶ֥לֶךְ גָּ֝ד֗וֹל עַל־כׇּל־אֱלֹהִֽים׃	For the LORD is a great God, and a great King above all gods.	ὅτι Θεὸς μέγας Κύριος καὶ Βασιλεὺς μέγας ἐπὶ πᾶσαν τὴν γῆν·
4	אֲשֶׁ֣ר בְּ֭יָדוֹ מֶחְקְרֵי־אָ֑רֶץ וְתוֹעֲפֹ֖ת הָרִ֣ים לֽוֹ׃	In his hand are the deep places of the earth: the strength of the hills is his also.	ὅτι ἐν τῇ χειρὶ αὐτοῦ τὰ πέρατα τῆς γῆς, καὶ τὰ ὕψη τῶν ὀρέων αὐτοῦ εἰσιν·
5	אֲשֶׁר־ל֣וֹ הַ֭יָּם וְה֣וּא עָשָׂ֑הוּ וְ֝יַבֶּ֗שֶׁת יָדָ֥יו יָצָֽרוּ׃	The sea is his, and he made it: and his hands formed the dry land.	ὅτι αὐτοῦ ἐστιν ἡ θάλασσα, καὶ αὐτὸς ἐποίησεν αὐτήν, καὶ τὴν ξηρὰν αἱ χεῖρες αὐτοῦ ἔπλασαν.
6	בֹּ֭אוּ נִשְׁתַּחֲוֶ֣ה וְנִכְרָ֑עָה נִ֝בְרְכָ֗ה לִֽפְנֵי־יְהֹוָ֥ה עֹשֵֽׂנוּ׃	O come, let us worship and bow down: let us kneel before the LORD our maker.	δεῦτε προσκυνήσωμεν καὶ προσπέσωμεν αὐτῷ καὶ κλαύσωμεν ἐναντίον Κυρίου, τοῦ ποιήσαντος ἡμᾶς·
7	כִּ֘י ה֤וּא אֱלֹהֵ֗ינוּ וַאֲנַ֤חְנוּ עַ֣ם מַ֭רְעִיתוֹ וְצֹ֣אן יָד֑וֹ הַ֝יּ֗וֹם אִֽם־בְּקֹל֥וֹ תִשְׁמָֽעוּ׃	For he is our God; and we are the people of his pasture, and the sheep of his hand. To day if ye will hear his voice,	ὅτι αὐτός ἐστιν ὁ Θεὸς ἡμῶν, καὶ ἡμεῖς λαὸς νομῆς αὐτοῦ καὶ πρόβατα χειρὸς αὐτοῦ.
8	אַל־תַּקְשׁ֣וּ לְ֭בַבְכֶם כִּמְרִיבָ֑ה כְּי֥וֹם מַ֝סָּ֗ה בַּמִּדְבָּֽר׃	Harden not your heart, as in the provocation, and as in the day of temptation in the wilderness:	σήμερον, ἐὰν τῆς φωνῆς αὐτοῦ ἀκούσητε, μὴ σκληρύνητε τὰς καρδίας ὑμῶν, ὡς ἐν τῷ παραπικρασμῷ κατὰ τὴν ἡμέραν τοῦ πειρασμοῦ ἐν τῇ ἐρήμῳ,
9	אֲשֶׁ֣ר נִ֭סּוּנִי אֲבֽוֹתֵיכֶ֑ם בְּ֝חָנ֗וּנִי גַּם־רָא֥וּ פׇעֳלִֽי׃	When your fathers tempted me, proved me, and saw my work.	οὗ ἐπείρασάν με οἱ πατέρες ὑμῶν, ἐδοκίμασάν με καὶ εἶδον τὰ ἔργα μου.
10	אַרְבָּ֘עִ֤ים שָׁנָ֨ה ׀ אָ֘ק֤וּט בְּד֗וֹר וָאֹמַ֗ר עַ֤ם תֹּעֵ֣י לֵבָ֣ב הֵ֑ם וְ֝הֵ֗ם לֹא־יָדְע֥וּ דְרָכָֽי׃	Forty years long was I grieved with this generation, and said, It is a people that do err in their heart, and they have not known my ways:	τεσσαράκοντα ἔτη προσώχθισα τῇ γενεᾷ ἐκείνῃ καὶ εἶπα· ἀεὶ πλανῶνται τῇ καρδίᾳ, αὐτοὶ δὲ οὐκ ἔγνωσαν τὰς ὁδούς μου,
11	אֲשֶׁר־נִשְׁבַּ֥עְתִּי בְאַפִּ֑י אִם־יְ֝בֹא֗וּן אֶל־מְנוּחָתִֽי׃	Unto whom I sware in my wrath that they should not enter into my rest.	ὡς ὤμοσα ἐν τῇ ὀργῇ μου· εἰ εἰσελεύσονται εἰς τὴν κατάπαυσίν μου.
