= Pascha Nostrum =

Christian hymn

Pascha Nostrum, also known as the “Easter Anthems”, is a hymn used by some Christian communities during the Easter season. The title is Latin for "Our Passover," and the text is a cento formed from several verses of Scripture: 1 Corinthians 5:7–8, Romans 6:9–11, and 1 Corinthians 15:20–22.

Archbishop Thomas Cranmer compiled it to be used at Mattins (Morning Prayer) on Easter Day in place of the “Venite” (Psalm 95) in the Church of England's Book of Common Prayer. In Common Worship, it is an option for use on every day of the Easter season. It has been put to many different musical settings.

In the Episcopal Church, it may be used in the traditional translation of King James Version or in a contemporary version as the invitatory at every celebration of Morning Prayer during the fifty days of Easter.
