= Canticle =

Type of Christian song of praise

In the context of Christian liturgy, a canticle (/ˈkæntɪkəl/; from the Latin canticulum, a diminutive of canticum, "song") is a psalm-like song with biblical lyrics taken from elsewhere than the Book of Psalms, but included in psalters and books such as the breviary. Of special importance to the Divine Office are three New Testament Canticles that are the climaxes of the Offices of Lauds, Vespers and Compline; these are respectively Benedictus (Luke 1:68-79), Magnificat (Luke 1:46-55) and Nunc dimittis (Luke 2:29-32). There are also a number of Canticles taken from the Old Testament.

== Catholic Church ==
Prior to Pope Pius X's 1911 reforms, the following cycle of seven Old Testament Canticles was used at Lauds:

- Sunday – The Song of the Three Holy Children (Daniel 3:57–88, 56)
- Monday – The Song of Isaiah the Prophet (Isaiah 12:1–6)
- Tuesday – The Song of Hezekiah (Isaiah 38:10–20)
- Wednesday – The Song of Hannah (1 Samuel 2:1–10)
- Thursday – The (First) Song of Moses (Exodus 15:1–19)
- Friday – The Prayer of Habakkuk (Habakkuk 3:2–19)
- Saturday – The (Second) Song of Moses (Deuteronomy 32:1–43)

These are rather long, and the weekday ones display something of a penitential theme, but some were not often used, as all feasts and the weekdays in Eastertide had the Canticle of Daniel, assigned to Sunday.

The 1911 reform introduced for weekdays not of penitential nature, and for lesser feasts and days of the lesser octaves, the following Canticles:

- Monday – The Song of David the King (1 Chronicles 29:10–13)
- Tuesday – The Song of Tobit (Tobit 13:1–11)
- Wednesday – The Song of Judith (Judith 16:15–22)
- Thursday – The Song of Jeremiah the Prophet (Jeremiah 31:10–18)
- Friday – The (Second) Song of Isaiah the Prophet (Isaiah 45:15–30)
- Saturday – The Song of Ecclesiasticus (Sirach 36:1–16)

For weekdays in Advent, Pre-Lent, Lent and the quarterly Ember Days, if not superseded by higher-ranking feasts—due to the multitude of feasts in the rest of the year, these make up almost the totality of the days that did not have the Canticle of Daniel before—the original seven Canticles would still be used.

The Liturgy of the Hours (introduced in 1971) uses one canticle from the Old Testament each day at Lauds, "each weekday of the four-week cycle [has] its own proper canticle and on Sunday the two sections of the Canticle of the Three Children may be alternated". The liturgy prior to the reform after Vatican II used fourteen Old Testament Canticles in two weekly cycles.

At Vespers according to the Liturgy of the Hours, a Canticle from the New Testament is used. These follow a weekly cycle, with some exceptions.

Additionally, the following Canticles from the Gospel of Luke (also called the “Evangelical Canticles”) are said daily:

- At Lauds, the "Canticle of Zachary" (Luke 1:68-79), commonly referred to as the Benedictus.
- At Vespers, the "Canticle of Mary" (Luke 1:46-55), commonly known as the Magnificat.
- At Compline, the "Canticle of Simeon" (Luke 2:29-32), commonly referred to as the Nunc dimittis.

This usage is also followed by Lutheran churches.

== Anglican ==
In the Church of England, Morning and Evening Prayer according to the Book of Common Prayer make extensive use of canticles, specifically those below and also in some enumerations, the Venite (Psalm 95). Nonetheless, the only text called a canticle in the rubrics of the Book of Common Prayer is the Benedicite, while the Song of Solomon is called the Canticles in the Lectionary.

- At Morning Prayer:
  - Te Deum or Benedicite (Daniel 3:57–88 in the Apocrypha)
  - Benedictus (Luke 1:68–79) or Jubilate Deo (Psalm 100)
- At Evening Prayer:
  - Magnificat (Luke 1:46–55) or Cantate Domino (Psalm 98)
  - Nunc dimittis (Luke 2:29–32) or Deus misereatur (Psalm 67)

== Eastern Christian ==
In the Eastern Orthodox and Eastern Catholic Churches there are nine Biblical Canticles (or Odes) that are chanted at Matins. These form the basis of the Canon, a major component of Matins.

The nine Canticles are as follows:

- Canticle One — The (First) Song of Moses (Exodus 15:1–19)
- Canticle Two — The (Second) Song of Moses (Deuteronomy 32:1–43)
- Canticle Three — The Prayer of Hannah (1 Samuel 2:1–10)
- Canticle Four — The Prayer of Habakkuk (Habakkuk 3:1–19)
- Canticle Five — The Prayer of Isaiah (Isaiah 26:9–20)
- Canticle Six — The Prayer of Jonah (Jonah 2:2–9)
- Canticle Seven — The Prayer of the Three Holy Children (Daniel 3:26-56)
- Canticle Eight — The Song of the Three Holy Children (Daniel 3:57-88)
- Canticle Nine — The Song of the Theotokos (the Magnificat: Luke 1:46–55); the Song of Zacharias (the Benedictus Luke 1:68–79)

Originally, these Canticles were chanted in their entirety every day, with a short refrain inserted between each verse. Eventually, short verses (troparia) were composed to replace these refrains, a process traditionally inaugurated by Saint Andrew of Crete. Gradually over the centuries, the verses of the Biblical Canticles were omitted (except for the Magnificat) and only the composed troparia were read, linked to the original canticles by an Irmos. During Great Lent however, the original Biblical Canticles are still read.

Another Biblical Canticle, the Nunc Dimittis (Luke 2:29–32), is either read or sung at Vespers.

== Armenian Liturgy ==
At Matins (or Midnight Hour; Armenian: Ի մէջ Գիշերի i mej gisheri), one canticle from the Old Testament is sung, associated with a reading from the Psalter, followed by hymns according to tone, season, and feast. There are eight such canticles which are determined by the musical tone of the day. These are, along with their respective portions of the Psalter and their tones:

- Tone Eight — The (First) Song of Moses (Exodus 15:1–19)— Psalms 1-17
- Tone One — The (Second) Song of Moses (Deuteronomy 32:1–21) — Psalms 18-35
- Tone Two — The (Second) Song of Moses (Deuteronomy 32:22–28, Deuteronomy 32:39–43) — Psalms 36-54
- Tone Three — The Prayer of Hannah (1 Samuel 2:1–10) — Psalms 55-71
- Tone Four — The Prayer of Isaiah (Isaiah 26:9–20) — Psalms 72-88
- Tone Five — The Prayer of Hezekiah (Isaiah 38:10–20) — Psalms 89-105
- Tone Six — The Prayer of Jonah with material from Isaiah (Isaiah 42:10–13, Isaiah 45:6, Jonah 2:2–10) — Psalms 106-118
- Tone Seven — The Prayer of Habakkuk (Habakkuk 3:1–19) — Psalms 119-147

Note that Psalms 148-150 and Psalm 151 are not part of this system because they are read every day at the Morning Hour, following the canticles presented below.

At the Morning Hour (Armenian: Յառաւուտու Ժամ haṟavoutou zham), corresponding to Lauds, the following canticles are fixed parts of the service each day:

- The Prayer of the Three Holy Children (Daniel 3:26-88)
- The Song of the Theotokos (Magnificat: Luke 1:46–55);
- The Song of Zacharias (the Benedictus Luke 1:68–79)
- The Prayer of Simeon (Nunc dimittis Luke 2:29–32)

Following the Song of the Three Youths and the Prayer of Simeon there are sets of hymns as well as other texts which are proper to the commemoration of the day or of the liturgical season.

In the other hours, sections of these and other canticles are included in fixed material, consisting of amalgams of verse material from the Old Testament: Ninth Hour: a citation of Daniel 3:35; Peace Hour (after Vespers): Isaiah 8:9–10, Isaiah 9:26; Rest Hour (after the Peace Hour): Daniel 3:29-34, Luke 2:29-32, Luke 1:16-55.

This list does not take into account citations of these texts in the Divine Liturgy (Armenian: Պատարագ patarag) or in the movable Old Testament verse material or in hymnody.

== Coptic Orthodoxy ==
In the Coptic Orthodox Church there are four Biblical Canticles (or ϩⲱⲥ (hos, literally praise/song)) that are chanted during midnight praises. The fourth of these canticles is also chanted during vespers praises.

The four Canticles are as follows:

- The First Canticle - The Song of Moses (Exodus 15:1–21)
- The Second Canticle - Psalm 136 (135 LXX)
- The Third Canticle - The Song of the Three Holy Children (Daniel 3:52-88 LXX, including The Benedicite)
- The Fourth Canticle - Psalm 148–150

== See also ==
- Hymns to Mary
- A Canticle for Leibowitz
- Canticle, the counterpoint melody to "Scarborough Fair" by Simon & Garfunkel
