= Matins =

Major canonical hour of the liturgy

Carthusians process to Matins at 2 am

Matins (also Mattins) is one of the major canonical hours, originally sung during the darkness of early morning (between midnight and dawn).

The earliest use of the term was in reference to the canonical hour, also called the vigil, which was originally celebrated by monks or nuns from about two hours after midnight to, at latest, the dawn, the time for the canonical hour of Lauds (a practice still followed in certain orders). It was divided into two or (on Sundays and high feasts) three nocturns. Outside of monasteries, it was generally prayed at other times of the day, sometimes in conjunction with Lauds, sometimes anticipated, i. e. on the evening before, after compline.

== Liturgy ==
In the Liturgy of the Hours of the Latin Church, Matins is also called the "Office of Readings", which includes several psalms, a chapter of a book of Scripture (assigned according to the liturgical seasons), and a reading from the works of patristic authors or saints. In opposition to Matins, the Office of Readings could be prayed every time of the liturgical day.

In the Byzantine Rite, these vigils correspond to the aggregate comprising the Midnight office, orthros, and the first hour.

Lutherans preserve recognizably traditional Matins, distinct from the office of morning prayer.

In the Anglican Daily Office, Matins, occasionally spelled Mattins, combines the hours of Matins and Lauds as established by Benedict of Nursia in Roman Catholicism and observed in England until the Reformation, most grandly in the Use of Sarum. It is one of the two daily times for prayer, the other being Evensong, which combines St. Benedict's Vespers and Compline.

In Oriental Orthodox Christianity and Oriental Protestant Christianity, the office is prayed at 6 am, being known as Sapro in the Syriac and Indian traditions; it is prayed facing the eastward direction of prayer by all members in these denominations, both clergy and laity, being one of the seven fixed prayer times.

"Matins" is sometimes used in other Protestant denominations to describe any morning service.

== History ==
From the time of the early Church, the practice of seven fixed prayer times has been taught; in Apostolic Tradition, Hippolytus instructed Christians to pray seven times a day "on rising, at the lighting of the evening lamp, at bedtime, at midnight" and "the third, sixth and ninth hours of the day, being hours associated with Christ's Passion." With respect to praying in the early morning, Hippolytus wrote: "Likewise, at the hour of the cock-crow, rise and pray. Because at this hour, with the cock-crow, the children of Israel refused Christ, who we know through faith, hoping daily in the hope of eternal light in the resurrection of the dead."

== Catholic Church ==
=== Roman Rite ===
==== Vigil ====
The every-night monastic canonical hour that later became known as matins was at first called a vigil, from Latin vigilia. For soldiers, this word meant a three-hour period of being on the watch during the night. Even for civilians, night was commonly spoken of as divided into four such watches: the Gospels use the term when recounting how, at about "the fourth watch of the night", Jesus came to his disciples who in their boat were struggling to make headway against the wind, and one of the Psalms says to the Lord: "A thousand years in your sight are but as yesterday when it is past, or as a watch in the night."

The sixth-century Rule of Saint Benedict uses the term vigiliae ("Vigils") fifteen times to speak of these celebrations, accompanying it four times with the adjective nocturnae ("nocturnal") and once with the words septem noctium ("of the seven nights", i.e., the nights of the week).

English versions of this document often obscure its use of the term vigil, translating it as "Night Hour" or "Night Office". Thus Leonard J. Doyle's English version uses "Night Office" to represent indifferently the unaccompanied noun vigilia ("vigil"), the phrase nocturna vigilia ("nightly vigil"), and the phrases nocturna hora ("night hour) and nocturna laus ("nocturnal praise").

The practice of rising for prayer in the middle of the night is as old as the Church. Tertullian (c. 155 – c. 240) speaks of the "nocturnal convocations" (nocturnae convocationes) of Christians and their "absence all the night long at the paschal solemnities" (sollemnibus Paschae abnoctantes) Cyprian (c. 200 – 258) also speaks of praying at night, but not of doing so as a group: "Let there be no failure of prayers in the hours of night — no idle and reckless waste of the occasions of prayer" (nulla sint horis nocturnis precum damna, nulla orationum pigra et ignava dispendia). The Apostolic Tradition speaks of prayer at midnight and again at cockcrow, but seemingly as private, not communal, prayer. At an earlier date, Pliny the Younger reported in about 112 that Christians gathered on a certain day before light, sang hymns to Christ as to a god and shared a meal. The solemn celebration of vigils in the churches of Jerusalem in the early 380s is described in the Peregrinatio Aetheriae.

Prayer at midnight and at cockcrow was associated with passages in the Gospel of Matthew and the Gospel of Mark. On the basis of the Gospel of Luke, too, prayer at any time of the night was seen as having eschatological significance.

The quotation from Tertullian above refers to the all-night vigil liturgy held at Easter. A similar liturgy came to be held in the night that led to any Sunday. By the fourth century this Sunday vigil had become a daily observance, but no longer lasted throughout the night. What had been an all-night vigil became a liturgy only from cockcrow to before dawn. Saint Benedict wrote about it as beginning at about 2 in the morning ("the eighth hour of the night") and ending in winter well before dawn (leaving an interval in which the monks were to devote themselves to study or meditation), but having to be curtailed in summer in order to celebrate Lauds at daybreak.

==== Matins ====
The word matins is derived from the Latin adjective matutinus, meaning 'of or belonging to the morning'. It was at first applied to the psalms recited at dawn, but later became attached to the prayer originally offered, according to the fourth-century Apostolic Constitutions, at cockcrow and, according to the sixth-century Rule of Saint Benedict, at could be calculated to be the eighth hour of the night (the hour that began at about 2 a.m.).

Between the vigil office and the dawn office in the long winter nights there was an interval, which "should be spent in study by those [monks] who need a better knowledge of the Psalter or the lessons"; in the summer nights the interval was short, only enough for the monks to "go out for the necessities of nature". The vigil office was also shortened in the summer months by replacing readings with a passage of scripture recited by heart, but keeping the same number of psalms. Both in summer and in winter the vigil office was longer on Sunday than on other days, with more reading and the recitation of canticles in addition to the psalms.

Outside monasteries few rose at night to pray. The canonical hour of the vigil was said in the morning, followed immediately by Lauds, and the name of "Matins" became attached to the lengthier part of what was recited at that time of the day, while the name of "Lauds", a name originally describing only the three Psalms 148−150 recited every day at the end of the dawn office (until excised in the 1911 reform of the Roman Breviary by Pope Pius X; see Lauds), was applied to the whole of that office, substituting for the lost name of "Matins" or variants such as laudes matutinae ("morning praises") and matutini hymni ("morning hymns"). An early instance of the application of the named "Matins" to the vigil office is that of the Council of Tours in 567, which spoke of ad matutinum sex antiphonae.

The Rule of Saint Benedict clearly distinguished matins as the nighttime hour, to which he applied Psalm 118/119:62, "At midnight I rise to praise you, because of your righteous rules".

The word vigil also took on a different meaning: not only a prayerful night watch before a religious feast, but the day before a feast.

==== Monastic matins ====
The canonical hour began with the versicle "Lord, open our lips: And we shall praise your name" (the latter repeated three times) followed by Psalm 3 and Psalm 94/95 (the invitatory). The invitatory was to be recited slowly out of consideration for any late-arriving monk, since anyone appearing after its conclusion was punished by having to stand in a place apart. After this a hymn was sung.

Next came two sets of six psalms followed by readings. (Such sets would later be called nocturns.) The first set was of six psalms followed by three readings from the Old or New Testaments or from Church Fathers. Each reading was followed by a responsory. The second set of six psalms was followed by a passage from the Apostle Paul recited by heart and by some prayers. The Night Office then concluded with a versicle and a litany that began with Kyrie eleison.

Since summer nights are shorter, from Easter to October a single passage from the Old Testament, recited by heart, took the place of the three readings used during the rest of the year.

On Sundays, the office was longer, and therefore began a little earlier. Each set of six psalms was followed by four readings instead of three after the first set and a single recitation by heart after the second set. Then three canticles taken from Old Testament books other than the Psalms were recited, followed by four readings from the New Testament, the singing of the Te Deum, and a reading by the abbot from the Gospels, after which another hymn was sung.

==== Roman Breviary matins ====
In the Roman Breviary, use of which was made obligatory throughout the Latin Church (with exceptions for forms of the Liturgy of the Hours that could show they had been in continuous use for at least two hundred years) by Pope Pius V in 1568, matins and lauds were seen as a single canonical hour, with lauds as an appendage to matins.

Its matins began, as in the monastic matins, with versicles and the invitatory Psalm 94 (Psalm 95 in the Masoretic text) chanted or recited in the responsorial form, that is to say, by one or more cantors singing one verse, which the choir repeated as a response to the successive verses sung by the cantors. A hymn was then sung.

After that introduction, Sunday matins had three sections ("nocturns"), the first with 12 psalms and 3 very short scriptural readings; the second with 3 psalms and 3 equally short patristic readings; and the third with 3 psalms and 3 short extracts from a homily. Matins of feasts of double or semidouble rank had 3 nocturns, each with 3 psalms and 3 readings. On a feast of simple rank, a feria or a vigil day, matins had 12 psalms and 3 readings with no division into nocturns.

The psalms used at matins in the Roman Breviary from Sunday to Saturday were Psalms 1−108/109 in consecutive order, omitting a few that were reserved for other canonical hours: Psalms 4, 5, 21/22−25/26, 41/42, 50/51, 53/54, 62/63, 66/67, 89/90−92/93. The consecutive order was not observed for the invitatory psalms, recited every day, and in the matins of feasts.

Each reading was followed by a responsory, except the last one, when this was followed by the Te Deum.

==== 20th-century changes ====
Matins underwent profound changes in the 20th century. The first of these changes was the reform of the Roman Breviary by Pope Pius X in 1911, resulting in what Pope Paul VI called "a new Breviary". The reservation of Psalms 1-108/109 to matins and the consecutive order within that group were abandoned, and, apart from the invitatory psalm, which continued in its place at matins every day, no psalm was ordinarily repeated within the same week. To facilitate an even distribution among the days of the week, the longer psalms were divided into shorter portions, as only the very long Psalm 118/119 had been previously. Matins no longer had 18 psalms on Sundays, 12 on ordinary days and 9 on the more important feasts: on every day it had 9 psalms, either distributed among three nocturns or recited all together, maintaining the distinction between celebrations as three nocturns with nine readings (including Sundays) and those arranged as a single nocturn with only three readings.

In 1947, Pope Pius XII entrusted an examination of the whole question of the Breviary to a commission which conducted a worldwide consultation of the Catholic bishops. He authorized recitation of the psalms in a new Latin translation and in 1955 ordered a simplification of the rubrics.

In 1960, Pope John XXIII issued his Code of Rubrics, which assigned nine readings only to matins on first-class and second-class feasts, and therefore reduced the readings at Sunday matins to three.

The Second Vatican Council's Constitution on the Sacred Liturgy dealt in some detail with the Divine Office, requesting that "the hour known as Matins" should become an office with fewer psalms and longer readings, suitable for nocturnal praise in a communal setting and for use at any time of the day in other cases. Subsequently in 1970, Pope Paul VI published a revised form of the Liturgy of the Hours, in which the psalms were arranged in a four-week instead of a one-week cycle, but the variety of other texts was greatly increased, in particular the scriptural and patristic readings, while the hagiographical readings were purged of non-historical legendary content. Matins was then given the name of "Office of Readings" (Officium lectionis) and was declared appropriate for celebrating at any hour, while preserving its nocturnal character for those who wished to celebrate a vigil. For that purpose alternative hymns are provided and an appendix contains material, in particular canticles and readings from the Gospels, to facilitate celebration of a vigil. The Catholic Church has thus restored to the word vigil the meaning it had in early Christianity. Pope John XIII's Code of Rubrics still used the word vigil to mean the day before a feast, but recognized the quite different character of the Easter Vigil, which, "since it is not a liturgical day, is celebrated in its own way, as a night watch". The Roman liturgy now uses the term vigil either in this sense of "a night watch" or with regard to a Mass celebrated in the evening before a feast, not before the hour of First Vespers.

The psalmody of the Office of Readings consists of three psalms or portions of psalms, each with its own antiphon. These are followed by two extended readings with their responsories, the first from the Bible (but not from the Gospels), and the second being patristic, hagiographical, or magisterial. A Gospel reading may optionally be added, preceded by vigil canticles, in order to celebrate a vigil. These are given in an appendix of the book of the Liturgy of the Hours.

To those who find it seriously difficult, because of their advanced age or for reasons peculiar to them, to observe the revised Liturgy of the Hours, Pope Paul VI gave permission to keep using the previous Roman Breviary either in whole or in part. In 2007 Pope Benedict XVI allowed all clergy of the Latin Church to fulfil their canonical obligations by using the 1961 Roman Breviary issued under Pope John XXIII (but not earlier editions such as that of Pius X or Pius V). This is done by traditionalist Catholic communities, such as the Priestly Fraternity of St. Peter and the Institute of Christ the King Sovereign Priest.

=== Non-Roman Western Rites ===
In the office of the Church of Jerusalem, of which the pilgrim Ætheria gives us a description, the vigils on Sundays terminated with the solemn reading of the Gospel, in the Church of the Holy Sepulchre. This practice of reading the Gospel has been preserved in the Benedictine liturgy. In the Tridentine Roman Liturgy this custom, so ancient and so solemn, was no longer represented but by the Homily; but after the Second Vatican Council it has been restored for the celebration of vigils.

The Ambrosian Liturgy, better perhaps than any other, preserved traces of the great vigils or pannychides, with their complex and varied display of processions, psalmodies, etc. The same liturgy also preserved vigils of long psalmody. This nocturnal office adapted itself at a later period to a more modern form, approaching more and more closely to the Roman liturgy. Here too were found the three nocturns, with Antiphon, psalms, lessons, and responses, the ordinary elements of the Roman matins, and with a few special features quite Ambrosian.

As revised after the Second Vatican Council, the Ambrosian liturgy of the hours uses for what once called matins either the designation "the part of matins that precedes Lauds in the strict sense" or simply Office of Readings. Its structure is similar to that of the Roman Liturgy of the Hours, with variations such as having on Sundays three canticles, on Saturdays a canticle and two psalms, in place of the three psalms of the other days in the Ambrosian Rite and of every day in the Roman Rite.

In the Mozarabic liturgy, on the contrary, Matins is a system of antiphons, collects, and versicles which make them quite a departure from the Roman system.

== Eastern Christianity ==
=== Byzantine Rite ===
In the Eastern Churches, matins is called orthros in Greek (ὄρθρος, meaning "early dawn" or "daybreak") and Oútrenya in Slavonic (Оўтреня). It is the last of the four night offices, which also include vespers, compline, and midnight office. In traditional monasteries it is celebrated daily so as to end at sunrise. In parishes it is normally served only on Sundays and feast days.

Matins is the longest and most complex of the daily cycle of liturgies. The akolouth (fixed portion of the liturgy) is composed primarily of psalms and litanies. The sequences (variable parts) of matins are composed primarily of hymns and canons from the Octoechos (an eight-tone cycle of hymns for each day of the week, covering eight weeks), and from the Menaion (hymns for each calendar day of the year).

Matins opens with what is called the "Royal Beginning", so called because the psalms (19 and 20) are attributed to King David and speak of the Messiah, the "king of kings"; in former times, the ektenia (litany) also mentioned the emperor by name. The Sunday orthros is the longest of the regular orthros liturgies. If celebrated in its entirety it can last up to three hours.

== Oriental Christianity ==
=== Syriac Orthodox Church, Indian Orthodox Church and Mar Thoma Syrian Church ===
In the Syriac Orthodox Church and Indian Orthodox Church (both of which are Oriental Orthodox Churches), as well as the Mar Thoma Syrian Church (an Oriental Protestant denomination), the Midnight Office is known as Sapro and is prayed at 6 am using the Shehimo breviary.

=== Armenian Rite ===
In the Armenian liturgy of the hours, Matins is known as the Midnight Office (Armenian: ի մեջ գիշերի ""i mej gisheri""). The Armenian Book of Hours, or Zhamagirk` (Armenian: Ժամագիրք) states that the Midnight Office is celebrated in commemoration of God the Father.

Much of the liturgy consists of the kanon (Armenian: Կանոնագլուխ ""kanonagloukh""), consisting of a sequence of psalms, hymns, prayers, and in some instances readings from the Gospels, varying according to tone of the day, feast, or liturgical season. The Armenian kanon is quite different in form from the canon of the Byzantine matins liturgy, though both likely share a common ancestor in the pre-dawn worship of the Jerusalem liturgy.

==== Basic outline of Matins in the Armenian Church ====
Introduction (common to all liturgical hours): "Blessed is our Lord Jesus Christ. Amen. Our father...Amen."

Fixed Preface

“Lord, if you open my lips, my mouth shall declare your praise.” (twice)

Acclamation: “Blessed is the consubstantial, unitary, and undivided Holy Trinity...Amen.

Psalms, Hebrew numbering in parentheses: 3, 88 (87), 103 (102), 143 (142)

“Glory to the Father...now and always...Amen”

Hymn of the Night Liturgy by Nerses Shnorhali: “Let us remember your name in the night, Lord...”

Proclamation by John Mandakuni “Having all been awakened in the night from the repose of sleep...”

“Lord, have mercy” (variable number of times: thrice for Sundays and feasts of Christ, 50 times for the feasts of saints, 100 times on days of fasting)

Hymn of Nerses Shnorhali: “All the world... (Ashkharh amenayn)”

“Lord, have mercy” (thrice). “Through the intercession of the Birthgiver of God: Remember, Lord, and have mercy.”

Hymn of Nerses Shnorhali: “The rising of the sun... (Aṛawowt lowsoy)”

Prayer: “We thank you...”

Blessed is our Lord Jesus Christ. Amen. Alleluia, alleluia.

At this point a section of the Psalter is read, followed by a canticle from the Old or New Testament. See Armenian Liturgy. Following the Psalms and the Canticle is the Canon, a complex sequence of psalms, hymns, and prayers which varies in part according to the liturgical calendar.

Conclusion: "Our father...Amen."

The Armenian Matins or Midnight Office bears some resemblance with the Midnight office of the Byzantine Rite, such as the recitation of a movable set of hymns depending on the feast. However, the Armenian Midnight Office is generally more elaborate than the Byzantine Midnight Office, in that the Armenian counterpart includes readings from the Gospel, as well as cycles of psalms and prayers reflecting the liturgical season or feast. Other material in the Byzantine office of Matins which has a counterpart in the Armenian daily office, such as the recitation of large sections of the Psalter and the recitation of biblical canticles, occurs in the Armenian liturgy at the Sunrise Hour which follows Matins, corresponding to Lauds.

== See also ==
- Matins in Lutheranism
- Anglican Morning Prayers
