= Reform of the Roman Breviary by Pope Pius X =

1911 Catholic reform

The reform of the Roman Breviary by Pope Pius X was promulgated by that Pope with the apostolic constitution Divino afflatu of 1 November 1911.

The Roman Breviary is the title of the book obligatorily used for celebrating the Roman Rite Divine Office from the revision of Pope Pius V (apostolic constitution Quod a nobis, 9 July 1568) to that by Pope Paul VI (apostolic constitution Laudis canticum, 1 November 1970).

== Changes ==
A minor matter was the printing in a separate section, called the Ordinary, of those parts of the Psalter that were to be recited frequently, perhaps several times in the same day, such as the invitatory, hymns for the seasons, blessings, absolutions, chapters, suffrages, the Lord's Prayer, Benedictus, Magnificat, Te Deum, etc.

Much more radical was a completely new arrangement of the psalms, distributing them or, when too long, dividing them so as to have approximately the same number of verses in each day's office. The lengths of the offices of the Breviary were reduced. For example, Matins went from 18 psalms recited on Sundays and 12 on ferial days, to 9 psalms or parts of psalms, never more, with the result of reaching a fairly equal number of verses for each day—between 360 and 497—whereas the former office of Saturday contained 792, and that of Sunday, 721).

This change, made with a view to restoring the original use of the liturgy, which provided for the chant or recitation of the entire Psalter each week, and the accompanying changes in the rubrics concerning the precedence between saints' days and the Sunday and ferial offices was meant to remedy the situation whereby the multiplication of saints' days had made celebration of Sundays and ferias, and consequently of certain psalms, very rare.

With the reform, the Psalter was once again recited integrally each week without suppressing the feasts of saints; the proper liturgy of Sundays and weekdays was restored; the readings of Holy Scripture proper to the seasons of the year were privileged.

Each day, therefore, had its own psalms, as arranged in the new Psalter, except certain feast days, about 125 in number, viz., all those of Christ and their octaves, the Sundays within the octaves of the Nativity, Epiphany, Ascension, Corpus Christi, the vigil of the Epiphany, and the day after the octave of the Ascension, when the office is of these days; the Vigil of the Nativity from Lauds to None and the Vigil of Pentecost; all the feasts of the Blessed Virgin, of the Angels, St. John the Baptist, St. Joseph, and the Apostles, as well as doubles of the first and second class and their entire octaves. The office for the last three days of Holy Week remained unchanged, except that the psalms for Lauds were from the corresponding days of the week in the Psalter, and for Compline those of Sunday. For all other feasts and for ferias in Eastertide the psalms were those of the new Psalter, while the rest of the office was from the Proper or Common. When a feast has special antiphons for any of the major hours, it retained them with its own psalms. Except for certain feasts, the lessons of the first nocturn were to be the current lessons from Scripture, though the responsories were to be taken from the Common or Proper. Any feast that had its own proper lessons retained them; for feasts with their own responsories, those with the common lessons were to be read.

Pope Pius X ordered that these changes, proposed by a committee of liturgists appointed by him, and adopted by the Congregation of Rites, be put into effect, at latest, on 1 January 1913.

One of the most important changes, immediately visible to those who do not pray the Divine Office, was the ranking of Sundays: whereas ordinary Sundays previously had given way to all feasts of the rank of "double", of which there were roughly two hundred in the general calendar alone (among others, virtually every bishop or monastic saint of the 2nd millennium that had a feast at all had a double feast), they would in the future have precedence over them except for feasts of the first and second class and of the Lord, of which there were considerably fewer (marking the time when the liturgical color of green became the usual color rather than a rare exception). In addition, by the motu proprio Abhinc duos annos of 23 October 1913, Pope Pius X added to his reform of 1 November 1911: no feast was to be fixed permanently to a Sunday except the Holy Name of Jesus and the Blessed Trinity (later, the feasts of the Holy Family and of Christ the King would be added). The Sunday office would only be superseded by sufficiently high-ranking feasts that happened to occur on their dates. The octaves were equally simplified.

These changes made it necessary to modify the Roman Missal also. This was effected in the 1920 typical edition of the Missal promulgated by Pius X's successor, Pope Benedict XV.

== Psalter of Pope Pius V abolished ==
Through the apostolic constitution Divino afflatu, by which Pope Pius X promulgated his revision of the Roman Breviary, he abolished the Psalter established by his predecessor Pope Pius V and forbade its use, declaring that those who were obliged to recite the Divine Office every day failed to fulfill this grave duty unless they used the new arrangement.

The wording of Pius X's apostolic constitution echoed closely that of Pius V's Quod a nobis, promulgating the Tridentine Roman Breviary, and also Pius V's Quo primum, promulgating the Tridentine Roman Missal. It included the paragraph:

This we publish, declare, sanction, decreeing that these our letters always are and shall be valid and effective, notwithstanding apostolic constitutions and ordinances, general and special, and everything else whatsoever to the contrary. Wherefore, let nobody infringe or temerariously oppose this page of our abolition, revocation, permission, ordinance, precept, statue, indult, mandate and will. But if anybody shall presume to attempt this let him know that he will incur the indignation of almighty God and of his apostles the blessed Peter and Paul.

To correspond to the new psalms, the antiphonary of the traditional Roman Office was also almost completely overhauled. Pre-1911, there were 141 unique antiphons in the psalter. Post-1911, there were 220. Only 66 antiphons were recognizably the same, and some 16 of these added words or removed them. Many of the overlapping ones were those for the special seasons (Advent, Lent, Passiontide), not for the per annum ferias. Thus 75 antiphons of the pre-1911 Breviary were removed, and 154 unique to the post-1911 Breviary introduced.

Of the 75 unique to the pre-1911 Breviary, 3 paschal antiphons were suppressed, 10 were suppressed because they were associated with repeating psalms at Lauds that no longer occurred multiple times during the week in the Pius X schema, 10 were suppressed because their psalms were moved to the Little Hours under a single antiphon not requiring an antiphon of their own, 5 were replaced at the Little Hours by a new antiphon from that psalm (but drawn from a different division of the psalm), and 47 were completely replaced by another quote from the same psalm/division.

== See also ==
- Liturgy of the Hours
- Roman Breviary
- Divine Office (disambiguation)
