= Daily Office (Anglican) =

Canonical hour prayers within Anglicanism

The Daily Office in Anglican churches refers to the traditional canonical hours of daily services, including Morning Prayer (also called Matins, especially when chanted) and Evening Prayer (called Evensong, especially when celebrated chorally). These services usually follow the Book of Common Prayer. As in other Christian traditions, either clergy or laity can lead the daily office. Most Anglican clergy are required to pray Morning and Evening Prayer daily.

== History ==
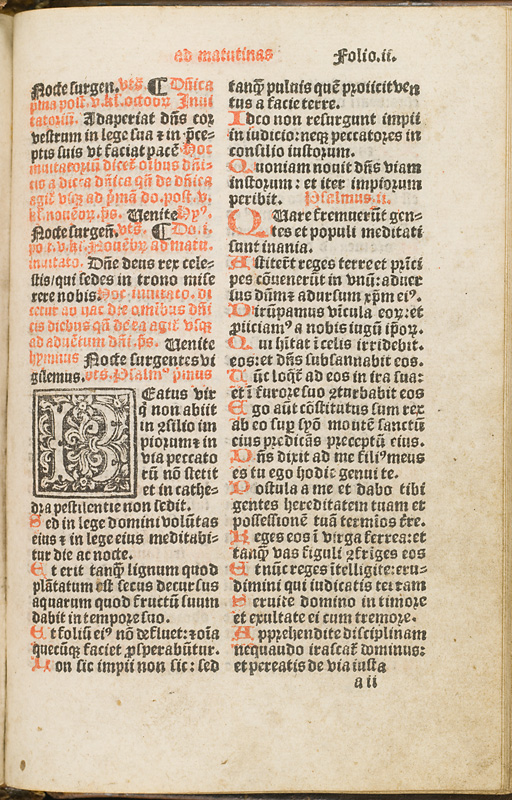
One of the first pages of the psalter in a service book used for the canonical hours before the Reformation, showing the beginning of Matins on Sunday. Shown is the direction to sing Venite and Psalms 1 and 2.

The Anglican practice of saying daily morning and evening prayer derives from the pre-Reformation canonical hours, of which eight were required to be said in churches and by clergy daily: Matins, Lauds, Prime, Terce, Sext, None, Vespers, and Compline. This practice derived from the earliest centuries of Christianity, and ultimately from the pre-Christian Jewish practice of reciting the Shema prayer in the morning and evening as well as a remembrance of the daily sacrifices in the Temple.

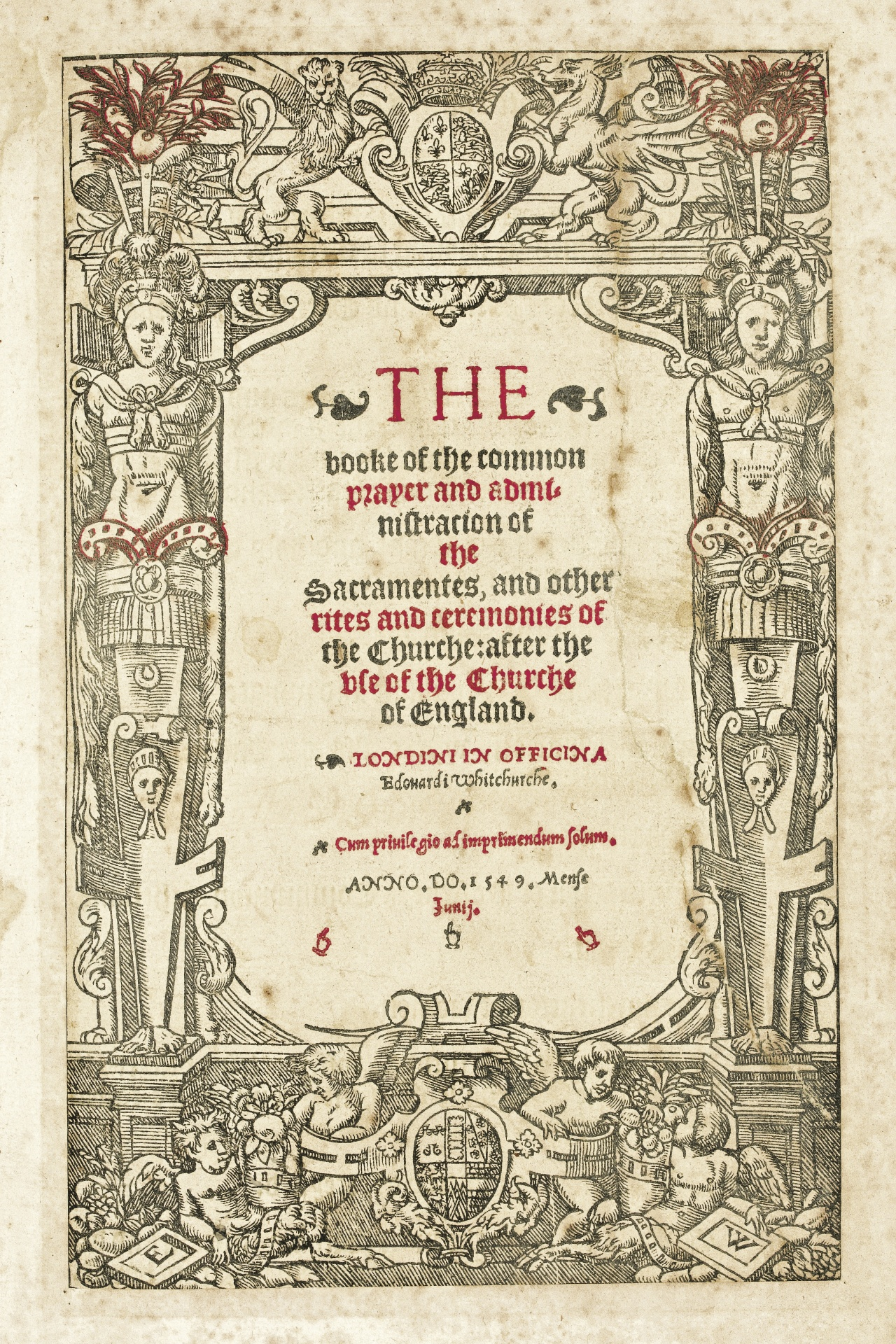
The first Book of Common Prayer (1549), which first presented the modern Anglican Daily Office services in essentially the same form as present.

The first Book of Common Prayer of 1549 radically simplified this arrangement, combining the first three services of the day into a single service called Mattins and the latter two into a single service called Evensong (which, before the Reformation, was the English name for Vespers). The rest were abolished. The second edition of the Book of Common Prayer (1552) renamed these services to Morning Prayer and Evening Prayer, respectively, and also made some minor alterations, setting the pattern of daily Anglican worship which has been essentially unchanged in most cathedrals and other large churches ever since, continuing to the current edition of the Church of England's 1662 Book of Common Prayer.

In most Anglican provinces, ordained ministers are required to say Morning and Evening Prayer daily; devout lay Anglicans also often make this a part of their spiritual practice. Historically, Anglican religious communities have made the Daily Office a central part of their communal spiritual life, beginning with the Little Gidding community of the 17th century. Regular use of Morning and Evening Prayer from the Book of Common Prayer was also a part of the "method" promoted by John Wesley and the early Methodist movement.

Since the Oxford (Tractarian) and ritualist movements of the 19th century, interest in the pre-Reformation practice of praying the office eight times a day has revived. Before his conversion to Roman Catholicism, the Tractarian priest John Henry Newman wrote in Tracts for the Times number 75 of the Roman Breviary's relation to the Church of England's daily prayer practices, encouraging its adoption by Anglican priests. The praying of "little hours", especially Compline but also a mid-day prayer office sometimes called Diurnum, in addition to the major services of Morning and Evening Prayer, has become particularly common, and is provided for by the current service books of the Episcopal Church in the United States and the Church of England.

== Liturgical practice ==
Traditional Anglican worship of the Daily Office follows the patterns first set down in 1549 and 1552. Since the 20th-century liturgical movement, however, some Anglican churches have introduced new forms which are not based on this historic practice. This section will describe the traditional form, which is still widely used throughout the Anglican Communion.

The Book of Common Prayer has been described as "the Bible re-arranged for public worship": the core of the Anglican Daily Office services is almost entirely based on praying using the words of the Bible itself, and hearing readings from it.

=== Confession and absolution ===
According to the traditional editions of the Book of Common Prayer since 1552, both Morning and Evening Prayer open with a lengthy prayer of confession and absolution, but many Anglican provinces including the Church of England and the American Episcopal Church now no longer require this even at services according to the traditional forms.

=== Opening responses ===
The traditional forms open with opening responses said between the officiating minister and the people, which are usually the same at every service throughout the year, taken from the pre-Reformation use: "O Lord, open thou our lips; and our mouth shall show forth thy praise", based on Psalm 51 and translated from the prayer which opens Matins in the Roman Breviary. Then follows "O God, make speed to save us" with the response "O Lord, make haste to help us", a loose translation of the Deus, in adjutorium meum intende which begins every service in the pre-Reformation hours, followed by the Gloria Patri in English.

=== Psalms and canticles ===
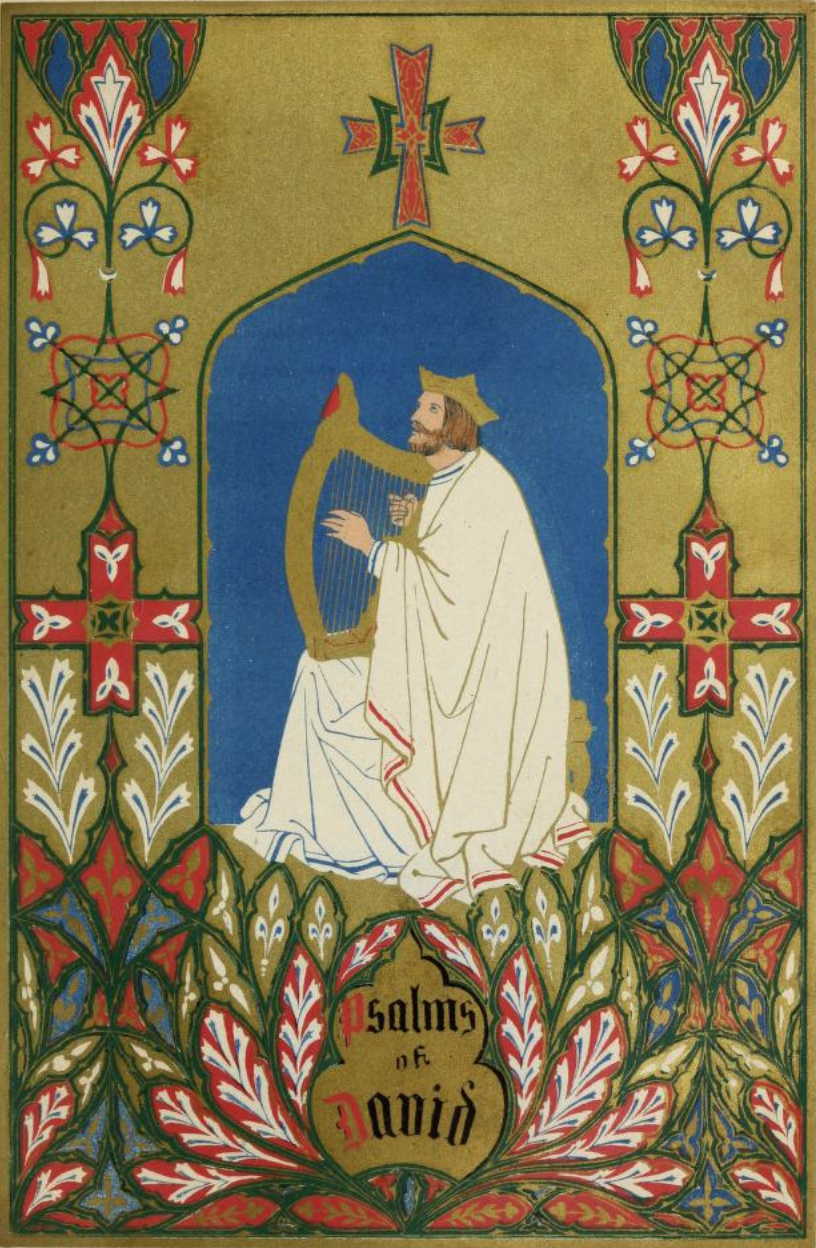
"Psalms of David", illustration by Owen Jones from the 1845 illuminated Book of Common Prayer.

A major aspect of the Daily Office before the Reformation was the saying or singing of the Psalms, and this was maintained in the reformed offices of Morning and Evening Prayer. Whereas for hundreds of years the church recited the entire psalter on a weekly basis (see the article on Latin psalters), the traditional Book of Common Prayer foresees the whole psalter said over the longer time period of one month; more recently, some Anglican churches have adopted even longer cycles of seven weeks or two months.

At Morning Prayer, the first psalm said every day is Venite, exultemus Domino, Psalm 95, either in its entirety or with a shortened or altered ending. During Easter, the Easter Anthems typically replace it; other recent prayer books, following the example of the Roman Catholic Liturgy of the Hours as revised following the Vatican II council, allow other psalms such as Psalm 100 to be used instead of the classical Venite. After the Venite or its equivalent is completed, the rest of the psalms follow, but in some churches an office hymn is sung first.

After each of the lessons from the Bible, a canticle or hymn is sung. At Morning Prayer, these are usually the hymn Te Deum laudamus, which was sung at the end of Matins on feast days before the Reformation, and the canticle Benedictus from the Gospel of Luke, which was sung every day at Lauds. As alternatives, the Benedicite from the Greek version of the Book of Daniel is provided instead of Te Deum, and Psalm 100 (under the title of its Latin incipit Jubilate Deo) instead of Benedictus. The combination of Te Deum and Jubilate has proven particularly popular for church music composers, having been set twice by Handel, as well as by Herbert Howells and Henry Purcell.

At Evening Prayer, two other canticles from the Gospel of Luke are usually used: Magnificat and Nunc dimittis, coming respectively from the services of Vespers and Compline. Psalms 98 and 67 are appointed as alternatives, but they are rarely used in comparison to the alternatives provided for Morning Prayer.

=== Bible readings ===
The introduction to the first Book of Common Prayer explained that the purpose of the reformed office was to restore what it described as the practice of the Early Church of reading the whole Bible through once per year, a practice it praised as "godly and decent". Its authors criticized what was perceived as the corruption of this practice by the mediaeval breviaries, where only a small portion of the scripture was read each year, with most books of the Bible being only read in their first few chapters, and the rest omitted.

While scholars now dispute that this was the practice or intention of the Early Church in praying their hours of prayer, the reading of the Bible remains an important part of the Anglican daily prayer practice. Typically, at each of the services of morning and evening prayer, two readings are made: one from the Old Testament or from the Apocrypha, and one from the New Testament. These are taken from one of a number of lectionaries depending on the Anglican province and prayer book in question, providing a structured plan for reading the Bible through each year.

=== Apostles' Creed ===
The Apostles' Creed, or Credo, is said congregationally following the readings and canticles.

=== Preces, or Suffrages ===
These are petitionary versicles and responses, in the following sequence:

- (a) the opening: ℣ "The Lord be with you"; ℟ "And with thy spirit"; ℣ "Let us pray"
- (b) the Kyrie eleison, in English
- (c) the Lord's Prayer, said or sung
- (d) the main responses (cf. the service's opening or final responses)
- (e) the collects: the first is usually a collect of the day, appropriate to the church season; the second and third are taken (at Morning Prayer) from the pre-Reformation orders for Lauds and Prime or (at Evening Prayer) from Vespers and Compline.

The versicles and responses follow an ancient pattern, other prayers follow including prayers for the civil authorities, for the ministers of the church and all its people, for peace, and for purity of heart. (Note: In modern use the term 'preces' is often used to refer to the opening responses, and 'responses' the part of the service after the creed, due to a misunderstanding of the name Preces and Responses, a common title for choral settings of both of these parts of the service. The historical usage of the term in liturgics, however, is to refer to the part of the service nearer the end. "preces". Oxford English Dictionary (online ed.). Oxford University Press. March 2007. (Subscription or participating institution membership required.)) The pattern is similar to that which opens the service.

=== Anthem ===
The rubric of the Book of Common Prayer of 1662 then reads 'In Quires and Places where they sing here followeth the Anthem.' At choral services of Mattins and Evensong, the choir at this point sings a different piece of religious music, which is freely chosen by the minister and choir. This usage is based on the pre-Reformation practice of singing a Marian antiphon after Compline, and was encouraged after the Reformation by the directions of Queen Elizabeth I's 1559 directions that 'for the comforting of such that delight in music, it may be permitted, that in the beginning, or in the end of common prayers, either at morning or evening, there may be sung an hymn, or suchlike song to the praise of Almighty God'.

=== Closing ===
In the 1662 Book of Common Prayer, five additional prayers were added to close the service.

In modern practice, the anthem is usually followed by some prayers of intercession, or sometimes a sermon, before the congregation is dismissed.

== Music ==
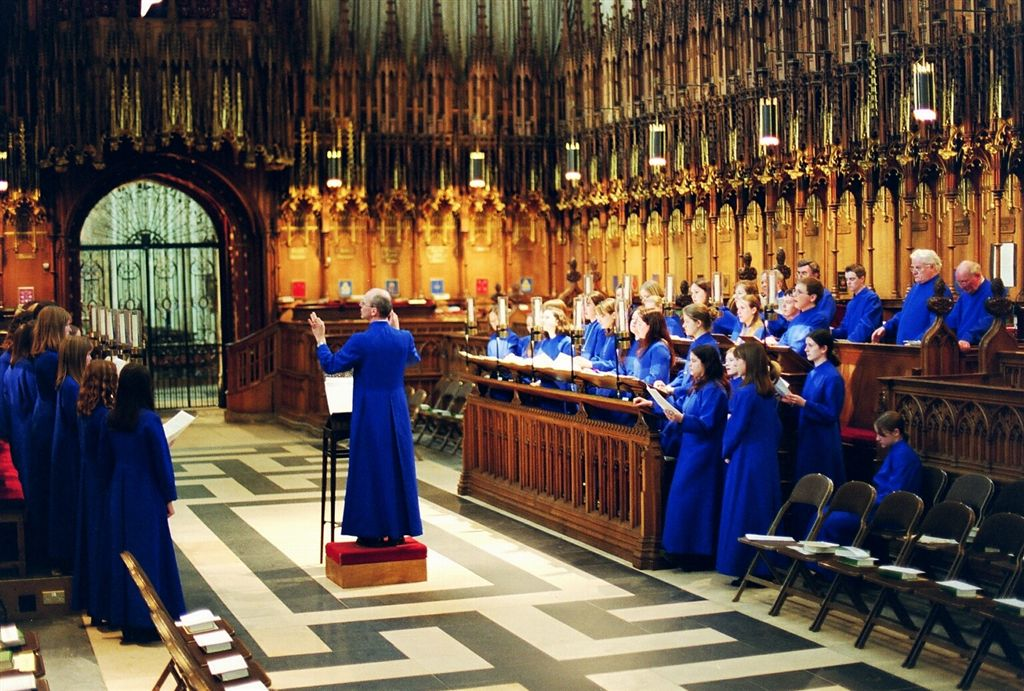
A choir rehearsing for choral Evensong in York Minster

Since the services of Morning and Evening Prayer were introduced in the 16th century, their constituent parts have been set to music for choirs to sing. A rich musical tradition spanning these centuries has developed, with the canticles not only having been set by church music composers such as Herbert Howells and Charles Villiers Stanford, but also by well-known composers of classical music such as Henry Purcell, Felix Mendelssohn, Edward Elgar, and Arvo Pärt. Evening Prayer sung by a choir (usually called 'choral Evensong') is particularly common. In such choral services, all of the service from the opening responses to the anthem, is usually sung or chanted, except the lessons from the Bible, and the Creed.

Settings of the opening responses and the section from the Kyrie and Lord's Prayer up to the end of the collects are suitable for both Morning and Evening Prayer and are usually known by the title 'Preces and Responses'; settings of the canticles differ between the two services and, especially in the latter case, are usually called a "service" (i.e. 'Morning Service' and 'Evening Service'). Almost every Anglican composer of note has composed a setting of one or both components of the choral service at some point in their career. In addition, the freedom of choirs (and thus composers) to select music freely for the anthem after the collect has encouraged the composition of a large number of general religious choral works intended to be sung in this context.

The sung Anglican Daily Office has also generated its own tradition in psalm-singing called Anglican chant, where a simple harmonised melody is used, adapting the number of syllables in the psalm text to fit a fixed number of notes, in a manner similar to a kind of harmonised plainsong. Similarly to settings of the responses and canticles, many Anglican composers have written melodies for Anglican chant.

The psalms and canticles may also be sung as plainsong. This is especially common during Lent and at other penitential times.

== See also ==
- Breviary
- Anglican church music
