= Kommt herbei, singt dem Herrn =

1972 German Catholic poem and hymn

- Christian hymn
- English: Come hither, sing to the Lord
- Written: 1972
- Text: Diethard Zils
- Language: German
- Based on: Psalm 95
- Melody: "Kol dodi" from Israel

"Kommt herbei, singt dem Herrn" (Come hither, sing to the Lord) is a Christian hymn with text by Diethard Zils in 1972, a paraphrase of Psalm 95 to an Israeli melody. It is of the genre Neues Geistliches Lied (NGL), published in 1972. In the 2013 Catholic hymnal Gotteslob, it appears as GL 140. It is also contained in other hymnals and songbooks.

== History ==
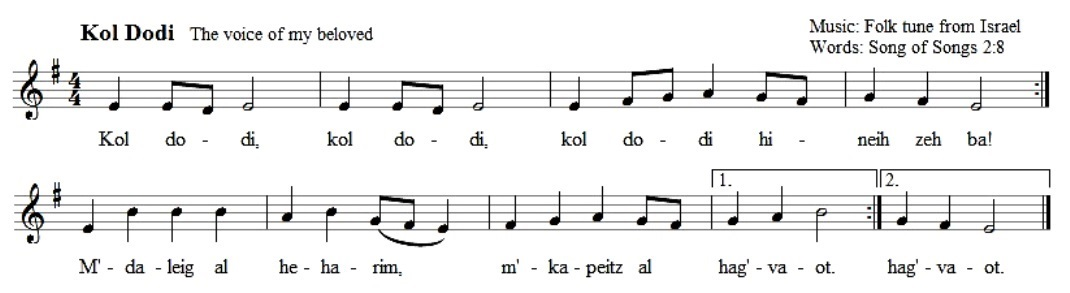
"Kol dodi" melody

The Dominican Diethard Zils wrote the text in 1972 as a paraphrase of Psalm 95, to a traditional melody from Israel, where the psalms were written. The melody is named "Kol dodi", and was used for a line from the Song of Songs. The song was published by Gustav Bosse Verlag in Kassel in 1972.

This song, of the Neues Geistliches Lied genre, was included in the German Catholic hymnal Gotteslob of 1975 as GL 270. In the 2013 edition it is GL 140 in the section for the opening of church services. In the regional section of Baden of the Protestant hymnal Evangelisches Gesangbuch, it is EG 617. It is part of many other songbooks.

== Text and melody ==
Zils created the text in six stanzas of four lines each, to a popular melody from Israel. Every line is repeated; thus each line can be performed by cantor or choir, then repeated by the congregation.

The beginning is a call ("Come") to get together and sing to the Lord, who is described as the one "der uns befreit" (who frees us). The related verse from Psalm 95 reads: "O come, let us sing unto the LORD: let us make a joyful noise to the rock of our salvation". In Jewish tradition, "salvation" often referred to the exodus from Egypt. The third line calls to the singer to face Him while singing, as in the psalm, explaining in the fourth line: "mehr als Worte sagt ein Lied" (a song says more than words).

The song was originally in G minor, but was transposed for the Gotteslob to E minor.
