= Nocturns =

Christian prayer

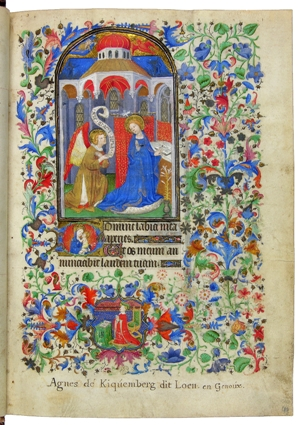
Opening verse of matins

Nocturns (Latin: nocturni or nocturna) is a Christian canonical hour said in the nighttime.

In the liturgy of the Roman Rite of the Catholic Church, nocturns refer to the sections into which the canonical hour of Matins was divided from the fourth or fifth century until after the Second Vatican Council.

A nocturn consisted of psalms accompanied by antiphons and followed by readings, which were taken either from Scripture or from the Church Fathers or similar writings. Matins was composed of one to three nocturns.

Originating in a prayer service celebrated by early Christians at night, the liturgical office of matins was originally in Latin called vigilia (vigil, "watch"). The plural form, vigiliae, also came into use.

In Oriental Orthodox Christianity and Oriental Protestant Christianity, the office is prayed at 12 am, being known as Lilio in the Syriac and Indian traditions; it is prayed facing the eastward direction of prayer by all members in these denominations, both clergy and laity, being one of the seven fixed prayer times.

== History ==
From the time of the early Church, the practice of seven fixed prayer times have been taught; in Apostolic Tradition, Hippolytus instructed Christians to pray seven times a day "on rising, at the lighting of the evening lamp, at bedtime, at midnight" and "the third, sixth and ninth hours of the day, being hours associated with Christ's Passion." With respect to midnight prayer and the ablutions preceding it, Hippolytus wrote:

Around midnight rise and wash your hands with water and pray. If you are married, pray together. But if your spouse is not yet baptized, go into another room to pray, and then return to bed. Do not hesitate to pray, for one who has been joined in marital relations is not impure. Those who have bathed have no need to wash again, for they are pure. By catching your breath in your hand and signing yourself with the moisture of your breath, your body is purified, even to the feet. For the gift of the Spirit and the outpouring of the baptism, proceeding from the heart of the believer as though from a fountain, purifies the one who has believed. Thus it is necessary to pray at this hour. For those elders who handed down the tradition to us taught us that in this hour every creature hushes for a brief moment to praise the Lord. Stars and trees and waters stand still for an instant. All the host of angels serving him, together with the souls of the righteous, praise God. This is why it is important that all those who believe make certain to pray at that hour. Testifying to this, the Lord says thus, "Behold, a cry was made at midnight, saying, 'Behold the bridegroom is coming! Arise to meet him!'" And he adds, saying, "Watch, therefore, for you do not know when the hour is coming."

The early-Christian custom of praying at night is mentioned by Tertullian (c. 155 – c. 240), who speaks of their "nocturnal convocations" and their "absence all the night long at the paschal solemnities" (nocturnae convocationes, sollemnibus Paschae abnoctantes) Cyprian (c. 200 – 258) also speaks of praying at night, but not of doing so as a group: "Let there be no failure of prayers in the hours of night — no idle and reckless waste of the occasions of prayer"(nulla sint horis nocturnis precum damna, nulla orationum pigra et ignava dispendia). The Apostolic Tradition speaks of prayer at midnight and again at cockcrow, but seemingly as private, not communal, prayer.

Prayer at midnight and at cockcrow was associated with passages in the Gospel of Matthew and the Gospel of Mark. On the basis of the Gospel of Luke too, prayer at any time of the night was also seen as having eschatological significance.

The quotation above from Tertullian refers to the all-night vigil service held at Easter. A similar service came to be held in the night that led to any Sunday. It corresponded in a way to the later early-night vespers, midnight vigil and dawn lauds and was sometimes referred to as three vigils or watches (vigiliae), as by Methodius of Olympus and Jerome. By the fourth century this Sunday vigil had become a daily observance, but no longer lasted throughout the night. What had been an all-night vigil became a service only from cockcrow to before dawn. Saint Benedict wrote about it as beginning at about 2 in the morning ("the eighth hour of the night") and ending in winter well before dawn (leaving an interval in which the monks were to devote themselves to study or meditation) but having to be curtailed in summer in order to celebrate lauds at daybreak.

In the writings of John Cassian (c. 360–435) is found the earliest mention of dividing the vigil service into three parts, thus breaking the monotony of the long night prayer. The Peregrinatio ad loca sancta of about 380 still gave no evidence of any division of the office of vigils whether on Sundays or on weekdays.

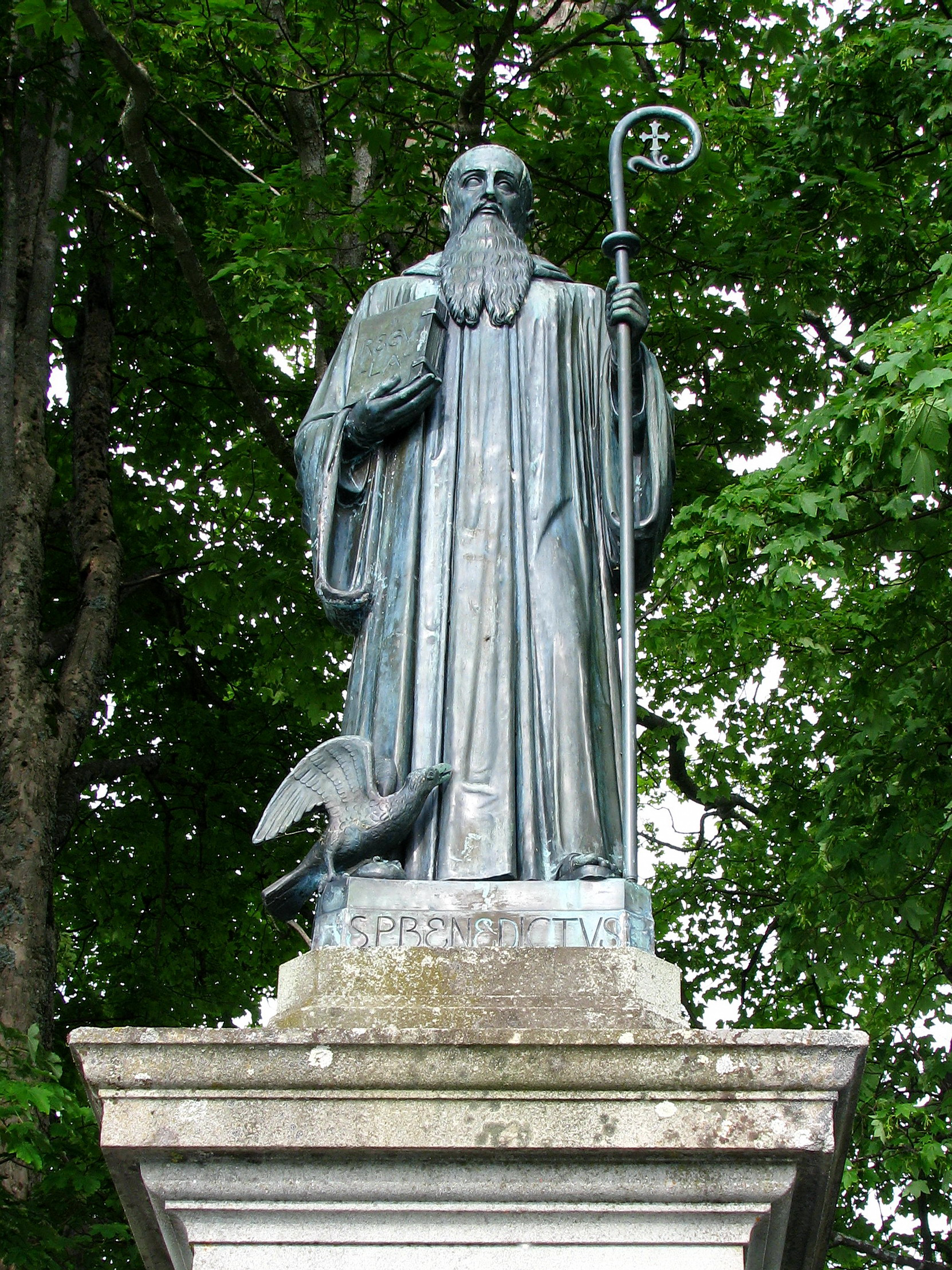
Statue of Saint Benedict of Nursia

Saint Benedict of Nursia (480 – c. 543 or 547) gives a detailed description of the division of vigils into two parts (for which he does not use the name "nocturns") on ordinary days, and three on Sundays and feast-days. The term nocturnus (nocturnal) appears nine times in his Rule. As an adjective four times (chapters 9, 10, 16 and 43) qualifying vigiliae (vigils), once (chapter 9) qualifying psalmi (psalms), once (chapter 10) qualifying laus (praise), and once (chapter 42) qualifying hora (hour). It appears twice (chapters 15 and 17) in the plural form, nocturni, with no express mention of a qualified noun, and thus practically as itself a noun equivalent to vigiliae. Psalmi (psalms) may be the masculine plural noun that it was originally understood as qualifying. In chapter 17, the phrase used is nocturni vel matutini, mentioned in relation to the psalms of the two hours that were later called matins and lauds, as a prelude to speaking of the psalms in the six other canonical hours.

Leonard J. Doyle's English version of the Rule of St Benedict translates horis nocturnis in chapter 42 as "the hours of the night", but elsewhere uses "the Night Office" to represent the entirety of each phrase in the Rule consisting of one of the nouns vigiliae, laus, hora, qualified by nocturnus; to render an isolated nocturnus in chapters 15 and 17; and to translate vigiliae wherever it appears unaccompanied by nocturnus. Nowhere does it use the word "nocturns".

The Rule of St Benedict laid down that on ordinary days, after the introductory psalms, there were two nocturns. The first consisted of six psalms followed by three reading, each of which was accompanied by a sung responsory. The second nocturn had another six psalms followed by a passage from Saint Paul recited by heart and by some prayers. In the shorter summer months the three readings of the first nocturn were replaced by an Old Testament passage recited by heart.

On Sundays, the monks rose earlier. The first nocturn had four readings instead of three, and the second nocturn also had four readings instead of recitation by heart of a passage of Saint Paul. Then followed a third nocturn, which instead of six psalms had three Old Testament canticles. These were followed by four readings from the New Testament and a reading by the abbot from the Gospels.

== Practice by Christian denomination ==
=== Roman Catholic practice ===
Within the Carolingian Empire (800–888), a form of the liturgy of the hours, described by Amalarius, was imposed that can be called the "Roman-Benedictine Office". In this form, the first nocturn of the Sunday vigil or matins had twelve psalms sung in three groups of four psalms, each group treated as a single psalm with a single doxology at the end. This was followed by three readings, each with a responsory. In each of the other two nocturns the readings and responsories were also three, but each nocturn had only three individual psalms instead of three groups of four. The ferial vigil had only one nocturn, composed of six groups of two psalms, followed by three readings with their responsories.

On the basis of the practice of the Roman Curia the texts and rubrics of the various books used for the celebration of the liturgy of the hours were combined at the beginning of the thirteenth century into the Breviarium secundum usum Romanae Curiae. A revision of this under Pope Honorius III was adopted by the Franciscans and by them popularized throughout Europe. It introduced many hymns but also led to celebration being spoken rather than sung. It was the main basis of Pope Pius V's Roman Breviary of 1568, the contents of which became much more the private prayer of the clergy than the communal prayer of the Christian people, and the canonical hours became disassociated from particular times of the day.

This tendency of viewing the Liturgy of the Hours as edification and spiritual nourishment of individual clergy rather than a form of worship had been strengthened by the publication in 1535, and the widespread printing of the drastically modified breviary of Cardinal Francisco de Quiñones, which restored generally the weekly recitation of the whole psalter and the reading of the major part of the Bible in a year, but which provoked a reaction that led to the determination of the Council of Trent to restore a somewhat purified form of the previously existing form of the Liturgy of the Hours. It fell to Pope Pius V to put into effect the Council's desire.

In the Roman Breviary as arranged by Pope Pius V in 1568, Sunday matins has three nocturns, the first with 12 independent psalms, the second and third with 3 psalms each, and each nocturn has 3 readings. Feasts of double or semidouble rank have 3 nocturns, each with 3 psalms and 3 readings. On a feast of simple rank, a feria or a vigil day, there is no division into nocturns and the 12 psalms and 3 readings are treated as a single nocturn. In comparison with the post-Vatican II revision, the readings are very brief.

In 1911 Pope Pius X introduced a radical revision of the psalter of the Roman Breviary. He ended many of the previous repetitions of the same psalms day after day. For instance, Psalms 148–150, which previously were said every day at the end of lauds and which may have given that hour the name of "lauds", were each said only once in the week and no longer together. The longer psalms were divided into portions, which in many cases were assigned to different hours and days. In his completely new arrangement, matins always had nine psalms or portions of psalms, whether distributed in groups of three among three nocturns, each nocturn of which had three readings, or, on liturgically less important days, recited as a single group and followed by only three readings. It was planned to proceed also to a revision of the readings at matins in view of the excessive abbreviation of the scriptural readings and the inclusion of unhistorical content in the accounts of the saints. This revision was not in fact carried out until after the Second Vatican Council, but concrete work on it had already begun under Pope Pius XII.

The 1960 Code of Rubrics of Pope John XXIII specified what celebrations had three nocturns:

- Feasts of I or II class;
- Ferias of the Triduum sacrum;
- Octave Day of Christmas;
- All Souls' Day.

The Code of Rubrics removed the multiplicity of nocturns from matins of Sundays, apart from those that were I class feasts (Easter and Pentecost). This required a reduction in the number of readings. The three former scriptural readings were combined into two, and the first part of the homily in the previous third nocturn became the new third reading.

=== Abolition of nocturns ===
With his apostolic constitution Laudis canticum of 1 November 1970, Pope Paul VI announced his revision of the Latin-Church Liturgy of the Hours, involving among other things distribution of the psalms over a period of four weeks instead of the previous arrangement whereby they were said within a single week.

In line with the decision of the Second Vatican Council that matins, while retaining its character of nocturnal praise should become a prayer for any hour of the day, that canonical hour was renamed the Office of Readings and to it were assigned two substantial readings, one from Scripture, the second from the Fathers of the Church or other writers, and only three psalms or portions of psalms. This contrasted strongly with the arrangement to which the Rule of Saint Benedict gave witness: twelve complete psalms, to which on Sundays three canticles were added. In the Benedictine system, the psalms and the readings were distributed among two or three nocturns. Between Benedict and Paul VI the two-nocturns arrangement had been done away with, and on days when matins was not divided into three nocturns it was spoken of as being of a single "nocturn". With the reform of Paul VI, the term "nocturns", whether in the singular or the plural form, ceased to be used.

== Oriental Orthodox Christianity ==
=== Syriac Orthodox Church, Indian Orthodox Church and Mar Thoma Syrian Church ===
In the Syriac Orthodox Church and Indian Orthodox Church (both of which are Oriental Orthodox Churches), as well as the Mar Thoma Syrian Church (an Oriental Protestant denomination), Nocturns is known as Lilio and is prayed at 12 am using the Shehimo breviary. It contains three watches in which the Quamo prayer is devoutly recited.

=== Coptic Orthodox Church of Alexandria ===
In the Coptic Orthodox Church, an Oriental Orthodox denomination, the Midnight Praise is prayed at 12 am using the Agpeya breviary.

=== External links ===
- Easter Nocturns from the Sarum Use (Wantage, 1954)
