= Sag ja zu mir, wenn alles nein sagt =

- Neues Geistliches Lied
- Occasion: Penitence
- Written: 1971
- Text: by Diethard Zils
- Language: German
- Melody: by Ignace de Sutter
- Composed: 1959
- Published: 1975

"Sag ja zu mir, wenn alles nein sagt" (Say yes to me when all say no) is Christian hymn, with lyrics written by Diethard Zils in 1971, and music by made a hymn of the genre Neues Geistliches Lied with a melody by Ignace de Sutter. It is a penitential song, which appeared in the Catholic hymnal Gotteslob of 1975. In the 2013 version, it appears only in regional sections.

== History ==
"Sag ja zu mir, wenn alles nein sagt" was written by Diethard Zils in 1971, in five stanzas, with verses of four lines which rhyme and a refrain which is a biblical quotation. It is a penitential song, taking as a starting point reflection of mistakes and rejection by many, but the hope that God who is addressed will accept and forgive. The refrain requests to open the mouth of the singer for praise ("Tu meinen Mund auf, dich zu loben"), and to give a new spirit ("und gib mir einen neuen Geist"). The hymn appeared in the first common Catholic hymnal in German, the Gotteslob of 1975. It was recommended as a Psalmlied, a hymn suitable to be sung instead of a psalm between the first and second reading in the liturgy, although it is no paraphrase of a specific psalm. In the 2013 version of the hymnal, the hymn appears only in regional sections, such as the Diocese of Limburg, which has it as GL 767 in the section Österliche Bußzeit (Fastenzeit), which translates to: Time of penitence before Easter (Lent). The song is part of several songbooks.

Zils set his text to a melody which Ignace de Sutter had composed in 1959. The melody in C minor moves in even flow, beginning on C in low register, highlighting "nein (no) by a longer note, while otherwise only the last syllable of a line is held longer. The refrain is reminiscent of psalm recitation, using only three pitches around G, until it rises when the new spirit is mentioned, and ends an octave higher than the beginning.
