= Suchen und fragen, hoffen und sehn =

Sacred evening song by Paul Gerhardt

- Christian hymn
- Written: 2006
- Text: by Diethard Zils
- Language: German
- Based on: "Au coer de nos détresses
- Melody: by Jo Akepsimas

"Suchen und fragen, hoffen und sehn" ("Searching and asking, hoping and seeing") is a 2006 hymn of the genre Neues Geistliches Lied (NGL) in German by Diethard Zils, with a melody by Jo Akepsimas. It is part of the 2013 Catholic hymnal Gotteslob and of many songbooks.

== History ==
Diethard Zils wrote the text of "Suchen und fragen, hoffen und sehn" in 2006. The melody was composed by Jo Akepsimas. The song, of the genre Neues Geistliches Lied (NGL), is in three stanzas with a refrain, The stanzas have three lines, rhyming AAB, and the refrain, rhyming B, is repeated. The stanzas list different ways of acting together, with "und sich verstehn" (and understand each other) ending every second line. The refrain expresses that in this togetherness, God speaks his "yes", while "our no" dies.

"Suchen und fragen, hoffen und sehn" is part of the Catholic hymnal Gotteslob as GL 457, published in 2013. It is contained in more than 30 songbooks.
