= Lauds =

Major canonical hour in liturgy

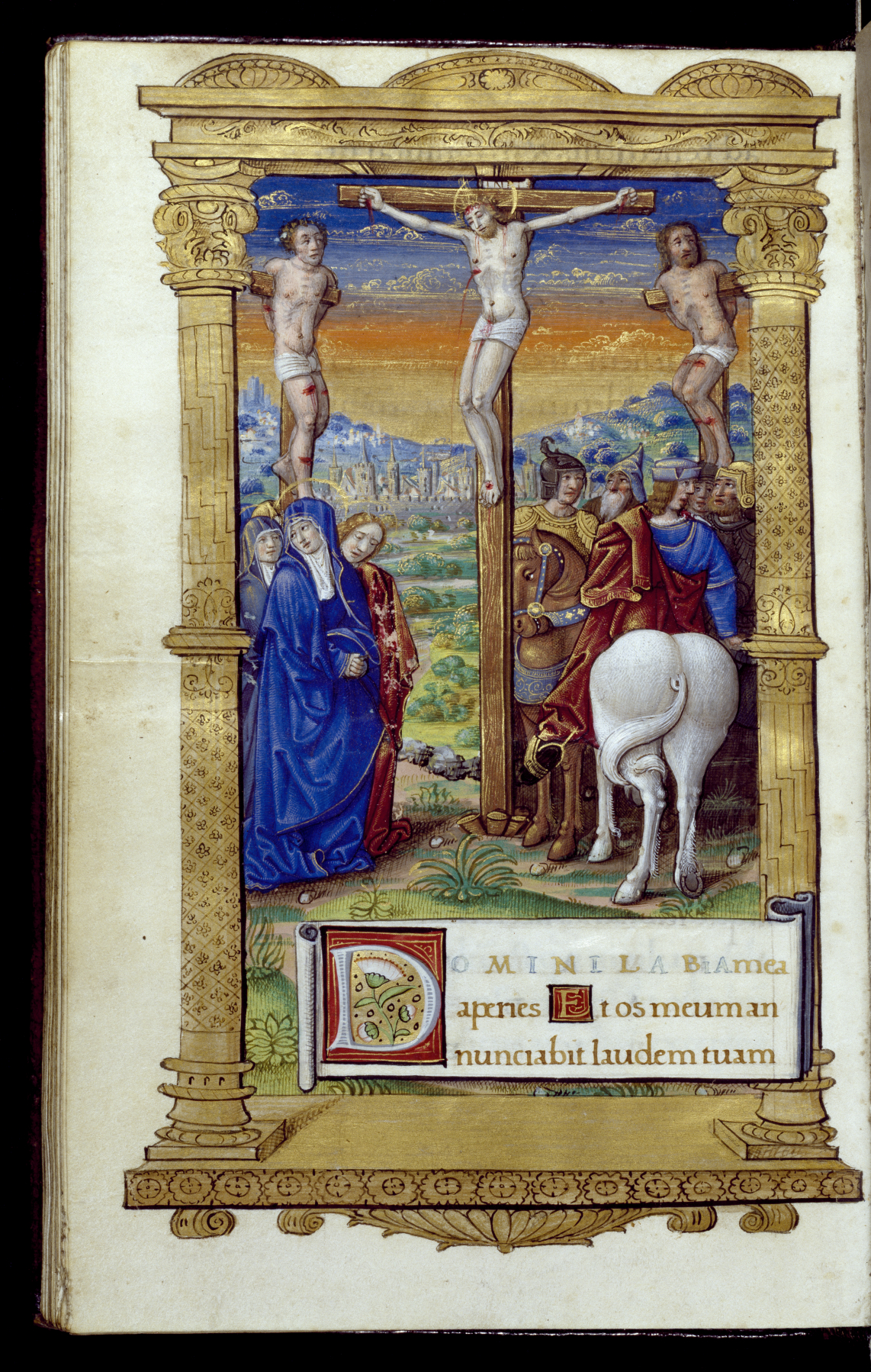
The verse Domine, labia mea aperies et os meum annuntiabit laudem tuam is sung at the opening of the first canonical hour of the day

Lauds are a canonical hour of the Divine office. In the Roman Rite Liturgy of the Hours it is one of the major hours, usually held after Matins, in the early morning hours.

== Name ==
The name, from Latin laus, praise, is derived from the three last psalms of the psalter (148, 149, 150), the Laudate psalms, which were in former versions of the Lauds of the Roman Rite prayed every day, and in all of which the word laudate is repeated frequently. At first, the word Lauds designated only the end, that is to say, these three psalms. Over time, Lauds came to be applied to the whole office.

== History ==
Lauds as the morning prayer of the church are one of the most ancient offices and can be traced back to Apostolic times. The earliest evidence of Lauds appears in the second and third centuries in the Canons of Hippolytus and in writings by St. Cyprian, and the Apostolic Fathers. Descriptions during the fourth and fifth centuries appear in writings by Ss. John Cassian, Melania the Younger, Hilary of Poitiers, Eusebius, John Chrysostom, and in the Peregrinatio Ætheriae. During the 6th century St. Benedict of Nursia gave a detailed description of them in his rule. Gregory of Tours also made several allusions to this office, which he calls Matutini hymni.

According to John T. Hedrick, in Introduction to the Roman Breviary, Lauds were not originally a distinct canonical hour but Matins and Lauds formed a single office, the night office terminating only at dawn. The monks prayed Matins during the night and said Lauds in the early dawn. In the 5th and 6th century the Lauds were called Matutinum. By the Middle Ages, the midnight office was referred to as Nocturns, and the morning office as Matins. The lengthy night office later became the liturgical hour of Matins and was divided into two or three nocturns; the morning office became Lauds.

After Pope Pius X’s reform, Lauds was reduced to four psalms or portions of psalms and an Old Testament canticle, putting an end to the custom of adding the last three psalms of the psalter (148–150) at the end of Lauds every day.

=== Symbolism and significance ===
This is the office of daybreak and hence its symbolism is also of Christ's resurrection, "the true light enlightening all people and 'the sun of justice', 'rising from on high'". According to Fernand Cabrol, "Lauds remains the true morning prayer, which hails in the rising sun, the image of Christ triumphant—consecrates to Him the opening day". The office of Lauds reminds the Christian that the first act of the day should be praise, and that one's thoughts should be of God before facing the cares of the day. According to the General Instruction on the Liturgy of the Hours, Lauds as morning prayer and Vespers as evening prayer "are the two hinges on which the daily Office turns"

== Current Catholic practice ==
=== Liturgia horarum (1970) ===
In the 1970 edition of the Roman Breviary which was revised according to the mandate of the Second Vatican Council, Lauds (Latin Laudes matutinae, pl.) has the following structure:

- The standard opening responsory of Deus, in adiutorium meum intende, followed by the Gloria Patri, and the Alleluia which is omitted in Lent (unless Lauds are the first prayer of the day, in which case the opening responses are replaced by the Invitatory)
- The hymn, which is optional when combining with Matins
- A morning psalm, an Old Testament canticle, and a psalm of praise all of them with their antiphons
- A reading according to the liturgical day, season or feast
- A responsorial song or a short responsory
- The Benedictus, with its antiphon
- The Preces
- The Lord's Prayer
- The Collect
- Blessing and dismissal (if prayed a cleric is present), otherwise the celebration is concluded with "The Lord bless us..."

All psalms and canticles are concluded with the doxology. The psalms and readings are distributed in a four-week cycle, which forms the heart of the prayer.

==== Variations ====
On all solemnities and feasts as well as on all feast days of the saints with their own Lauds antiphons in the proper, the psalms and cantica from the Sunday of the Week I are sung. These are: Ps. 63, the canticle from Dan 3, 37-88 and Ps. 149.

On feasts of saints the various parts of the hour may be taken from the office of the saint being celebrated or from the common. If the feast has the rank of a memorial, any parts specifically provided for the saint (the parts from the proper) are used, while the other parts come from the weekday, with exception of the hymn (which may be optionally taken from the common texts), the antiphon for the Benedictus (which must be taken from the proper or the common), the intercession (which may be optionally taken from the common texts), and the collect.

In some seasons of the liturgical year, such as Lent or Eastertide, many of the prayers are proper for each day of the season. In Holy Week, the octaves of Christmas and Easter, and the last eight days of Advent, these liturgical days displace the celebration of other feasts.

=== Other rites of the Western Church ===
In the Ambrosian Office, and also in the Mozarabic, Lauds retained a few of the principal elements of the Roman Lauds: the Benedictus, canticles from the Old Testament, and the laudate psalms, arranged, however, in a different order (cf. Germain Morin, op. cit. in bibliography). In the Benedictine liturgy, the office of Lauds resembles the Roman Lauds very closely, not only in its use of the canticles but also in its general construction.

== Armenian liturgy ==
The Armenian Morning (or Early) Hour (Armenian: Առաւաւտեան Ժամ, romanized: aṛawotean zham) corresponds to the office of Lauds in the Roman Liturgy, both in its position in the daily cycle and in its importance. This is the most complex of all Armenian liturgies in terms of the variations in the order and text of the liturgy depending on the day of the week, liturgical tone, commemoration of the day, and liturgical season.

Many manuscripts and printed editions of the Armenian Book of Hours (Armenian: Ժամագիրք, romanized: Zhamagirk`) state that the morning hour commemorates the Son of God, with some manuscripts adding, "at the time he was seized by the Jews". This is in reference to the story of the arrest and interrogation of Jesus found in the New Testament Gospels.

=== Outline of the morning service ===
In the morning hour for Sundays and feasts there are seven slots into which hymnody may be inserted which reflects the theme of the day. Each of these seven slots is associated with a psalm or canticle from the Old or New Testaments.

== Eastern Christianity ==
Among the Eastern Orthodox and Eastern Catholic Churches which follow the Byzantine Rite, the office comparable to the Lauds of the Roman Rite is the Orthros. It also contains the three Laudate psalms (148–150), with which it traditionally closes.

== In Protestantism ==
Like the other canonical hours, Lauds is observed by certain Protestant denominations, notably those of the Lutheran churches. In the Anglican Communion, elements of the office have been folded into the service of Morning Prayer as celebrated according to the Book of Common Prayer, and the hour itself is observed by many Anglican religious orders.
