= Invitatory =

Psalm used to start daily prayers

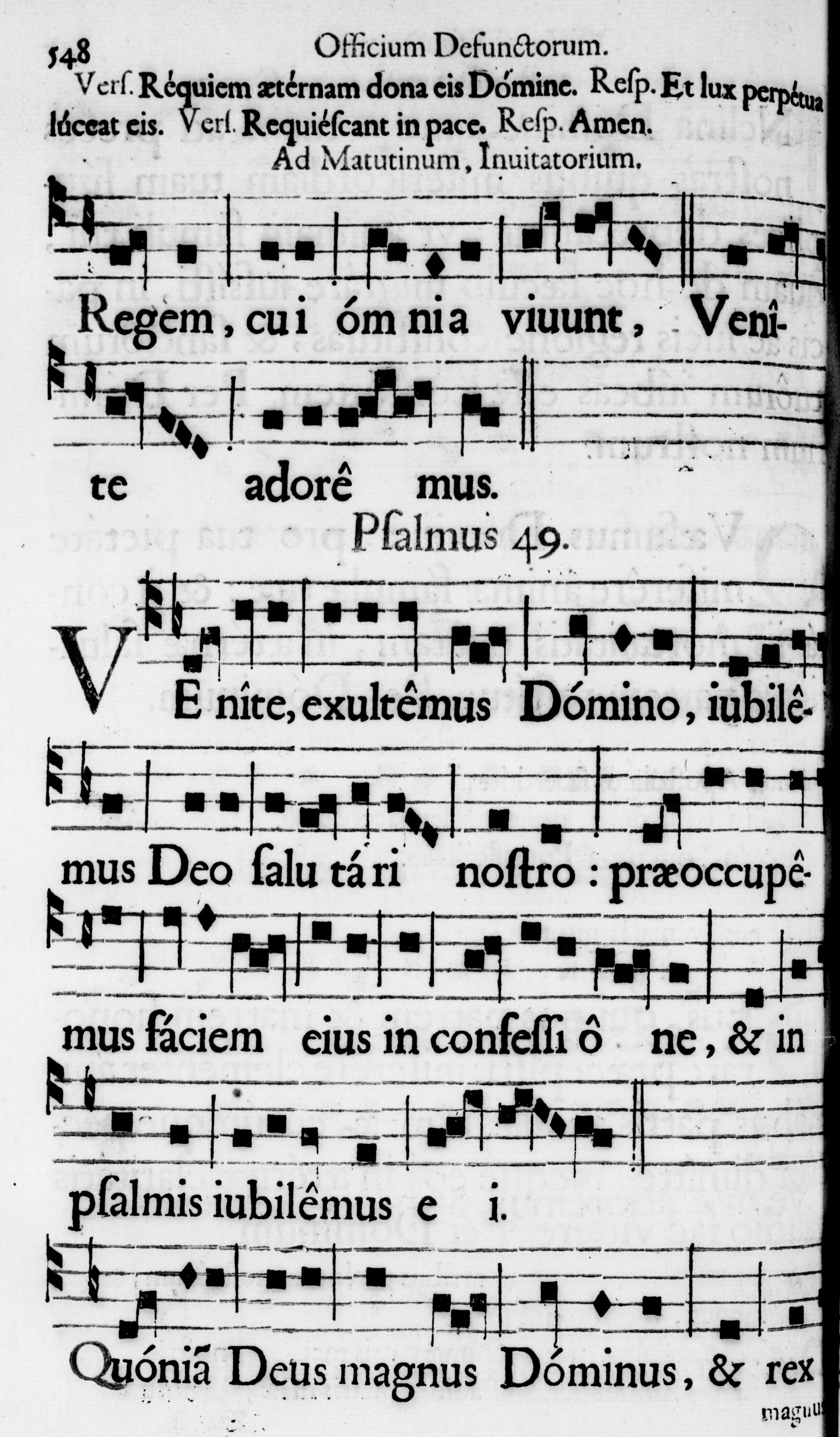
Invitatory of the Office of the Dead: with the antiphon Regem qui omnia viuunt ("Come, let us worship the King, who gives life to all things") and Psalm 94 from the Psalterium monasticum, 1626

The invitatory (Latin: invitatorium; also invitatory psalm) begins the Divine Office of a liturgical day in Catholic and Anglican traditions. It consists of the versicle: Domine, labia mea aperies... ("Lord, open our lips: And we shall praise your name"), and a responsorially sung psalm. Most often it is Psalm 94(95), also known as the Venite, from his opening words "Come, let us sing for joy before the Lord"). (Note: Numbered 94 in the Greek Septuagint, 95 in the Hebrew Masoretic Text: see Psalms > Numbering.) The term invitatory derives from Medieval Latin invītātōrium, derived from invītāre, "to invite." The invitatory includes an antiphon to the psalm, which changes depending on the feast or time in the liturgical year and culminates in the exclamation Venite adoremus ("Come, let us adore him").

== Catholic ==
The invitatory is used to start Nocturns in the Liturgy of the Hours, the Catholic Church's Divine Office. It is usually Psalm 94(95). After the reform of the Liturgy of the Hours following the Second Vatican Council, the Invitatory is sung or said either before Matins or Lauds, whichever is said first in a liturgical day. In place of Psalm 94(95), Psalm 99(100), Psalm 66(67), or Psalm 23(24) may be used as circumstances may suggest.

== Anglican ==
In the Episcopal Church, the Morning Prayer office opens with an invitatory psalm, either the Venite (Psalm 95:1-7, or the entire psalm on Ash Wednesday, Holy Saturday, and all Fridays in Lent) or the Jubilate (Psalm 100). An invitatory antiphon may appear before, or before and after the invitatory psalm. The invitatory may be spoken or sung; there are several musical settings in plainsong or Anglican chant.

An invitatory psalm may also be substituted for the Phos Hilaron in Evening Prayer.
