= Nostrum Oil & Gas =

Nostrum Oil & Gas plc
- Company type: Public limited company
- Traded as: LSE: NOG
- Industry: Oil production
- Founded: 1997; 29 years ago
- Headquarters: Amsterdam, Netherlands
- Key people: Atul Gupta; Kai-Uwe Kessel (CEO)
- Revenue: $348.0 million (2016)
- Operating income: $(64.5) million (2016)
- Net income: $(81.9) million (2016)
- Website: nostrumoilandgas.com

Nostrum Oil & Gas is an oil and gas exploration and production company operating in Kazakhstan. The company is listed on the London Stock Exchange.

== History ==
The company was established as Zhaikmunai LP in 1997 to exploit opportunities in Kazakhstan and started production in its first field in October 2000. After acquiring interests in three additional fields in August 2012, it changed its name to Nostrum Oil & Gas in December 2013. It was the subject of an initial public offering in June 2014. In March 2023 the company acquired 80% stake in Positive Invest LLC, which owns the rights for the Kamenskoye and Kamensko-Teplovsko-Tokarevskoye fields in the Republic of Kazakhstan. The transaction value under the agreement was $20 million.

== Operations ==
The company operates in the following fields:

- Chinarevskoye Field
- Rostoshinskoye Field
- Darjinskoye Field
- Yuzhno-Gremyachenskoye Field
