= Diethard Zils =

German Catholic priest hymnodist (b. 1935)

- Born: 1935 (age 90–91); Bottrop
- Occupations: Theologian; Priest; Hymnwriter

Diethard Zils O.P. (born 1935) is a German Dominican, priest and hymnwriter.

Born in Bottrop, Zils is known as a hymnwriter for the genre Neues Geistliches Lied and a translator of such songs. They have been included in the Catholic hymnal Gotteslob (GL), and also in Protestant hymnals such as Evangelisches Gesangbuch (EG) and the Mennonitisches Gesangbuch (MG). They were set to music by notable composers:

== Selected works ==
- "Abraham, Abraham, verlass dein Land" (music: Wim ter Burg) (EG 311)
- "Ein befreiendes Lied" (music: Ludger Stühlmeyer) (youth music festival at Clemenswerth 1992)
- "Frieden und Shalom" (melody from Israel)
- "Im Dunkel unsrer Ängste" (music: Jo Akepsimas) (MG 296)
- "Kommt herbei, singt dem Herrn" (melody from Israel, GL 140)
- "Lass uns den Weg der Gerechtigkeit gehen" (music: Cristóbal Halffter Jiménez) (MG 490)
- "Lobt und preist die herrlichen Taten" (music: Lucien Deiss) (EG 429)
- "Mädchen du in Israel" (music by Albe Vidakovic)
- "Pilger sind wir Menschen" (after the melody of "Land of Hope and Glory" by Edward Elgar)
- "Sag ja zu mir, wenn alles nein sagt" (music by Ignace de Sutter, 1959, GL Austria 815 and other regional sections)
- "Seht ihr unsern Stern dort stehen" for Epiphany
- "Suchen und fragen, hoffen und sehn" (music: Jo Akepsimas, GL 457)
- "Wir haben Gottes Spuren festgestellt" (music: Jo Akepsimas, MG 406)
- "Wir preisen deinen Tod" (music: Michael Ambroise Wackenheim, 1986, GL different regional sections)
