= Common (liturgy) =

The common or common of saints (Latin: commune sanctorum) is a part of the Christian liturgy that consists of texts common to an entire category of saints, such as apostles or martyrs. The term is used in contrast to the ordinary, which is that part of the liturgy that is reasonably constant, or at least selected without regard to date, and to the proper, which is the part of the liturgy that varies according to the date, either representing an observance within the liturgical year, or of a particular saint or significant event.

Commons contain collects, psalms, readings from scripture, prefaces, and other portions of services that are common to a category of saints. This contrasts with propers, which contain the same elements as commons, but are tailored to specific occasions or feasts. Commons may be used to celebrate lesser feasts and observances in the Church calendar.
