= Chapter and Conventual Mass =

Types of christian worship

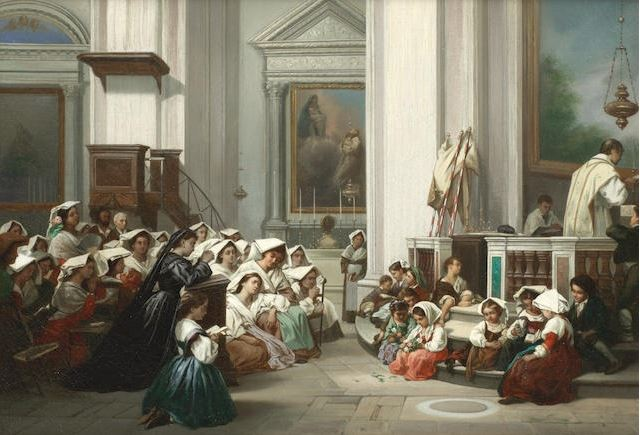
A conventual Mass, attended by sisters and by children enrolled in the convent school

As currently used, the terms Chapter Mass (for chapters of canons) and Conventual Mass (for most other houses of religious) refer to the Mass celebrated by and for a community of priests or for a community of priests and brothers or sisters.

Such Masses are normally concelebrated by most or all of the priests in a house in the case of a house of an order or other religious community that includes priests. The conventual Mass is therefore the daily "community Mass" for a local religious family – whether a convent, monastery or other house. It is normally linked with the Liturgy of the Hours, at which the community gathers to worship as a body: there are special norms in the rubrics for combining any one of the hours of the Divine Office with the celebration of Mass. The Mass and Office celebrated are those of the day, according to the rubrics and ordo of the order or house. The modern concept of the conventual Mass is laid out in the General Instruction of the Roman Missal.

== Historical use of the term ==
Before the reform of the Missale by Pope Paul VI, concelebration was not permitted, and so each priest in a monastery or other house celebrated his own Mass privately, and then participated "in choir" in a conventual Mass celebrated by one of the priests of the house.

Prior to the Second Vatican Council (1962–1965), as a general rule, churches in which the Divine office was to be said publicly every day also had to have Mass said daily. This Mass was the "conventual" Mass (missa conventualis); it completed, with the canonical Hours, the official public service of God in such a church. A conventual Mass then was to be sung or said in all cathedrals and collegiate churches that had a chapter; in this case it was often called the "chapter" Mass (missa capituli), though the official books constantly used the general name "conventual" for this Mass too. A conventual (not chapter) Mass also had to be celebrated daily in churches of regulars who had the obligation of the public recitation of the office, therefore certainly in churches of monks and canons regular.

Whether mendicant friars had this obligation is disputed. Some authors consider them to have been obliged by common canon law, others admit only whatever obligation they may have had from their special constitutions or from custom. Some extended the obligation even to churches of nuns who say the office in choir. That friars celebrated a daily conventual Mass according to the rule of monastic churches is admitted by every one (de Herdt., I, 14). A chapter Mass then was a kind of conventual Mass, and falls under the same rules.

The obligation of procuring the conventual Mass rested with the corporate body in question and so concerns its superiors (Dean, Provost, Abbot, etc.). Normally it should be said by one of the members, but the obligation is satisfied as long as it is said by some priest who celebrates lawfully.

The conventual Mass was always, if possible, a high Mass; but if this was impossible, low Mass was still treated as a high Mass with regard to the number of collects said, the candles, absence of prayers at the end and so on. It was not to be said during the recitation of the office, but at certain fixed times between the canonical Hours, as is explained below. The general rule was that the conventual Mass should correspond to the office with which it forms a whole. It was not allowed to sing two high Masses both conformed to the office on the same day. On the other hand, there were cases in which two different conventual Masses were celebrated. The cases in which the Mass did not correspond to the office were these: on Saturdays in Advent (except Ember Saturday and a vigil), if the office was ferial the Mass is of the Blessed Virgin; on Vigils in Advent that were not also Ember days, if the office was ferial the Mass was of the Vigil commemorating the feria; on Maundy Thursday and Holy Saturday; on Rogation Tuesday, if the office was ferial the Mass was of Rogation; on Whitsun Eve the office was of the Ascension, but the Mass a Whitsun Mass. When a Vigil, an Ember day or Rogation Monday fell within an octave (except that of the Blessed Sacrament) the office was of the octave and the Mass of the feria commemorating the octave. Except in Advent and Lent, on Ember days, Rogation days and vigils, if the office was ferial and the Sunday Mass had already been said that week, the conventual Mass could have been one of the Votive Masses in the Missal appointed for each day in the week. Except in Advent, Lent and Paschal time, on the first day of the month not prevented by a double or semi-double, the conventual Mass was a Requiem for deceased members and benefactors of the community.

On doubles, semi-doubles Sundays and during octaves, the conventual Mass was said after Terce, on simples and ferias after Sext, on ferias of Advent and Lent, on Vigils and Ember days after None. There were also occasions on which several conventual Masses are said on the same day. On ferias of Lent, on Ember days, Rogation days and Vigils when a double or semi-double occurs, or during an octave or when a Votive office was said, the Mass corresponding to the office is said after Terce, that of the feria after None. On Ascension eve, if a double or semi-double occurs, the Mass of the feast was said after Terce, that of the Vigil after Sext, that of Rogation after None. In the case of the conventual Requiem mentioned above, if a simple occurs or if the Mass of the preceding Sunday had not yet been said, the Requiem was celebrated after the Office of the Dead, or if that was not said, after Prime, the Mass of the simple or Sunday after Sext. On All Souls' Day (2 November) the Mass of the octave (or feast) was said after Terce, the Requiem after None. When an additional votive Mass had to be said (for instance for the Forty Hours or for the anniversary of the bishop's consecration or enthronement, etc.) it was said after None. On the Monday of each week (except in Lent and Paschal time) if the office was ferial the conventual Mass was permitted to be a Requiem. But if it were a simple or a feria with a proper Mass, or if the Sunday Mass had not been said, the collect for the dead (Fidelium) was added to that of the day instead.

These rules concerning the celebration of two or more conventual Masses applied as laws only to chapters. Regulars were not bound to celebrate more than one such Mass each day (corresponding always to the office), unless the particular constitutions of their order imposed this obligation.
