= Chaplet of Saint Michael =

Catholic chaplet

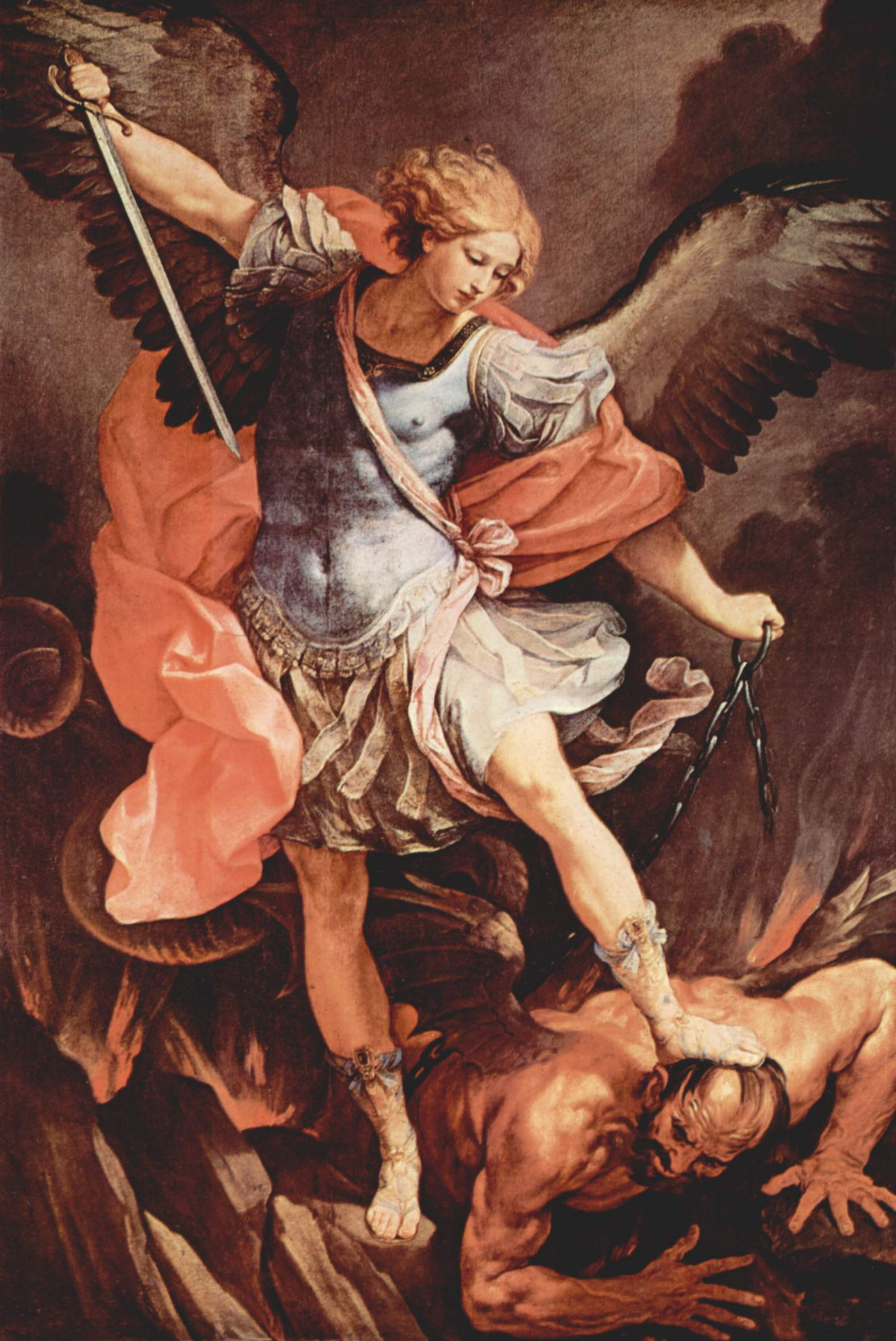
Archangel Michael defeats Satan, by Guido Reni (c. 1636)

The Chaplet of Saint Michael the Archangel, also called the Rosary of the Angels, is a chaplet approved by Pope Pius IX in 1851.

== Antónia d'Astónaco ==
Antónia d'Astónaco was a Portuguese Carmelite nun who reported a private revelation by Saint Michael the Archangel in 1750.

Sometime in the 1750s, d'Astónaco said that the Archangel Michael had indicated in an apparition that he would like to be honored, and God glorified, by the praying of nine special invocations. These nine invocations correspond to invocations to the nine choirs of angels and origins the Chaplet of Saint Michael. The prayers were approved by Pope Pius IX in 1851.

== Chaplet ==
The prayers are generally prayed with a chaplet, counting the prayers with it as one would do with a rosary. For those who would recite the Chaplet daily, Saint Michael reportedly promised his continual assistance and that of all the holy angels during life. Praying the chaplet is also believed gradually to defeat demons and gain a pure heart, thus delivering the petitioner from Purgatory. These blessings extend to the direct family.

The chaplet begins with an act of contrition. Then there are nine salutations, one for each choir of angels, each one followed by an Our Father and three Hail Marys. These are followed by four Our Fathers, honoring Saints Michael, Gabriel, Raphael and the Guardian Angel. The chaplet concludes with a prayer to Saint Michael.

- Sign of the Cross ("In the name of the Father, and of the Son, and of the Holy Spirit. Amen.")
- The chaplet begins with the following invitation consisting of the opening of Psalm 69 (70) and the Glory Be:
  - ℣. O GOD, come to my assistance. ℟. O LORD, make haste to help me.
  - ℣. Glory be to the Father, to the Son, and to the Holy Spirit. ℟. As it was in the beginning, is now and will be forever, time without end. Amen.

(Say one Our Father and three Hail Marys after each of the following nine salutations in honor of the nine Choirs of Angels, in descending order:)

1. By the intercession of Saint Michael and the celestial Choir of Seraphim may the Lord make us worthy to burn with the fire of perfect charity. Amen. (Our Father, Three Hail Marys)
2. By the intercession of Saint Michael and the celestial Choir of Cherubim, may the Lord grant us the grace to leave the ways of sin and run in the paths of Christian perfection. Amen. (Our Father, Three Hail Marys)
3. By the intercession of Saint Michael and the celestial Choir of Thrones, may the Lord infuse into our hearts a true and sincere spirit of humility. Amen. (Our Father, Three Hail Marys)
4. By the intercession of Saint Michael and the celestial Choir of Dominions, may the Lord give us grace to govern our senses and overcome any unruly passions. Amen. (Our Father, Three Hail Marys)
5. By the intercession of Saint Michael and the celestial Choir of Virtues, may the Lord preserve us from evil and falling into temptation. Amen. (Our Father, Three Hail Marys)
6. By the intercession of Saint Michael and the celestial Choir of Powers, may the Lord protect our souls against the snares and temptations of the devil. Amen. (Our Father, Three Hail Marys)
7. By the intercession of Saint Michael and the celestial Choir of Principalities, may God fill our souls with a true spirit of obedience. Amen. (Our Father, Three Hail Marys)
8. By the intercession of Saint Michael and the celestial Choir of Archangels, may the Lord give us perseverance in faith and in all good works in order that we may attain the glory of Heaven. Amen. (Our Father, Three Hail Marys)
9. By the intercession of Saint Michael and the celestial Choir of Angels, may the Lord grant us to be protected by them in this mortal life and conducted in the life to come to Heaven. Amen. (Our Father, Three Hail Marys)
- (Say four Our Fathers honouring each of the following Angels: St. Michael, St. Gabriel, St. Raphael, and one's Guardian Angel.)
- O glorious prince Saint Michael, chief and commander of the heavenly hosts, guardian of souls, vanquisher of rebel spirits, servant in the house of the Divine King and our admirable guide, you who shine with excellence and superhuman virtue deliver us from all evil, who turn to you with confidence and enable us by your gracious protection to serve God more and more faithfully every day.
- The following preces and Collect:
  - ℣. Pray for us, O glorious St. Michael, Prince of the Church of Jesus Christ.
  - ℟. That we may be made worthy of His promises.
  - Let us pray. Almighty and Everlasting God, Who, by a prodigy of goodness and a merciful desire for the salvation of all men, has appointed the most glorious Archangel Saint Michael, Prince of Your Church, make us worthy, we ask You, to be delivered from all our enemies, that none of them may harass us at the hour of death, but that we may be conducted by him into Your Presence. This we ask through the merits of Jesus Christ Our Lord. Amen.

== Promises ==
Saint Michael purportedly promised to those who recite these nine salutations, every day:

- That they would have an escort of nine angels, one from each of the nine choirs, as they approach the altar for Holy Communion (to receive the Eucharist).
- That they will enjoy his continued assistance and that of all of the holy angels during this life.
- That upon death, the devotee and all of their relations would receive deliverance from Purgatory.

== Indulgences ==
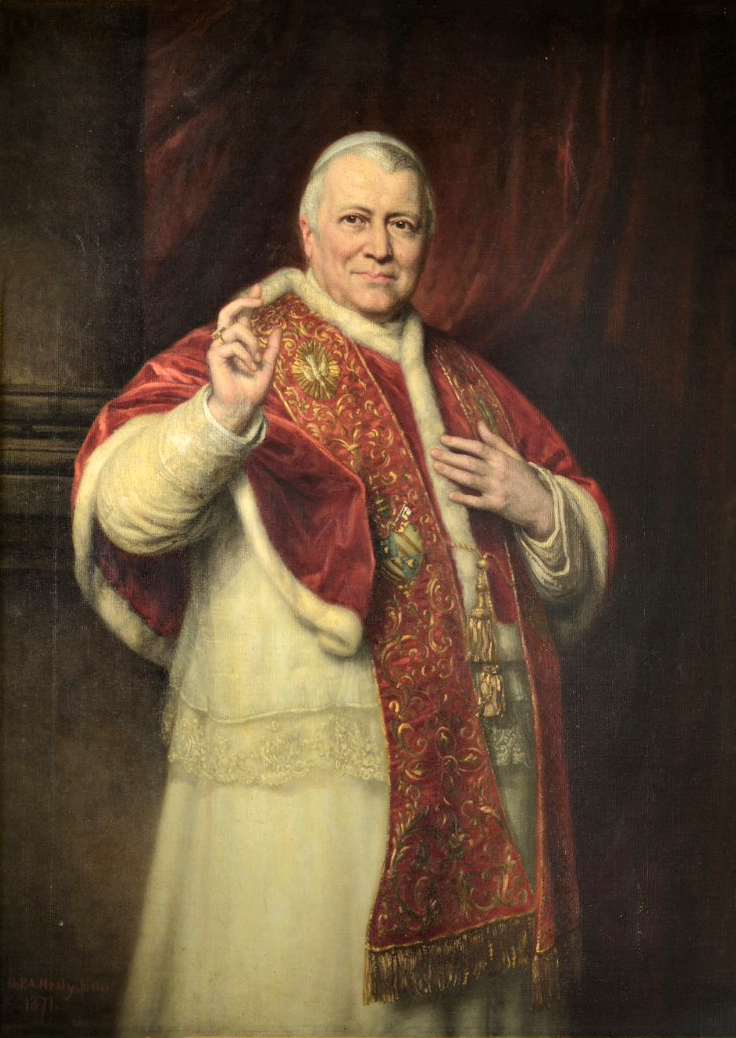
Pope Pius IX.

The corresponding indulgences granted by Pope Pius IX were superseded by the 1968 Enchiridion Indulgentiarum. Although the chaplet is not specifically mentioned in either the Enchiridion or the later Directory on Popular Piety and the Liturgy, the Enchiridion provides:

- "35. Use of Articles of Devotion. (Verbatim follows:) “The faithful, who devoutly use an article of devotion (crucifix or cross, rosary, scapular or medal) properly blessed by any priest, obtain a partial indulgence..." and
- "54. Veneration of the Saints. Partial indulgence granted to those who on the feast of any Saint recite in his honor the oration of the Missal or any other approved by legitimate Authority."

== See also ==
- Saint Michael in the Catholic Church
- Scapular of Saint Michael the Archangel
- Novena to Saint Michael
- Angels – Supernatural being in religions and mythologies
