= Vespro della Beata Vergine =

Musical composition by Claudio Monteverdi

- Vespers by Claudio Monteverdi
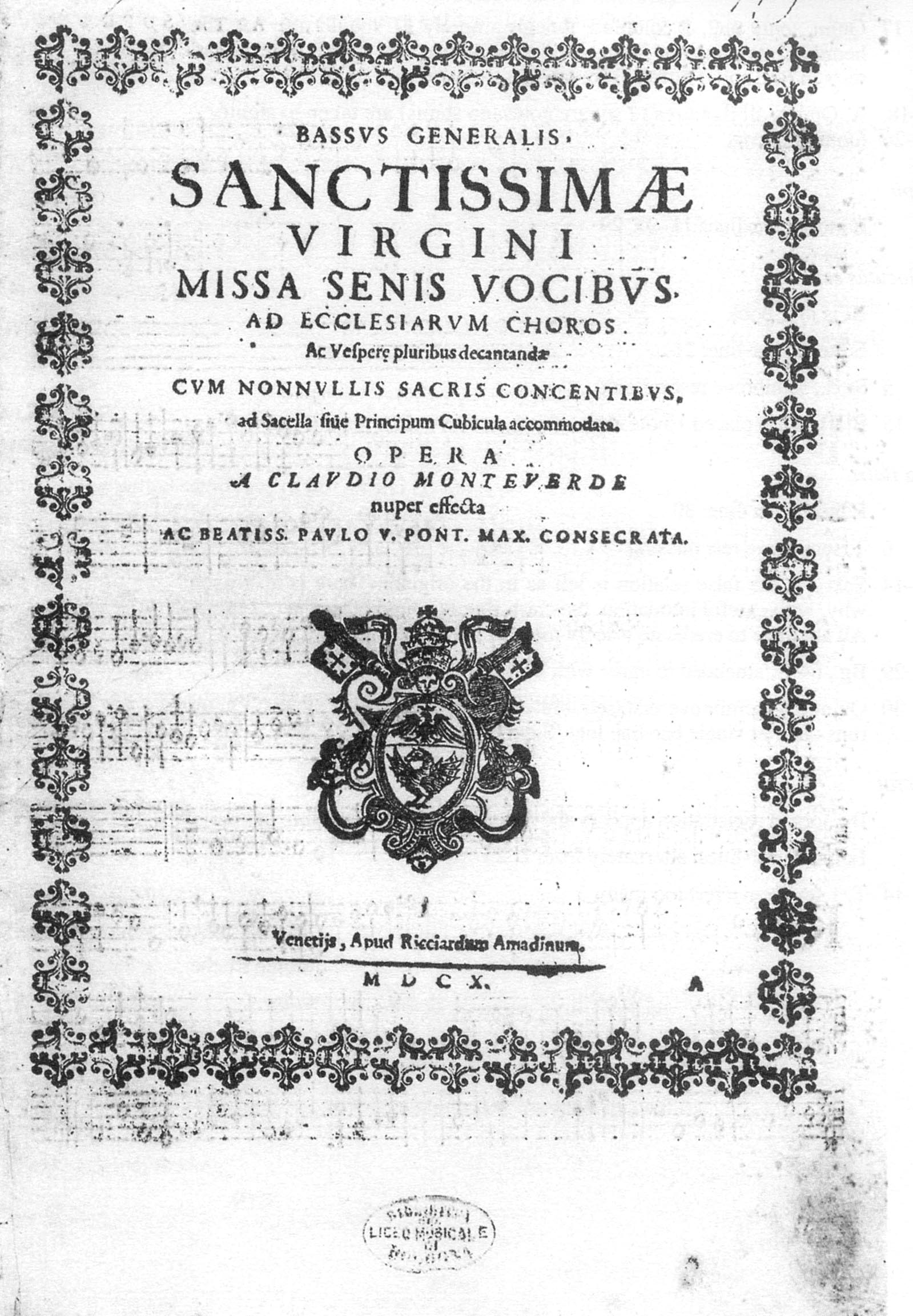
- Title page of the "Bassus Generalis" for one of the partbooks in which the Vespers were published in 1610
- English: Vespers for the Blessed Virgin
- Catalogue: SV 206 and 206a
- Text: Biblical and liturgical, including several psalms, a litany, a hymn, and Magnificat
- Language: Latin
- Dedication: Pope Paul V
- Published: 1610 in Venice
- Duration: 90 minutes
- Scoring: Soloists; choirs; orchestra

Vespro della Beata Vergine (Vespers for the Blessed Virgin), SV 206, is a musical setting by Claudio Monteverdi of the evening vespers on Marian feasts, scored for soloists, choirs, and orchestra. It is an ambitious work in scope and in its variety of style and scoring, and has a duration of around 90 minutes. Published in Venice (with a dedication to Pope Paul V dated 1 September 1610) as Sanctissimae Virgini Missa senis vocibus ac Vesperae pluribus decantandae, cum nonnullis sacris concentibus, ad Sacella sive Principum Cubicula accommodata ("Mass for the Most Holy Virgin for six voices, and Vespers for several voices with some sacred songs, suitable for chapels and ducal chambers"), it is sometimes called Monteverdi's Vespers of 1610.

Monteverdi composed the music while musician and composer for the Gonzagas, the dukes of Mantua. The libretto is compiled from several Latin Biblical and liturgical texts. The thirteen movements include the introductory Deus in adiutorium, five Psalms, four concertato motets and a vocal sonata on the "Sancta Maria" litany, several differently scored stanzas of the hymn "Ave maris stella", and a choice of two Magnificats. A church performance would have included antiphons in Gregorian chant for the specific feast day. The composition demonstrates Monteverdi's ability to assimilate both the new seconda pratica, such as in the emerging opera, and the old style of the prima pratica, building psalms and Magnificat on the traditional plainchant as a cantus firmus. The composition is scored for up to ten vocal parts and instruments including cornettos, violins, viole da braccio, and basso continuo. Monteverdi travelled to Rome to deliver the composition to the Pope in person, and a partbook is held by the Vatican Library.

No performance during the composer's lifetime can be positively identified from surviving documents, (Note: Constantijn Huygens heard a Vespers by Monteverdi, but on St. John's Day.) though parts of the work might have been performed at the ducal chapels in Mantua and at San Marco in Venice, where the composer became director of music in 1613. The work received renewed attention from musicologists and performers in the 20th century. They have discussed whether it is a planned composition in a modern sense or a collection of music suitable for Vespers, and have debated the role of the added movements, instrumentation, keys and other issues of historically informed performance. The first recording of excerpts from the Vespers was released in 1953; many recordings that followed presented all the music printed in 1610. In some recordings and performances, antiphons for a given occasion of the church year are added to create a liturgical vespers service, while others strictly present only the printed music. Monteverdi's Vespers are regarded as a unique milestone of music history, at the transition from Renaissance to Baroque.

== History and context ==
=== Monteverdi in Mantua ===
Monteverdi, who was born in Cremona in 1567, was a court musician for the Gonzaga dukes of Mantua from 1590 to 1612. He began as a viol player under Duke Vincenzo Gonzaga and advanced to become maestro della musica in late 1601. He was responsible for the duke's sacred and secular music, in regular church services and soirées on Fridays, and for extraordinary events. While Monteverdi was court musician in Mantua, the opera genre emerged, first as entertainment for nobility, to become public musical theatre later. The first work now considered as an opera is Jacopo Peri's Dafne of 1597. In the new genre, a complete story was told through characters; as well as choruses and ensembles, the vocal parts included recitative, aria, and arioso. Monteverdi's first opera was L'Orfeo, which premiered in 1607. The duke was quick to recognise the potential of this new musical form for bringing prestige to those willing to sponsor it.

Monteverdi wrote the movements of the Vespers piece by piece, while responsible for the ducal services which were held at the Santa Croce chapel at the palace. He completed the large-scale work in 1610. He possibly composed the Vespers aspiring to a better position, and the work demonstrates his abilities as a composer in a great variety of styles. The setting was Monteverdi's first published sacred composition after his initial publications nearly thirty years before and stands out for its assimilation of both the old and the new styles.

=== Vespers ===
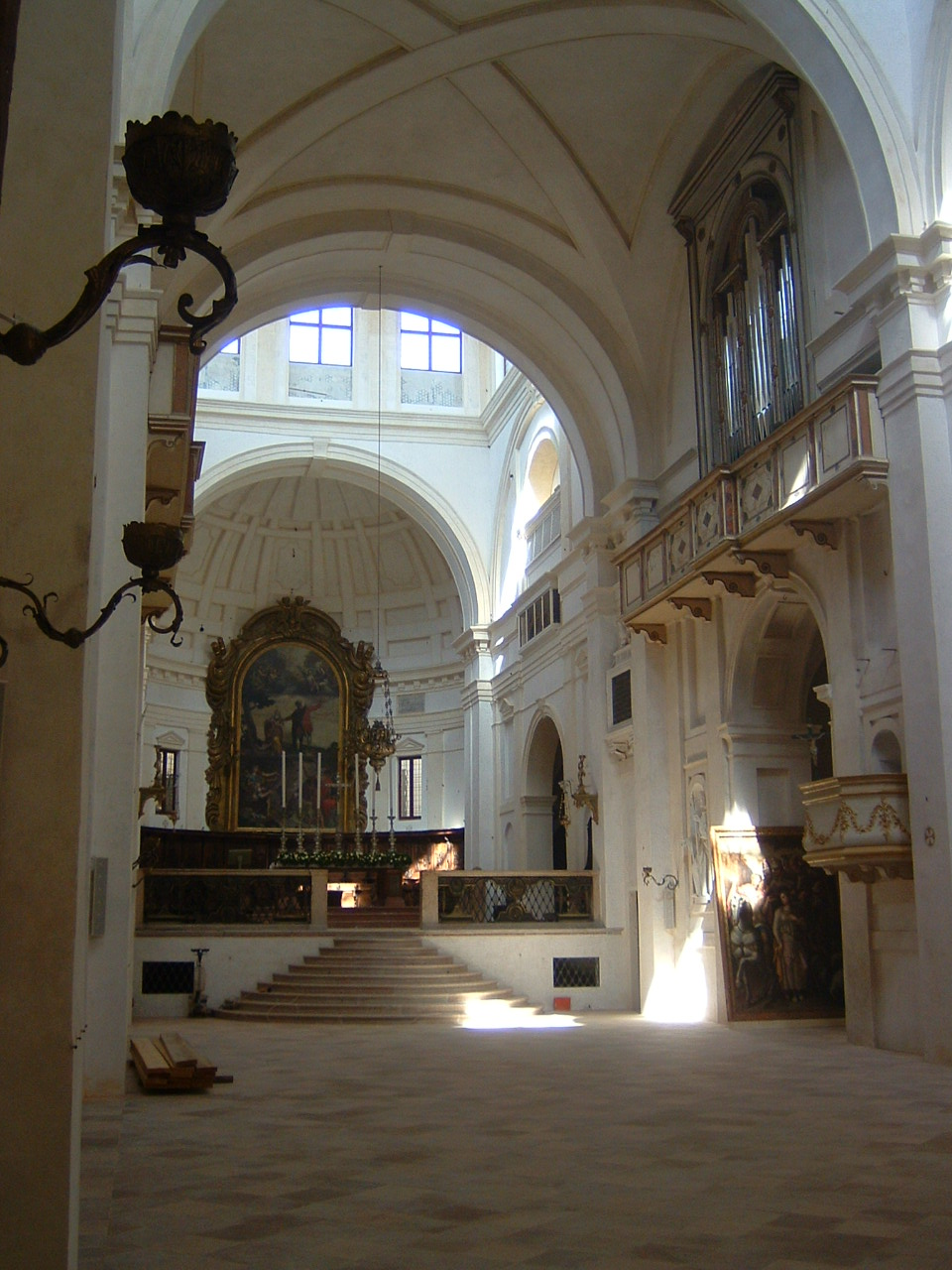
The basilica of St. Barbara, the ducal palace church at Mantua

The liturgical vespers is an evening prayer service according to the Catholic Officium Divinum (Divine Office). At Monteverdi's time, it was sung in Latin, as were all Catholic services then. A vespers service at the time contained five psalms, a hymn and the Magnificat (Mary's song of praise). The five psalms for Marian feasts (as well as other female saints) begin with Psalm 110 in Hebrew counting, but known to Monteverdi as Psalmus 109 in the numbering of the Vulgate:

Psalm	Latin	English
Psalm 110	Dixit Dominus	The LORD said unto my Lord
Psalm 113	Laudate pueri	Praise ye [the Lord, O ye] servants of the Lord
Psalm 122	Laetatus sum	I was glad
Psalm 127	Nisi Dominus	Except the Lord [build the house]
Psalm 147	Lauda Jerusalem	Praise, Jerusalem

The individual psalms and the Magnificat are concluded by the doxology Gloria Patri. The hymn for Marian feasts was "Ave maris stella". Variable elements, changing with the liturgical occasion, are antiphons, inserted before each psalm and the Magnificat, which reflect the specific feast and connect the Old Testament psalms to Christian theology. Vespers are traditionally framed by the opening versicle and response from Psalm 70, and the closing blessing.

On ordinary Sundays, the vespers service might be sung in Gregorian chant, while on high holidays, such as the feast day of a patron saint, elaborate concertante music was preferred. In his Vespers, Monteverdi may have offered such music without necessarily expecting that all of it would be performed in a given service.

Monteverdi deviated from the typical vespers liturgy by adding motets (concerti or sacri concentus) between the psalms. Scholars debate if they were meant to replace antiphons or rather as embellishments of the preceding psalm. Monteverdi also included a Marian litany, "Sancta Maria, ora pro nobis" (Holy Mary, pray for us). All liturgical texts are set using their psalm tones in Gregorian chant, often as a cantus firmus.

Graham Dixon suggests the setting is more suited for the feast of Saint Barbara, claiming, for example, that the texts from the Song of Songs are applicable to any female saint but that a dedication to fit a Marian feast made the work more "marketable". There are just two Marian songs in the whole work ("Audi coelum" and "Ave maris stella"); and the sonata could easily be rearranged to any saint's name.

=== First publication ===
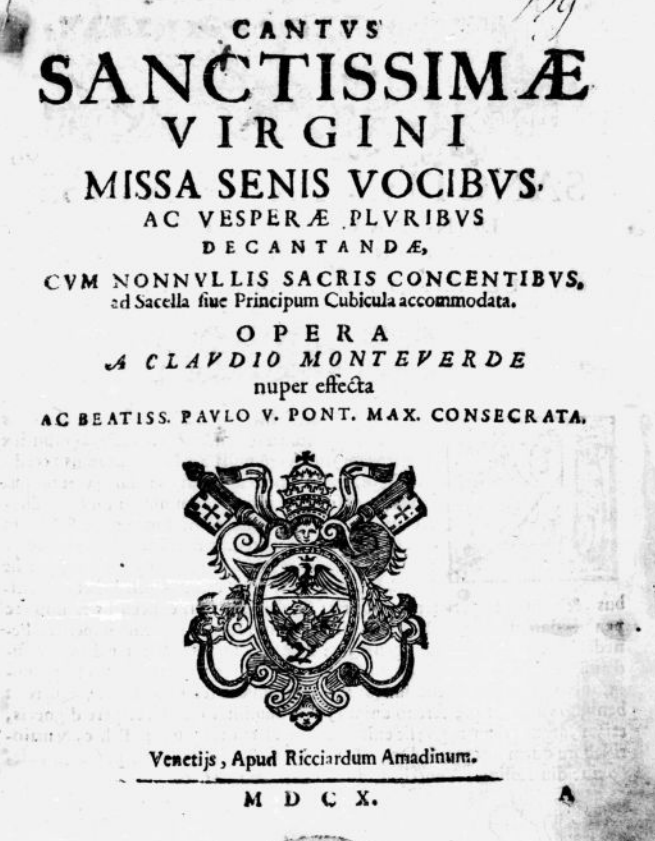
Title page of the partbook for Cantus (soprano)

The first mention of the work's publication is in a July 1610 letter by Monteverdi's assistant, Bassano Casola, to Cardinal Ferdinando Gonzaga, the duke's younger son. Casola described that two compositions were in the process to be printed, a six-part mass (Messa da Capella) on motifs from Nicolas Gombert's In illo tempore, and psalms for a vespers setting for the Virgin (Salmi del Vespro della Madonna). He described the psalms as "varying and diverse inventions and harmonies over a canto fermo" (cantus firmus), and noted that Monteverdi would travel to Rome to personally dedicate the publication to the Pope in the autumn.

The printing was completed in Venice, then an important centre for music printing. The printing of collections of sacred music in Italy at the period has been described as "a fast-growing and very large and lucrative market", with around 50 collections in 1610 alone, 36 of them for offices such as Vespers. The publisher was Ricciardo Amadino, who had published Monteverdi's opera L'Orfeo in 1609. While the opera was published as a score, the Vespers music appeared as a set of partbooks. It was published together with Monteverdi's mass Missa in illo tempore. The cover describes both works: "Sanctissimae Virgini Missa senis vocibus ad ecclesiarum choros, ac Vespere pluribus decantandae cum nonnullis sacris concentibus ad Sacella sive Principum Cubicula accommodata" (Mass for the Most Holy Virgin for six voices for church choirs, and vespers for several voices with some sacred songs, suitable for chapels and ducal chambers).

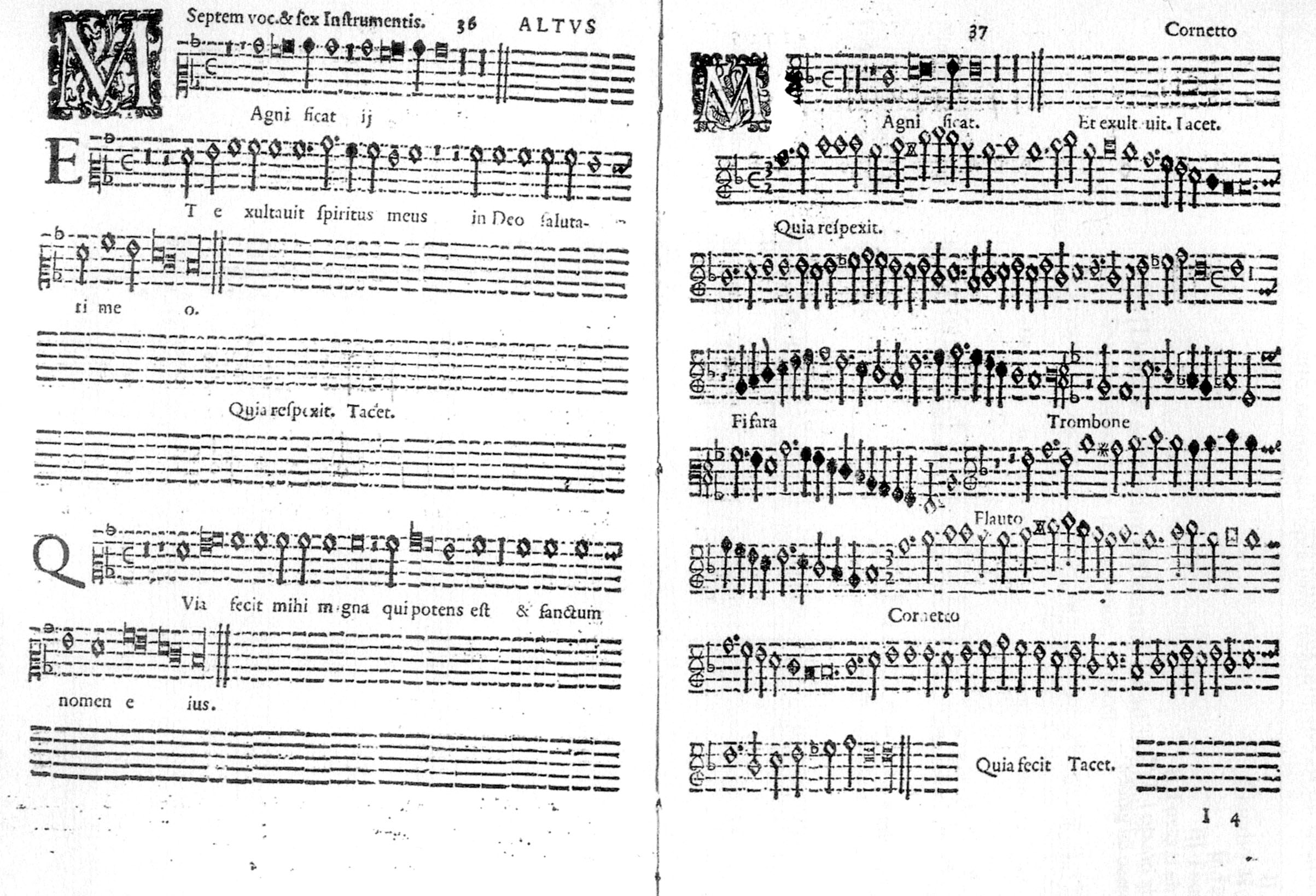
From the Magnificat, a page from the alto partbook (short score), the voice part left and continuo part right

One of the partbooks contains the basso continuo and provides a kind of short score for the more complicated movements: it gives the title of the Vespers as: "Vespro della Beata Vergine da concerto composta sopra canti firmi" (Vesper for the Blessed Virgin for concertos, composed on cantus firmi).

Monteverdi's notation is still in the style of Renaissance music, for example regarding the duration of notes and the absence of bar lines. There is no score, but a partbook for each voice and instrument. The corresponding continuo notes the beginnings of text lines, for example Magnificat, "Et exultauit", "Quia respexit" and "Quia fecit", and the names of instruments, for example cornetto, trombone and flauto. The initials of a title are embellished, such as the M of Magnificat, and in the voice part, the initials of a cantus firmus line begin with a larger letter, e.g. "E t exultauit ..." and "Q uia respexit ...". Sections where the voice or instrument is silent are marked "Tacet.". The notation poses challenges to editors adopting the current system of notation, which was established about a half-century after Vespers was written.

Monteverdi dedicated the work to Pope Paul V, who had recently visited Mantua, and dated the dedication 1 September 1610. The schedule seems to have resulted in some of the movements being printed in haste and some corrections had to be made. Monteverdi visited Rome, as anticipated, in October 1610 and it is likely that he delivered a copy to the Pope, given that the Papal Library holds an alto partbook. It is not clear whether he was honoured with a papal audience. The alto partbook which the Pope received, with hand-written corrections, survived in the Biblioteca Doria Pamphilij.

Monteverdi later wrote further music for vespers services, in the collection Selva morale e spirituale, published in 1641, and in another collection, Messa e Salmi (Mass and Psalms) which was published after his death in 1650. There is no indication that any of his publications of sacred music received a second edition.

=== Later publication ===
After the original print, the next time parts from the Vespers were published was in an 1834 book by Carl von Winterfeld devoted to the music of Giovanni Gabrieli. He chose the beginning of the Dixit Dominus and of the Deposuit from the Magnificat, discussing the variety of styles in detail. Luigi Torchi published the Sonata as the first complete movement from the Vespers at the turn of the 20th century. The first modern edition of the Vespers appeared in 1932 as part of Gian Francesco Malipiero's edition of Monteverdi's complete works. Two years later, Hans F. Redlich published an edition which dropped two psalms, arranged the other movements in different order, and implemented the figured bass in a complicated way. In 1966, Gottfried Wolters edited the first critical edition. Critical editions were published by, among others, Clifford Bartlett in 1986, Jerome Roche in 1994, and Uwe Wolf in 2013, while Antonio Delfino has edited the Vespers for a complete edition of the composer's works.

=== Performance ===
The historical record does not indicate whether Monteverdi actually performed the Vespers in Mantua or in Rome, where he was not offered a post. He assumed the position of maestro di cappella at the Basilica di San Marco in Venice in 1613 and a performance there seems likely. Church music in Venice is well documented and performers can draw information for historically informed performances from that knowledge, for example that Monteverdi expected a choir of all male voices.

The Vespers is monumental in scale and requires a choir of ten or more vocal parts split into separate choirs, and seven soloists. Solo instrumental parts are written for violin and cornetto. Antiphons preceding each psalm and the Magnificat, sung in plainchant, would vary with the occasion. Some scholars have argued that the Vespers was not intended as a single work but rather as a collection to choose from.

The edition by Hans Redlich was the basis for performances in Zurich in February 1935 and of parts in New York in 1937, followed by Switzerland (mid-1940s), Brussels (1946) and London (on 14 May 1946 at Westminster Central Hall). It was printed in 1949 and used for the first recording in 1953. The first recording of the work with added antiphons was conducted in 1966 by Jürgen Jürgens. More recent performances have usually aimed to provide the complete music Monteverdi published.

== Music ==
=== Structure ===
Vespro della Beata Vergine is made up of 13 sections. The "Ave maris stella" is in seven stanzas set to different scoring, with interspersed ritornelli. The Magnificat is in twelve movements, which Monteverdi wrote in two versions.

The following table shows the section numbers according to the 2013 edition by Carus, then the function of the section within the Vespers, its text source, and the beginning of the text both in Latin and in English. The column for the voices has abbreviations SATB for soprano, alto, tenor, and bass. A repeated letter means the voice part is divided, for example TT means "tenor 1 and tenor 2". The column for instruments often contains only their number, because Monteverdi did not always specify the instruments. The continuo plays throughout but is listed below (as "continuo") only when it has a role independent of the other instruments or voices. The last column lists the page number of the beginning of the section in the Carus edition.

No.	Part	Text source	Incipit	English	Voices	Instruments	Page
1	Versicle & Response	Psalm 70:1	Deus in adjutorium meum intende	O God, come to my aid	T SSATTB	6	1
2	Psalm	Psalm 110	Dixit Dominus	The LORD said unto my Lord	SSATTB	6	7
3	Motet	Song of Songs	Nigra sum	I am black	T	continuo	18
4	Psalm	Psalm 113	Laudate pueri	Praise, ye servants of the Lord	SSAATTBB	organ	20
5	Motet	Song of Songs	Pulchra es	You are beautiful	2S	continuo	36
6	Psalm	Psalm 122	Laetatus sum	I was glad	SSATTB		38
7	Motet	Isaiah 6:2–3; 1 John 5:7	Duo Seraphim	Two seraphim	3T	continuo	49
8	Psalm	Psalm 127	Nisi Dominus	Except the Lord	SATB 2T SATB		53
9	Motet	Anonymous poem	Audi coelum	Hear my words, Heaven	2T	continuo	67
10	Psalm	Psalm 147	Lauda Jerusalem	Praise, Jerusalem	SAB T SAB		73
11	Sonata	Marian litany	Sancta Maria	Holy Mary	S	8	84
12	Hymnus	hymn	Ave maris stella	Hail Star of the Sea	SSAATTBB		106
13	Magnificat	Luke 2:46–55; Doxology	Magnificat	[My soul] magnifies [the Lord]	SSATTBB		114

=== Sections ===
==== 1 Deus in adjutorium meum intende/Domine ad adjuvandum me festina ====
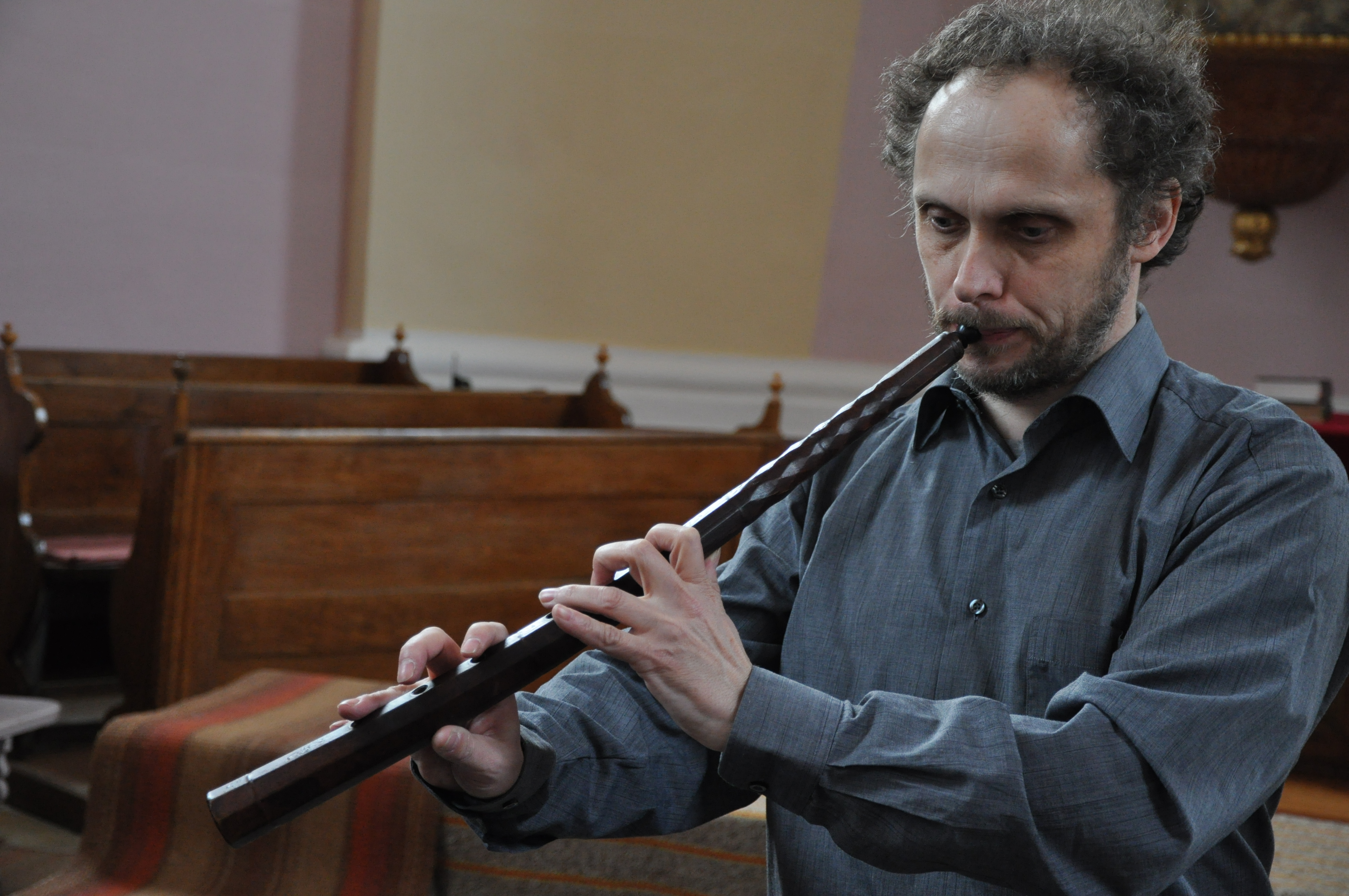
Cornetto player

The work opens with the traditional versicle and response for vespers services, the beginning of Psalm 70 (Psalm 69 in the Vulgate), Deus in adjutorium meum intende (Make haste, O God, to deliver me). It is sung by a solo tenor, with the response from the same verse, Domine ad adjuvandum me festina (Make haste to help me, O LORD), sung by a six-part choir. The movement is accompanied by a six-part orchestra with two cornettos, three trombones (which double the lower strings), strings, and continuo.

Part	Text source	Incipit	English	Voices	Instruments
Versicle	Psalm 70:1	Deus in adjutorium meum intende	Make haste, O God, to deliver me	T	6
Response	Psalm 70:1	Domine ad adjuvandum me festina	Make haste to help me, O LORD	SSATTB	6

Deus in adiutorium

The music is based on the opening toccata from Monteverdi's 1607 opera L'Orfeo, to which the choir sings a falsobordone (a style of recitation) on the same chord. The music has been described as "a call to attention" and "a piece whose brilliance is only matched by the audacity of its conception".

==== 2 Dixit Dominus ====
The first psalm, Psalm 110, begins with Dixit Dominus Dominum meum (The LORD said unto my Lord). Monteverdi set it for a six-part choir with divided sopranos and tenors, and six instruments, prescribing sex vocibus & sex instrumentis. The first tenor begins alone with the cantus firmus. The beginnings of verses are often in falsobordone recitation, leading to six-part polyphonic settings.

==== 3 Nigra sum ====
The first motet begins Nigra sum, sed formosa (I am black, but beautiful), from the Song of Songs 1:4. It is written for tenor solo in the new style of monody (a melodic solo line with accompaniment).

==== 4 Laudate pueri ====
Laudate pueri

Psalm 113 begins Laudate pueri Dominum (literally: 'Praise, children, the Lord'; in the KJV: 'Praise ye the Lord, O ye servants of the Lord'), and contains eight vocal parts and continuo. The second tenor begins alone with the cantus firmus.

==== 5 Pulchra es ====
The second motet begins Pulchra es (You are beautiful) from the Song of Songs. Monteverdi set it for two sopranos, who often sing in third parallels.

==== 6 Laetatus sum ====
The third psalm is Psalm 122, beginning Laetatus sum (literally: 'I was glad'), a pilgrimage psalm. The music begins with a walking bass, which the first tenor enters with the cantus firmus. The movement is based on four patterns in the bass line and includes complex polyphonic settings and duets.

==== 7 Duo Seraphim ====
The third motet begins Duo Seraphim (Two angels were calling one to the other), a text combined from Isaiah 6:2–3 and the First Epistle of John, 5:7. Monteverdi set it for three tenors. The first part, talking about the two angels, is a duet. When the text turns to the epistle mentioning the Trinity, the third tenor joins. They sing the text "these three are one" in unison. The vocal lines are highly ornamented.

==== 8 Nisi Dominus ====
The fourth psalm, Psalm 127, opens with the words Nisi Dominus (Except the Lord [build the house]), and is for two tenors singing the cantus firmus and two four-part choirs, one echoing the other in overlapped singing.

==== 9 Audi coelum ====
The fourth motet opens with the words Audi coelum verba mea (Hear my words, Heaven), based on an anonymous liturgical poem. It is set for two tenors, who sing in call and response (prima ad una voce sola), and expands to six voices at the word omnes (all).

==== 10 Lauda Jerusalem ====
The fifth psalm, Psalm 147, begins Lauda Jerusalem (Praise, Jerusalem), and is set for two three-part choirs (SAB) and tenors singing the cantus firmus.

==== 11 Sonata sopra Sancta Maria ====
The sonata is an instrumental movement with soprano singing of a cantus firmus from the Litany of Loreto (Sancta Maria, ora pro nobis – Holy Mary, pray for us), with rhythmic variants. The movement opens with an instrumental section comparable to a pair of pavane and galliard, the same material first in even metre, then in triple metre. The vocal line appears eleven times, while the instruments play uninterrupted virtuoso music reminiscent of vocal parts in the motets.

==== 12 Hymnus: Ave maris stella ====
Gregorian chant of "Ave maris stella"

The penultimate section is devoted to the 8th century Marian hymn "Ave maris stella". Its seven stanzas are set in different scoring. The melody is in the soprano in all verses except verse 6, which is for tenor solo. Verse 1 is a seven-part setting. Verses 2 and 3 are the same vocal four-part setting, verse 2 for choir 1, verse 3 for choir 3. Similarly, verses 4 and 5 are set for soprano, first soprano 1, then soprano 2. Verses 1 to 5 are all followed by the same ritornello for five instruments. Verse 7 is the same choral setting as verse 1, followed by Amen.

Movements of "Ave maris stella"
No.	Part	Incipit	English	Voices	Instruments	Page
12a	Versus 1	Ave maris stella	Hail Star of the Sea	SSAATTBB		106
12b	Versus 2	Sumens illud Ave	Receiving that Ave	SATB		108
12c	Ritornello				5	109
12d	Versus 3	Solve vincla reis	Loosen the chains of the guilty	SATB		110
12e	Ritornello				5	110
12f	Versus 4	Monstra te esse matrem	Show thyself to be a Mother	S		111
12g	Ritornello				5	111
12h	Versus 5	Virgo singularis	Unique Virgin	S		111
12i	Ritornello				5	111
12j	Versus 6	Vita praeasta puram	Bestow a pure life	T		111
12k	Versus 7	Sit laus Deo Patri; Amen	Praise be to God the Father; Amen	SSAATTBB		112

The hymn setting has been regarded as conservative, the chant melody in the upper voice throughout, but variety is achieved by different numbers of voices and interspersion of a ritornello. The instruments are not specified, to provide further variety. The last stanza repeats the first for formal symmetry.

==== 13 Magnificat ====
The last movement of a vespers service is the Magnificat. Monteverdi devotes a movement to every verse of the canticle, and two to the doxology. Depending on the mood of the text, the Magnificat is scored for a choir of up to seven voices, in solo, duo, or trio singing. Monteverdi uses the Magnificat tone in every movement, a tone similar to the psalm tones but with an initium (beginning) which provides the possibility of more harmonic variety.

The publication contains a second setting of the Magnificat for six voices and continuo accompaniment.

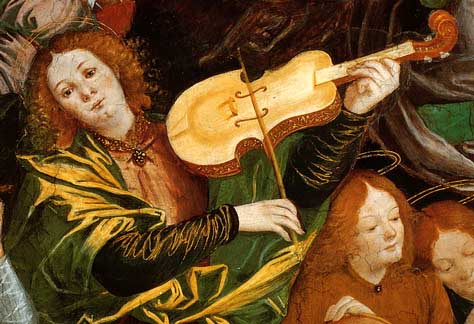
Viola da braccio on a fresco by Gaudenzio Ferrari in Santa Maria dei Miracoli, c. 1535

Movements of the Magnificat
No.	Text source	Incipit	Voices	Instruments	Page
13a	Luke 1:46	Magnificat	SSATTBB	6	114
13b	Luke 1:47	Et exultavit	A T T		116
13c	Luke 1:48	Quia respexit	T	cornettos, violins, viola da braccio	118
13d	Luke 1:49	Quia fecit	A B B	violins	122
13e	Luke 1:50	Et misericordia	SSATBB		124
13f	Luke 1:51	Fecit potentiam	A	violins, viola da braccio	126
13g	Luke 1:52	Deposuit potentes	T	cornettos	128
13h	Luke 1:53	Esurientes implevit bonis	S S	cornettos, violins, viola da braccio	130
13i	Luke 1:54	Suscepit Israel	S S T		132
13j	Luke 1:55	Sicut locutus est	A	cornettos, violins	133
13k	Doxology	Gloria Patri	S T T		136
13l	Doxology	Sicut erat in principio	SSATTBB	all instruments	138

== Analysis ==
Monteverdi achieved a collection of great variety both in style and structure, which was unique at the time. Styles range from chordal falsobordone to virtuoso singing, from recitative to polyphonic setting of many voices, and from continuo accompaniment to extensive instrumental obbligato. Structurally, he demonstrated different organisation in all movements.

John Butt, who conducted a recording in 2017 with the Dunedin Consort using one voice per part, summarised the many styles:

... polychoral textures, virtuoso vocal coloratura, madrigalian vocal polyphony and expressive solo monody and duets, together with some of the most ambitious instrumental music to date. Yet the whole work is suffused with references to the church at its most traditional, with Monteverdi's incessant use of the Gregorian psalm tones for the five extensive psalm settings, the seven-part Magnificat, ... the chant for the Litany, which is integrated within an exuberant instrumental sonata, and the multi-verse setting of the Latin hymn "Ave maris stella".

Butt described the first three psalms as radical in style, while the other two rather follow the polychoral style of Gabrieli, suggesting that the first three may have been composed especially with the publication in mind.

The musicologist Jeffrey Kurtzman observed that the five free concertos (or motets) follow a scheme to first increase then decrease the number of singers, from one to three and back to one, but they increase the number of performers from the first to the last, adding more voices at the end of the fourth and having eight instruments play for the last. In prints by other composers, such concertos appear as a group, usually sorted by number of voices, while Monteverdi interspersed them with the psalms.

In Monteverdi's time, it was common to improvise and make adjustments during performances, depending on the acoustics and the availability and capability of performers. The print of his Vespers shows unusual detail in reducing this freedom, for example, by precise notation of embellishments and even organ registration.

== Recordings ==
The first recording of the Vespers was arguably an American performance in 1952, featuring musicians from the University of Illinois conducted by Leopold Stokowski. The recording was released in LP format, probably in 1953, but appears not to have been commercially distributed. The work has since been recorded many times in several versions, involving both modern and period instruments. Some recordings allocate the voice parts to choirs, while others use the "one voice per part" concept.

In 1964, John Eliot Gardiner assembled a group of musicians to perform the work in King's College Chapel, Cambridge. The event became the birth of the later Monteverdi Choir. Gardiner recorded the Vespers twice, in 1974 and in 1989.

Although some musicologists argue that Monteverdi was offering a compendium of music for vespers services from which a selection could be made, most recordings present the composition as a unified work, deciding which of the two versions of scoring to perform. (Note: It is assumed that the Magnificat with continuo accompaniment was an alternative for those musical groups lacking the resources to perform the lavishly scored version. Among the recordings of the Vespers, Peter Seymour's is unusual for choosing the Magnificat with continuo.) Recordings differ in presenting strictly what Monteverdi composed, or in liturgical context, with added antiphons for a specific feast day. In his 2005 version, Paul McCreesh also included music from other publications and changed the order of several movements.

== Modern reception ==
Kurtzman, who edited a publication of the work for Oxford University Press, notes: "... it seems as if Monteverdi were intent in displaying his skills in virtually all contemporary styles of composition, using every modern structural technique". Monteverdi achieved overall unity by using the Gregorian plainchant as a cantus firmus, for the beginning, the psalms, the litany and the Magnificat. This "rigorous adhesion to the psalm tones" is similar to the style of Giovanni Giacomo Gastoldi, who was choirmaster at the Basilica palatina di Santa Barbara at the ducal palace in Mantua. Whenham summarised about the use of chant:

It allowed him to show that such settings, though conservative at base, could incorporate thoroughly up-to-date elements of musical style. And, perhaps not least, it helped him solve a problem inherent in setting the psalms and Magnificat – that of achieving musical coherence when working with texts that were sometimes long and unwieldy and certainly not designed for setting by an early seventeenth-century madrigalist.

Musicologists have debated topics such as the role of the sacri concentus and sonata, instrumentation, keys (chiavette), and issues of historically informed performance.

The musicologist Tim Carter summarised in his entry for the composer for Grove in 2007: "His three major collections of liturgical and devotional music transcend the merely functional, exploiting a rich panoply of text-expressive and contrapuntal-structural techniques." Kurtzmann concluded from his detailed research of Monteverdi's Vespro della Beata Vergine and contemporary sacred music:

Monteverdi's objective was clearly to carry to new heights the Renaissance concept of varietas and to provide as many forms of musical splendour as he could muster. In this respect his collection of vesper music goes far beyond any other publication of sacred music of his day.
