= Chaplet (prayer) =

Christian prayer which uses prayer beads

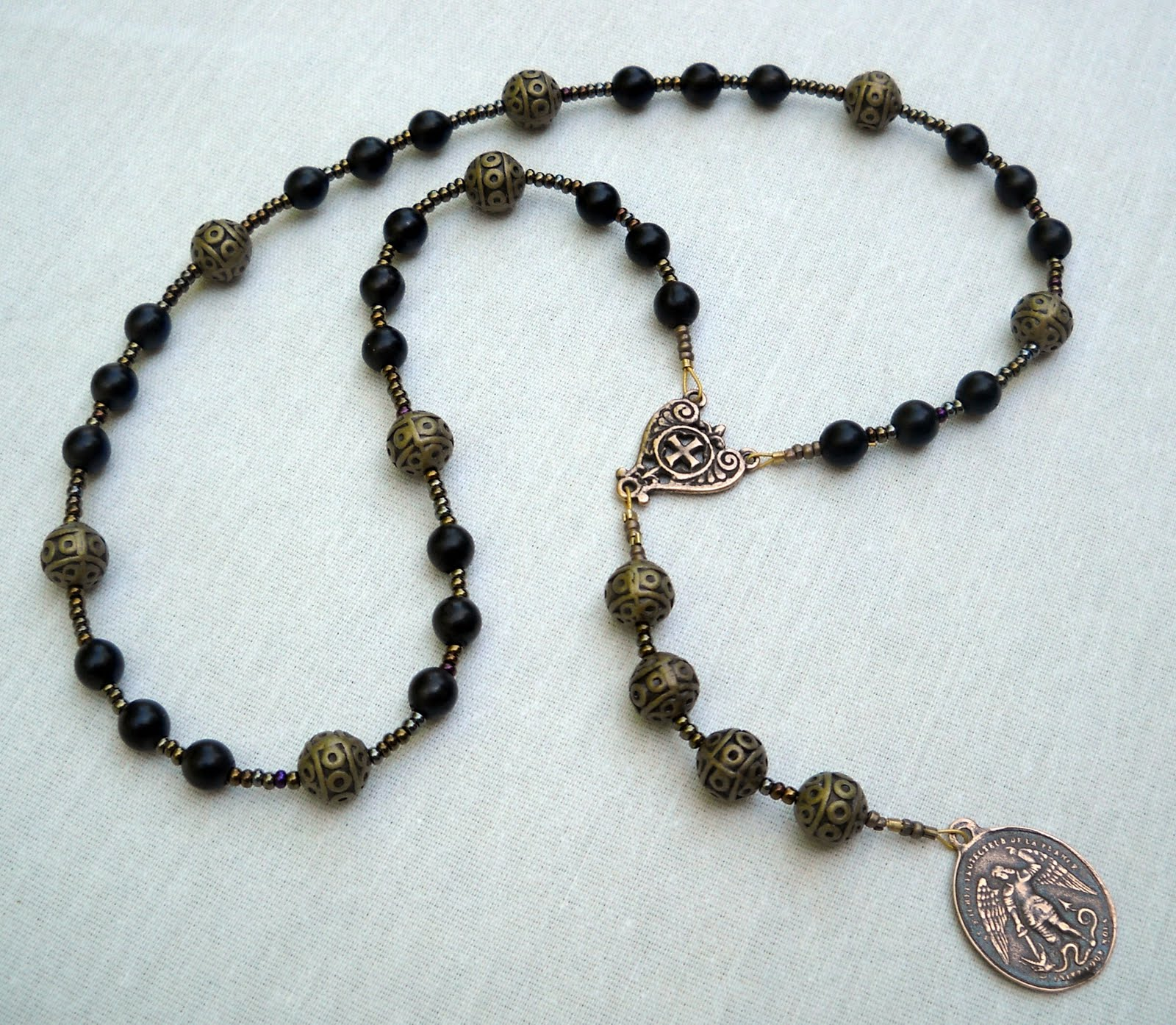
This Chaplet of St Michael has beads to indicate the prayers of the chaplet, and a medal with a picture of St Michael.

A chaplet is a form of Christian prayer which uses prayer beads, and which is similar to but distinct from the Rosary. Some chaplets have a strong Marian element, others focus more directly on Jesus Christ and his Divine Attributes (the Divine Mercy Chaplet), or one of the many saints, such as the Chaplet of St Michael. Chaplets are "personal devotionals" and depending on the origins, each one of the chaplets may vary considerably. In the Roman Catholic Church, while the usual five-decade Dominican rosary is also considered to be a chaplet, the other chaplets often have fewer beads and decades than a traditional rosary and may use a different set of prayers. In the Anglican Communion, a chaplet often includes one week of the Anglican rosary.

== Common chaplets ==
Common chaplets include:

- Blessed Sacrament Beads
- Chaplet of the Divine Mercy, using ordinary rosary beads of five decades.
- Chaplet of the Five Wounds of Jesus
- Chaplet of the Holy Wounds, based on the reported visions of Marie Martha Chambon
- Little Crown of the Infant Jesus, made up of three and twelve beads.
- Chaplet of the Sacred Heart, consisting of thirty-three small beads, six large beads, a centerpiece, a crucifix and a Sacred Heart medal.
- Little Chaplet of the Holy Face, to honor the Five Wounds of Jesus Christ, composed of a cross and six large beads and thirty-three small.
- Chaplet of the Precious Blood, consisting of thirty-three beads in seven groups, was composed by Dom Francesco Albertini, founder of the Archconfraternity of the Most Precious Blood.
- Chaplet of Our Lady of Tears, based on the reported visions of the nun Amalia of Jesus Flagellated
- Chaplet of Black Madonna of Częstochowa, made up of nine beads with a crucifix and a medal of Our Lady of Czestochowa.
- Chaplet of Our Lady, Star of the Sea, consisting of a medal of Our Lady of Mount Carmel, three separate beads, and twelve additional beads.
- Chaplet of the Immaculate Conception, also called the Crown of Stars, consisting of three groups of four beads, with a medal of the Immaculate Conception.
- Chaplet or Rosary of the Seven Sorrows of Mary, made up of seven groups of seven beads. Also known as the Dolour beads.
- Chaplet of Saint Joseph, which is divided into fifteen groups of four beads consisting of one white and three purple beads.
- Chaplet of Saint Kateri Tekakwitha, composed of eight brown, eight red and eight crystal beads.
- Chaplet of Saint Anthony, made up of thirteen sets of three beads.
- Chaplet of Saint Patrick, made up of twelve beads symbolizing the twelve perils of Saint Patrick
- Chaplet of Saint Philomena, consisting of three white beads and thirteen red beads.
- Bridgettine Rosary, consisting of six decades of ten beads each. There are three additional beads at the end.
- Little Flower Chaplet, made of one large bead and twenty-four smaller beads.
- Chaplet of the Way of the Cross, made of fifteen groups of three beads, etc.
- Chaplet in Honor of the Holy Infant of Good Health, said on the standard Dominican rosary.
- Chaplet of Saint Michael the Archangel, comprising nine groups of four beads each, consisting of three Hail Marys and one Our Father in each. (Each of the nine groups is said in honor of one of the nine choirs of angels.)
- Chaplet of Saint Anna Schäffer, made of one large bead and twenty-four smaller beads.
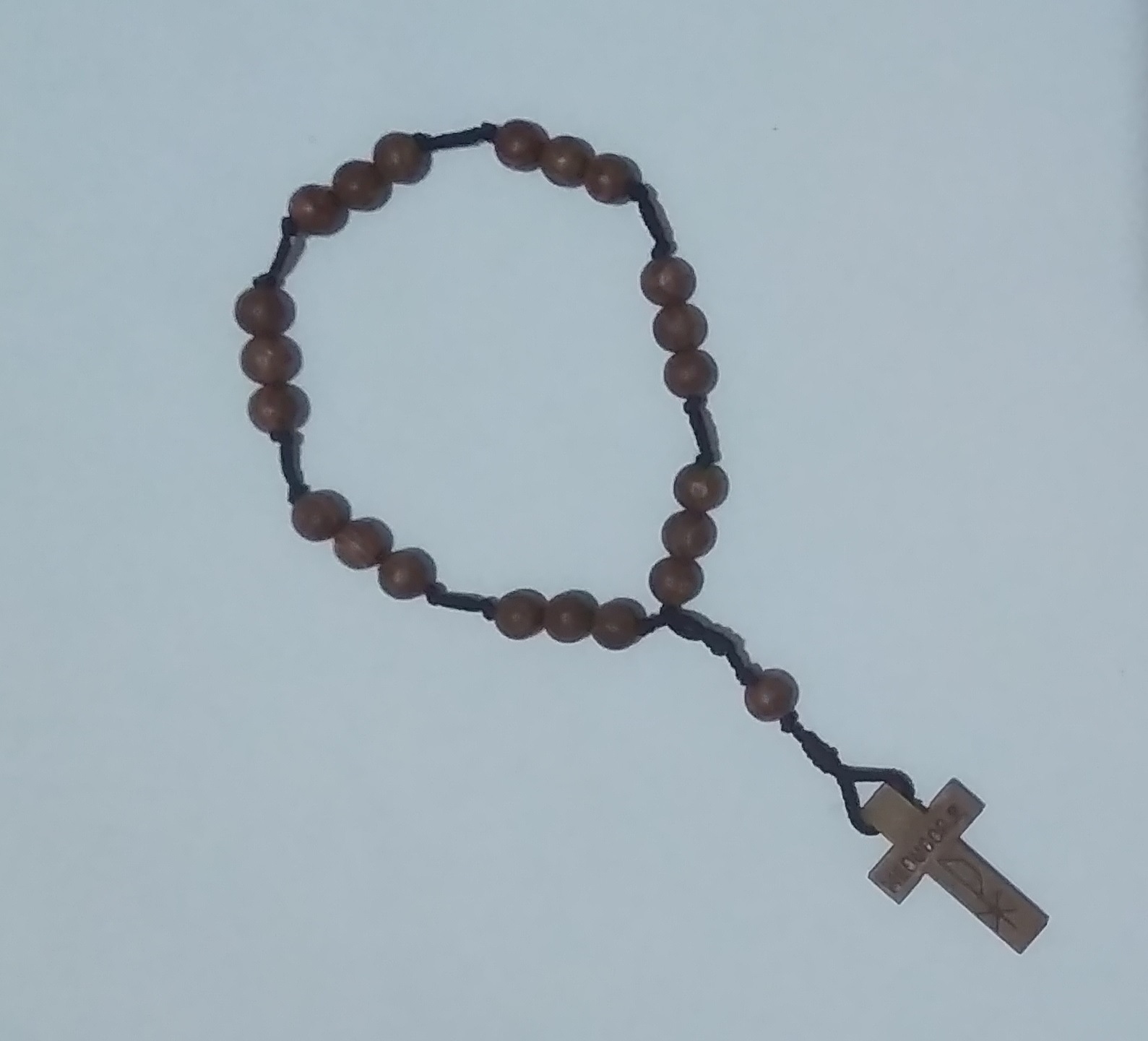
- The Peace Rosary of Medjugorje, also known as Peace Chaplet of Medjugorje, recommended by the Virgin Mary on her apparitions
  Medjugorje Peace Chaplet, consist of one Apostle creed, followed by 7 group of one Our Father, one Hail Mary, and one Glory Be, close by Memorare.

== See also ==
- Rosary based prayers

== Bibliography ==
- My Treasury of Chaplets, by Patricia S. Quintiliani, The Ravengate Press, 1986/99. ISBN 0-911218-36-X
