= Office of the Dead =

Prayer cycle

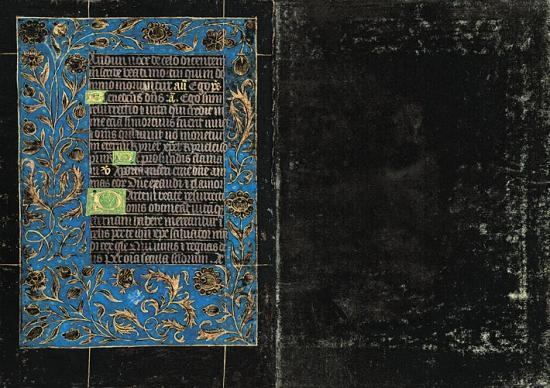
Office of the Dead, 15th century, Black Hours, Morgan MS 493

The Office of the Dead or Office for the Dead (in Latin, Officium Defunctorum) is a prayer cycle of the Canonical Hours in the Catholic Church, Anglican Church and Lutheran Church, said for the repose of the soul of a decedent. It is the proper reading on All Souls' Day (normally November 2) for all departed souls, and can be a votive office on other days when said for a particular decedent. The work is composed of different psalms, scripture, prayers and other parts, divided into The Office of Readings, Lauds, Daytime Prayer, Vespers and Compline.

== In the postconciliar form ==
The current form, according to the 2000 Liturgia Horaria (Liturgy of the Hours) editio typica altera (second typical edition) includes the normal cycle of a typical ferial office, namely an Office of Readings (Matins), Morning Prayer (Lauds), Daytime Prayer (Midmorning Prayer (Terce), Midday Prayer (Sext), or Midafternoon Prayer (None)), and Evening Prayer (Vespers). The final hour, Night Prayer (Compline), is taken from Sunday. The Office of Readings includes Psalms 40 [39]: 2-14, 17-18 (this psalm selection is split between verses 9 and 10 into two sections, to keep the character of threefold cycle of Psalms for the hour); and 42 [41]. These psalms are followed by two longer readings which are variable and come from one of multiple options. Morning Prayer (Lauds) includes Psalm 51 [50], the Canticle of Hezekiah (Isaiah 38:10-14, 17-20), and either Psalm 146 [145] or 150. These are followed by a short reading, a responsory, the Canticle of Zechariah (Benedictus) and the intercessions (preces). Daytime Prayer consists of Psalms 70 [69], 85 [84], and 86 [85]. These are followed by a short reading and a versicle which vary depending on which of the little hours are being used for Daytime Prayer. Evening Prayer (Vespers) includes Psalms 121 [120], 130 [129], and a canticle from Philippians, known sometimes as the Kenotic Hymn (Phil 2:6-11). This is followed by a short reading, a responsory, the Canticle of Mary (Magnificat), and the intercessions (preces). The hour of Night Prayer (Compline) is taken from Sunday after Evening Prayer II (Second Vespers).

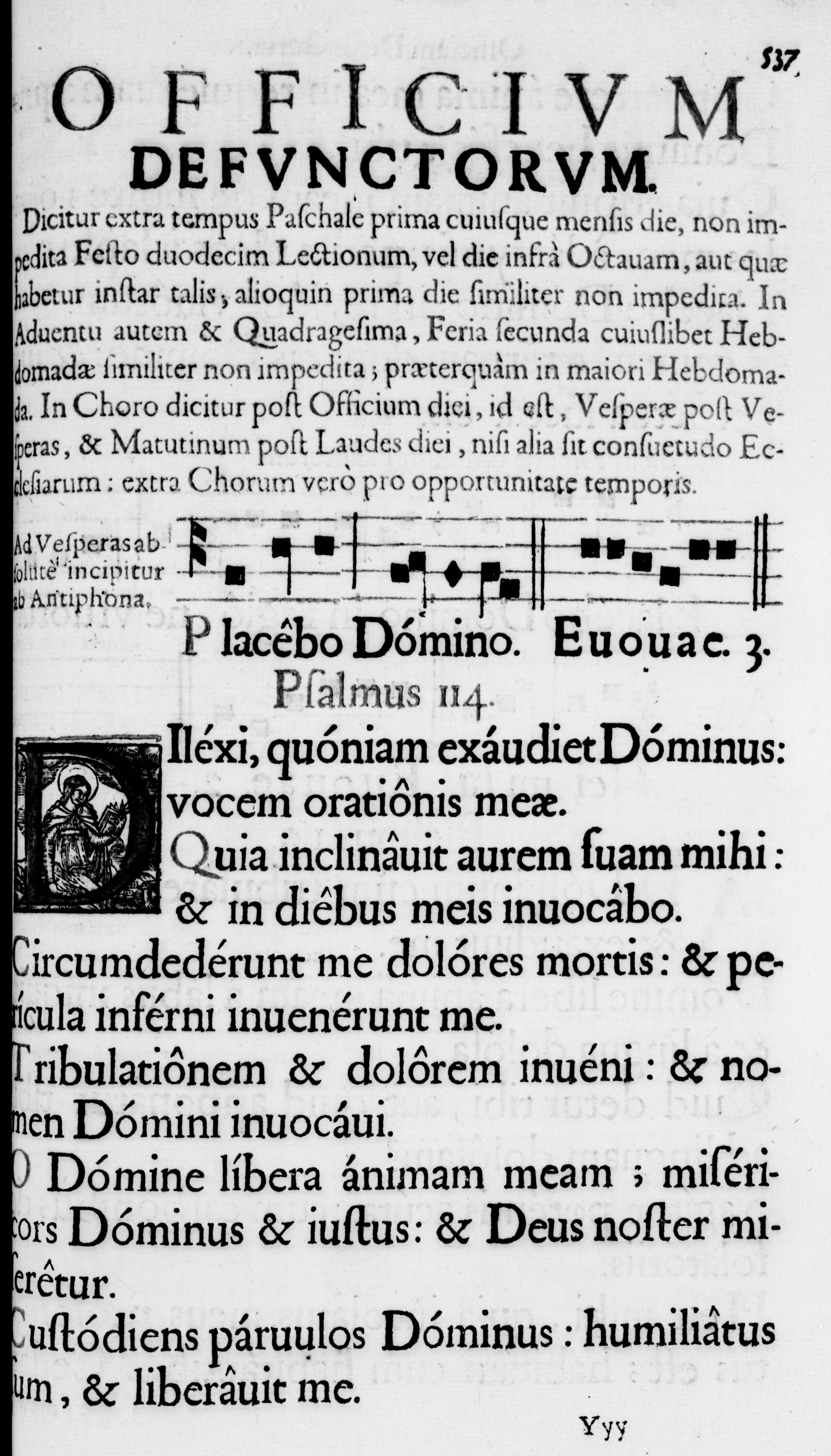
Beginning of the office of the dead in monastic rite: Vespers with the antiphon Placebo (Psalterium monasticum, 1626)

== In the preconciliar form ==
This office, as it exists in the Roman Rite up to and including the 1960 Roman Breviary, is composed of First Vespers (known as The Placébo from the first word of its opening antiphon) Matins and Lauds (traditional known together as The Dírige from the opening antiphon of the first nocturn of Matins), and the Mass (known as The Requiem from the first word of its proper opening chant, or Introit). The author is not known, but the office as it existed before the alternative was no older than the 7th or 8th century. A well-known refrain from the cycle is Timor mortis conturbat me, "The fear of death disturbs me" or, more colloquially, "I am scared of dying". The word dirge is a derivative from Dírige, the name of the Matins Laudes section of the cycle.

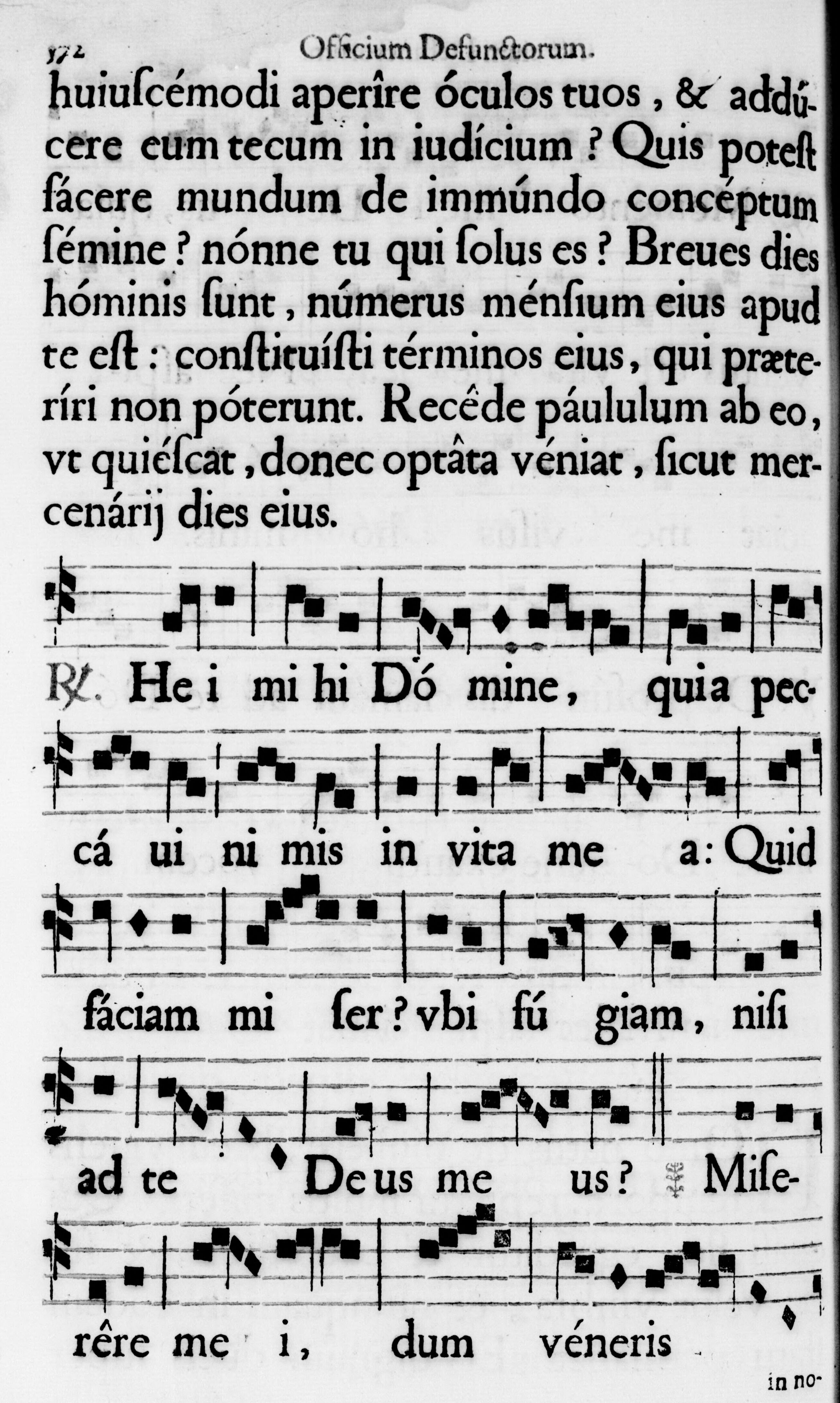
Office of the dead, vigils, second nocturn: end of the fifth reading (Book of Job 14, 1–6) and the responsory Hei mihi

The Vespers of the older form of the office comprise Psalms 114 (116), 119 (120), 120 (121), 129 (130), and 137 (138), with the Magnificat and the preces. Matins, composed like those of feast days, had three nocturns (with one of the three nocturns being said at any given votive Office), each consisting of three psalms and three lessons: in the first nocturn Psalms 5, 6, and 7: in the second nocturn Psalms 22 (23), 24 (25), and 26 (27): and in the third nocturn Psalms 39 (40), 40 (41), and 41 (42). Lauds, usually sung or recited in conjunction with Matins immediately after the last nocturn, consisted of five Psalms: 50 (51), 64 (65), 62 (63) and 66 (67) recited as one psalm, the canticle of Ezechias, and the three Laudate psalms recited as one, after which followed the verse and response, the Benedictus, and a series of preces including Psalm 129. Pope Pius X's reform of the Breviary deleted Psalms 66, 149, and 150 from Lauds in any case where they had been attached to other psalms, and this reform was also applied to the Office of the Dead. The office differs in important points from the other offices of the Roman Liturgy. It lacks the Little Hours, the Second Vespers, or the Compline. In this respect it resembles the ancient vigils, which began at eventide (First Vespers), continued during the night (Matins), and ended at the dawn (Lauds); Mass followed and terminated the vigil of the feast. The absence of the introduction, "Deus in adjutorium", the hymns, absolution, blessings, and of the doxology in the psalms also recall ancient times, when these additions had not yet been made. The psalms are chosen not in their serial order, as in the Sunday Office or the Roman ferial Office, but because certain verses, which serve as antiphons, seem to allude to the state of the dead. The use of some of these psalms in the funeral service is of high antiquity, as appears from passages by Augustine and other writers of the fourth and fifth centuries. The lessons from Job, so suitable for the Office of the Dead, were also read in very early days at funeral services. The responses, too, deserve notice, especially the response "Libera me, Domine, de viis inferni qui portas æreas confregisti et visitasti inferum et dedisti eis lumen . . . qui erant in poenis . . . advenisti redemptor noster" etc. This is one of the few texts in the Roman Liturgy alluding to Christ's descent into hell. It is also a very ancient composition (see Cabrol, "La descente du Christ aux enfers" in "Rassegna Gregor.", May and June, 1909).

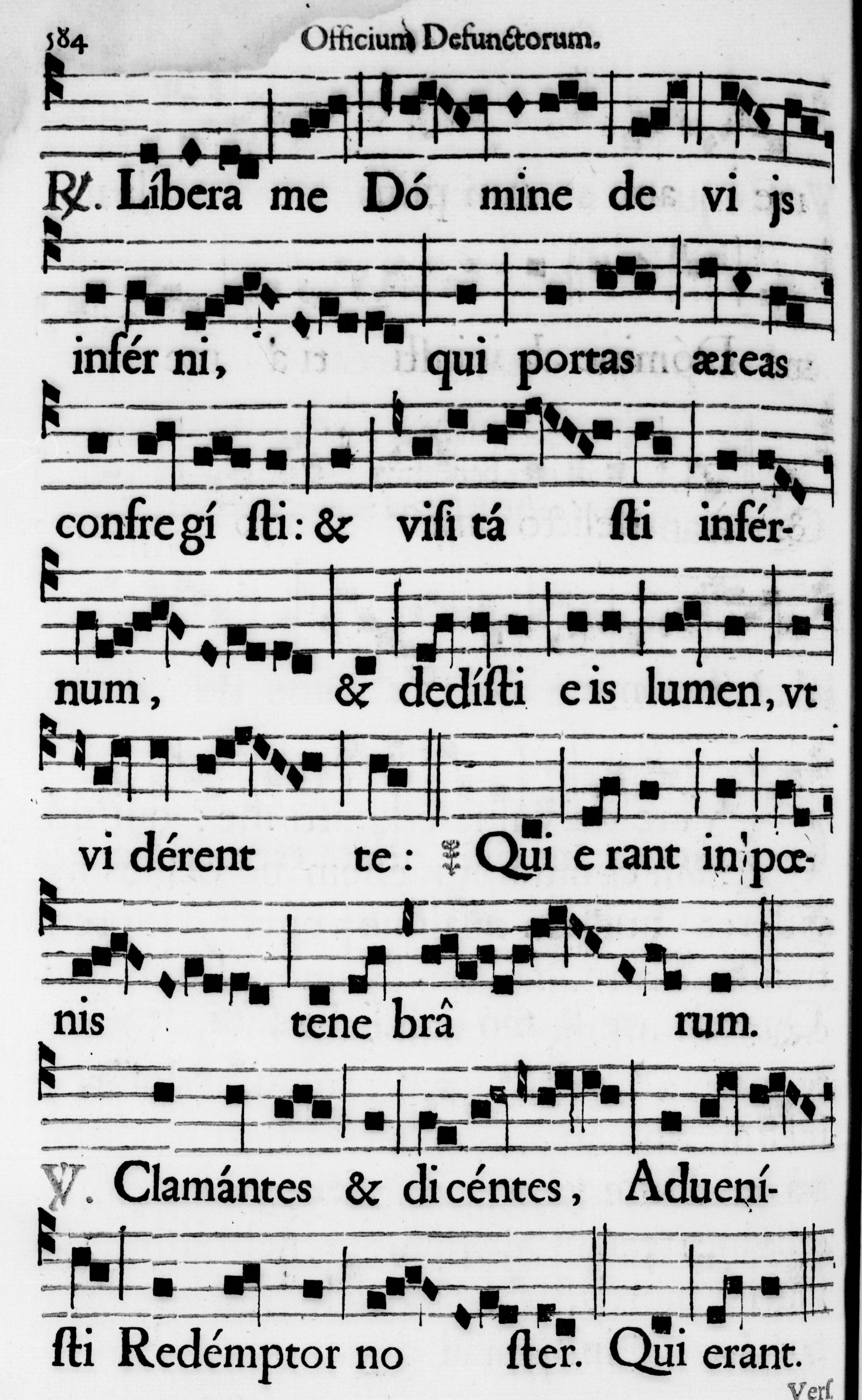
Office of the dead, vigils, third nocturn: ninth responsory Libera me Domine de viis inferni

The "Libera me de morte æterna", which is found more complete in the ancient manuscripts, dates also from an early period (see Cabrol in "Dict. d'archéol. et de liturgie", s. v. Absoute). Pierre Batiffol remarks that it is not of Roman origin, but it is very ancient (Hist. du brév., 148). The distinctive character of the Mass, its various epistles, its tract, its offertory in the form of a prayer, the communion (like the offertory) with versicles, according to the ancient custom, and the sequence "Dies Iræ" (q.v.; concerning its author see also BURIAL), it is impossible to dwell upon here. The omission of the Alleluia, and the kiss of peace is also characteristic of this mass. There was a time when the Alleluia was one of the chants customary at funeral services (see Dict. d'archéol. et de liturgie, s. v. Alleluia, I, 1235). Later it was looked upon exclusively as a song of joy, and was omitted on days of penance (e.g. Lent and ember week), sometimes in Advent, and at all funeral ceremonies. It is replaced today by a tract. A treatise of the 8th-9th century published by Muratori (Liturg. Rom. vet., II, 391) shows that the Alleluia was then suppressed. The omission of the kiss of peace at Mass is probably because that ceremony preceded the distribution of the Eucharist to the faithful and was a preparation for it, so, as communion is not given at the Mass for the Dead, the kiss of peace was suppressed.

Not to speak of the variety of ceremonies of the Mozarabic, Ambrosian, or Eastern rites, even in countries where the Roman liturgy prevailed, there were many variations. The lessons, the responses, and other formulae were borrowed from various sources; certain churches included in this office the Second Vespers and Compline; in other places, instead of the lessons of the Roman Ritual, they read Augustine, Proverbs, Ecclesiastes, Ecclesiasticus, Osee, Isaiah, Daniel, etc. The responses varied likewise; many examples may be found in Martène and the writers cited below in the bibliography. It is fortunate that the Roman Rite preserved carefully and without notable change this office, which, like that of Holy Week, has retained in its archaic forms the memory and the atmosphere of a very ancient liturgy. The Mozarabic Rite possesses a very rich funeral ritual. Marius Férotin in his "Liber Ordinum" (pp. 107 sqq.) has published a ritual (probably the oldest extant), dating back possibly to the 7th century. He has also published a large number of votive Masses of the dead. For the Ambrosian Rite, see Magistretti, "Manuale Ambrosianum", I (Milan, 1905), 67; for the Greek Ritual, see Burial, pp. 77–8.

Notably, the Anglican Church and Lutheran Church retained The Office of the Dead after the Reformation.

== History ==
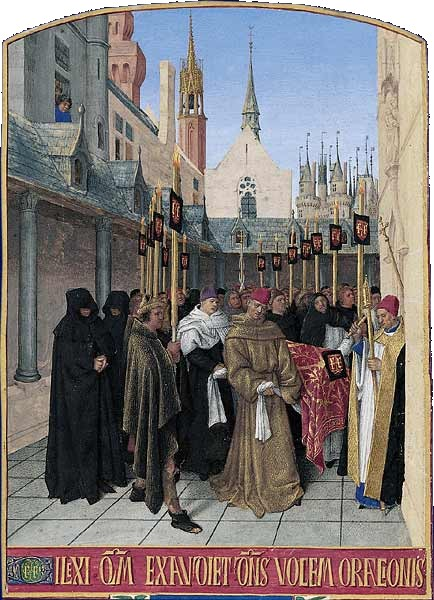
Office of the Dead from the Hours of Étienne Chevalier, Jean Fouquet, c. 1452–1460

The Office of the Dead has been attributed at times to Isidore, to Augustine, to Ambrose, and even to Origen. The Catholic Encyclopedia dismisses these attributions as unfounded, arguing that it cannot be older than the 7th or even 8th century. Its authorship is discussed at length in the dissertation of Horatius de Turre. Pierre Batiffol attributes it to Amalarius of Metz, who does refer to the "Agenda Mortuorum" contained in a sacramentary, but without claiming authorship. Bäumer-Biron, on the other hand, attributes it to Alcuin. who is known to have written various liturgical texts; but Fernand Cabrol argues that there is no reason for considering him the author of this particular office.

The Gregorian Antiphonary contains a mass and an office in agenda mortuorum, but it is admitted that this part is an addition; a fortiori this applies to the Gelasian. The Maurist editors of St. Gregory are inclined to attribute their composition to Albinus and Etienne of Liège (Microl., lx). But if it is impossible to trace the office and the mass in their actual form beyond the 9th or 8th century, it is notwithstanding certain that the prayers and a service for the dead existed long before that time. They appear in the 5th, 4th, and even in the 3rd and 2nd century. Pseudo-Dionysius, Sts. Gregory of Nyssa, Jerome, and Augustine, Tertullian, and the inscriptions in the catacombs afford a proof of this (see Burial, III, 76; PRAYERS FOR THE DEAD; Cabrol, "La prière pour les morts" in "Rev. d'apologétique", 15 September 1909, pp. 881–93).

== Practice and obligation ==
The Office of the Dead was composed originally to satisfy private devotion to the dead, and at first had no official character. Even in the 11th, 12th, and 13th centuries, it was recited chiefly by the religious orders (the Cluniacs, Cistercians, Carthusians), like the Little Office of Our Lady (see Guyet, loc. cit., 465). Later it was prescribed for all clerics and became obligatory whenever a ferial office was celebrated. It has even been said that it was to remove the obligation of reciting it that the feasts of double and semi-double rite were multiplied, for it could be omitted on such days (Bäumer-Biron, op. cit., II, 198). The reformed Breviary of St. Pius V assigned the recitation of the Office of the Dead to the first free day in the month, the Mondays of Advent and Lent, to some vigils, and ember days. Even then it was not obligatory, for the bull "Quod a nobis" of the same pope merely recommends it earnestly, like the Office of Our Lady and the Penitential Psalms, without imposing it as a duty (Van der Stappen, "Sacra Liturgia", I, Malines, 1898, p. 115). At the present time, it is obligatory on the clergy only on the feast of All Souls and in certain mortuary services. Some religious orders (Carthusians, Cistercians etc.) have preserved the custom of reciting it in choir on the days assigned by the Bull "Quod a nobis".

== Indulgence ==
In the ancient rite of the Roman Catholic Church, with bull Supremi omnipotentis Dei of 11 March 1572, Pope Pius V granted the indulgence of 50 days for those who recite the penitential psalms.

The 2004 Enchiridion Indulgentiarum grants the partial indulgence for the Office of the Dead.

== See also ==
- Purgatory
