= Jeffrey Kurtzman =

American musicologist (born 1940)

Jeffrey Gordon Kurtzman
- Born: 1940 (age 85–86)
- Education: University of Colorado; University of Illinois
- Occupations: Classical pianist; Musicologist; Music editor
- Organizations: Rice University; Washington University in St. Louis; Carus-Verlag

Jeffrey Gordon Kurtzman (born 1940) is an American pianist, musicologist and editor. A professor of musicology at the Washington University in St. Louis, he is known for his research on Italian sacred music of the 17th century, especially Monteverdi's Vespro della Beata Vergine.

== Life ==
Kurtzman studied piano at the University of Colorado, graduating in piano performance in 1963. He studied musicology at the University of Illinois from 1965 to 1968, earning a PhD in 1972 with a dissertation entitled The Monteverdi Vespers of 1610 and their Relationship with Italian Sacred Music of the Early Seventeenth Century. He taught at Rice University from 1975, was appointed a professor in 1982, and has been a professor of musicology at the Washington University in St. Louis since 1986.

Kurtzman is known for his research on Italian sacred music of the Renaissance and early Baroque, especially Monteverdi's Vespro della Beata Vergine. He edited music by Monteverdi for Carus-Verlag, including the collection of sacred music Selva morale e spirituale and excerpts from it. He authored a critical edition of the Vespro della Beata Vergine for Oxford University Press in 1999 and subsequently wrote a book, The Monteverdi Vespers of 1610: Music, Context, Performance. A reviewer described it as "comprehensive" and "authoritative", covering Monteverdi's work in the context of his contemporaries, the music, and considerations for its performance. He noted the author's knowledge and "keen musical instincts" in aspects of performance such as tempo, tuning, pitch and transposition, vocal technique, pronunciation and ornamentation, and continuo realization.

Together with Anne Schnoebelen, Kurtzman published a catalogue of sacred music printed in Italy, around 2000 works for mass and other liturgical functions. He edited the complete works by Alessandro Grandi and co-founded the Society for Seventeenth-Century Music.
