= Psalm 71 =

Biblical psalm

- "In thee, O LORD, do I put my trust: let me never be put to confusion"
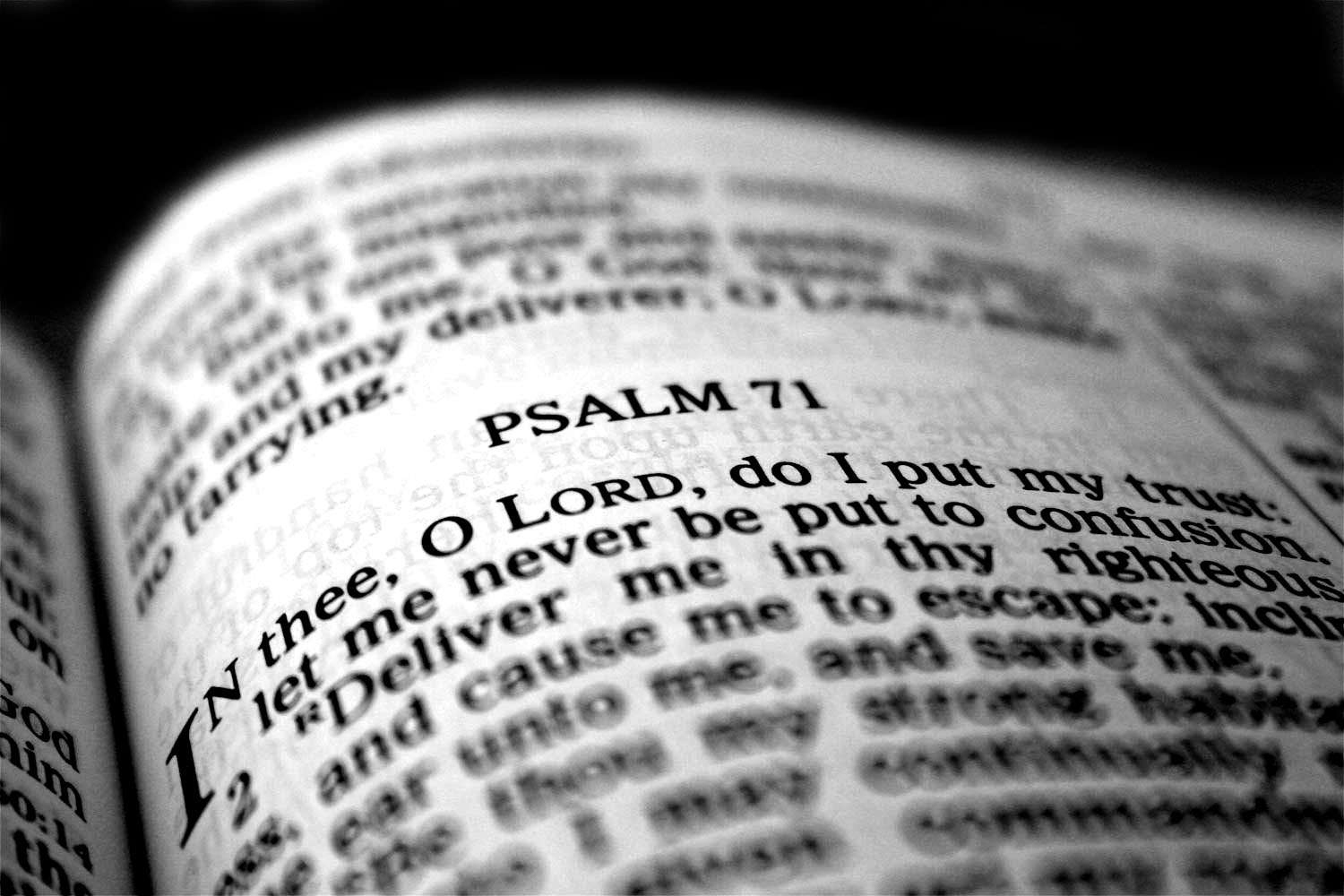
- A Bible open to Psalm 71
- Other name: Psalmus 70; "In te Domine speravi"
- Language: Hebrew (original)

Psalm 71
- ← Psalm 70 Psalm 72 →
- Book: Book of Psalms
- Hebrew Bible part: Ketuvim
- Order in the Hebrew part: 1
- Category: Sifrei Emet
- Christian Bible part: Old Testament
- Order in the Christian part: 19

Psalm 71 is the 71st psalm of the Book of Psalms, beginning in English in the King James Version: "In thee, O LORD, do I put my trust: let me never be put to confusion". It has no title in the Hebrew version. In the slightly different numbering system used in the Greek Septuagint and Latin Vulgate translations of the Bible, this psalm is Psalm 70. In Latin, it is known as "In te Domine speravi".

The psalm has 24 verses in both English and Hebrew verse numbering. It forms a regular part of Jewish, Catholic, Lutheran, Anglican and other Protestant liturgies. It has been paraphrased in hymns and set to music.

== Commentary ==
Psalm 71 in the Hebrew text does not have a title, one of four such psalms in the first two books of the Psalter. However, the Greek Septuagint text bears the title: "By David, of the sons of Jonadab and the first ones taken captive".

Theologian Albert Barnes suggests that it "belongs to the "class" of psalms which refer to the trials of the righteous".

Verses 9, 17 and 18 suggest that the psalmist is an old man, perhaps a king towards the end of his reign, seeking relief from distress in form of severe illness or the approach of death (verse 20), as well as the taunts of his "enemies" asserting that God has abandoned him (verse 11). The writer affirms his close relationship with God as he speaks of the faith in God which has sustained him all his life (verses 5–6, cf. 17), praying that God will not reject him (verse 9), declaring his witness to God's salvation (verses 15, 18), while asking for renewed health (verses 20–21) and the discrediting of his enemies (verse 13, cf. verse 4), then he will renew his praises (verses 14–16, 22–24).

Ignatius M.C. Obinwa wrote a book on this psalm, based on his doctoral thesis. Obinwa uses a quantitative lexical analysis to argue that the theme of the psalm is not old age, but refuge and YHWH's righteousness.

One unique feature of this psalm is the frequent allusion to other psalms (even almost direct quotation) such as:

- Verses 1–3 almost matches Psalm 31:1–3
- Verses 5–6 alludes to Psalm 22:9–10
- Verse 11 (NRSV reverses the clauses) to Psalm 22:1
- Verses 12–13 to Psalm 35:22; 38:21; 40:13–14
- Verse 24 to Psalm 35:4, 26; 40:14.

== Uses ==
=== Judaism ===
- Verse 19 is part of Tzidkatcha.

=== Book of Common Prayer ===
In the Church of England's Book of Common Prayer, this psalm is appointed to be read on the morning of the 14th day of the month.

== Musical settings ==
Heinrich Schütz set Psalm 71 in a metred version in German, "Auf dich, Herr, trau ich alle Zeit", SWV 168, as part of the Becker Psalter, first published in 1628.

Marc-Antoine Charpentier, "In te Domine speravi" H.228, for soloists, chorus, strings and continuo (1699)

== Text ==
The following table shows the Hebrew text of the Psalm with vowels, alongside the Koine Greek text in the Septuagint and the English translation from the King James Version. Note that the meaning can slightly differ between these versions, as the Septuagint and the Masoretic Text come from different textual traditions. (Note: A 1917 translation directly from Hebrew to English by the Jewish Publication Society can be found here or here, and an 1844 translation directly from the Septuagint by L. C. L. Brenton can be found here. Both translations are in the public domain.) In the Septuagint, this psalm is numbered Psalm 70.

#	Hebrew	English	Greek
1	בְּךָֽ־יְהֹוָ֥ה חָסִ֑יתִי אַל־אֵב֥וֹשָׁה לְעוֹלָֽם׃	In thee, O LORD, do I put my trust: let me never be put to confusion.	Τῷ Δαυΐδ· υἱῶν ᾿Ιωναδὰβ καὶ τῶν πρώτων αἰχμαλωτισθέντων. - ΕΠΙ ΣΟΙ, Κύριε, ἤλπισα, μὴ καταισχυνθείην εἰς τὸν αἰῶνα.
2	בְּצִדְקָֽתְךָ֗ תַּצִּילֵ֥נִי וּֽתְפַלְּטֵ֑נִי הַטֵּֽה־אֵלַ֥י אׇ֝זְנְךָ֗ וְהוֹשִׁיעֵֽנִי׃	Deliver me in thy righteousness, and cause me to escape: incline thine ear unto me, and save me.	ἐν τῇ δικαιοσύνῃ σου ῥῦσαί με καὶ ἐξελοῦ με, κλῖνον πρός με τὸ οὖς σου καὶ σῶσόν με.
3	הֱיֵ֤ה לִ֨י ׀ לְצ֥וּר מָע֡וֹן לָב֗וֹא תָּמִ֗יד צִוִּ֥יתָ לְהוֹשִׁיעֵ֑נִי כִּֽי־סַלְעִ֖י וּמְצוּדָתִ֣י אָֽתָּה׃	Be thou my strong habitation, whereunto I may continually resort: thou hast given commandment to save me; for thou art my rock and my fortress.	γενοῦ μοι εἰς Θεὸν ὑπερασπιστὴν καὶ εἰς τόπον ὀχυρὸν τοῦ σῶσαί με, ὅτι στερέωμά μου καὶ καταφυγή μου εἶ σύ.
4	אֱֽלֹהַ֗י פַּ֭לְּטֵנִי מִיַּ֣ד רָשָׁ֑ע מִכַּ֖ף מְעַוֵּ֣ל וְחוֹמֵֽץ׃	Deliver me, O my God, out of the hand of the wicked, out of the hand of the unrighteous and cruel man.	ὁ Θεός μου, ῥῦσαί με ἐκ χειρὸς ἁμαρτωλοῦ, ἐκ χειρὸς παρανομοῦντος καὶ ἀδικοῦντος·
5	כִּֽי־אַתָּ֥ה תִקְוָתִ֑י אֲדֹנָ֥י יֱ֝הֹוִ֗ה מִבְטַחִ֥י מִנְּעוּרָֽי׃	For thou art my hope, O Lord GOD: thou art my trust from my youth.	ὅτι σὺ εἶ ἡ ὑπομονή μου, Κύριε· Κύριε, ἡ ἐλπίς μου ἐκ νεότητός μου,
6	עָלֶ֤יךָ ׀ נִסְמַ֬כְתִּי מִבֶּ֗טֶן מִמְּעֵ֣י אִ֭מִּי אַתָּ֣ה גוֹזִ֑י בְּךָ֖ תְהִלָּתִ֣י תָמִֽיד׃	By thee have I been holden up from the womb: thou art he that took me out of my mother's bowels: my praise shall be continually of thee.	ἐπὶ σὲ ἐπεστηρίχθην ἀπὸ γαστρός, ἐκ κοιλίας μητρός μου σύ μου εἶ σκεπαστής· ἐν σοὶ ἡ ὕμνησίς μου διαπαντός.
7	כְּ֭מוֹפֵת הָיִ֣יתִי לְרַבִּ֑ים וְ֝אַתָּ֗ה מַחֲסִי־עֹֽז׃	I am as a wonder unto many; but thou art my strong refuge.	ὡσεὶ τέρας ἐγενήθην τοῖς πολλοῖς, καὶ σὺ βοηθὸς κραταιός.
8	יִמָּ֣לֵא פִ֭י תְּהִלָּתֶ֑ךָ כׇּל־הַ֝יּ֗וֹם תִּפְאַרְתֶּֽךָ׃	Let my mouth be filled with thy praise and with thy honour all the day.	πληρωθήτω τὸ στόμα μου αἰνέσεως, ὅπως ὑμνήσω τὴν δόξαν σου, ὅλην τὴν ἡμέραν τὴν μεγαλοπρέπειάν σου.
9	אַֽל־תַּ֭שְׁלִיכֵנִי לְעֵ֣ת זִקְנָ֑ה כִּכְל֥וֹת כֹּ֝חִ֗י אַֽל־תַּעַזְבֵֽנִי׃	Cast me not off in the time of old age; forsake me not when my strength faileth.	μὴ ἀπορρίψῃς με εἰς καιρὸν γήρως, ἐν τῷ ἐκλείπειν τὴν ἰσχύν μου μὴ ἐγκαταλίπῃς με.
10	כִּֽי־אָמְר֣וּ אוֹיְבַ֣י לִ֑י וְשֹׁמְרֵ֥י נַ֝פְשִׁ֗י נוֹעֲצ֥וּ יַחְדָּֽו׃	For mine enemies speak against me; and they that lay wait for my soul take counsel together,	ὅτι εἶπαν οἱ ἐχθροί μου ἐμοὶ καὶ οἱ φυλάσσοντες τὴν ψυχήν μου ἐβουλεύσαντο ἐπὶ τὸ αὐτό
11	לֵ֭אמֹר אֱלֹהִ֣ים עֲזָב֑וֹ רִֽדְפ֥וּ וְ֝תִפְשׂ֗וּהוּ כִּי־אֵ֥ין מַצִּֽיל׃	Saying, God hath forsaken him: persecute and take him; for there is none to deliver him.	λέγοντες· ὁ Θεὸς ἐγκατέλιπεν αὐτόν· καταδιώξατε καὶ καταλάβετε αὐτόν, ὅτι οὐκ ἔστιν ὁ ρυόμενος.
12	אֱ֭לֹהִים אַל־תִּרְחַ֣ק מִמֶּ֑נִּי אֱ֝לֹהַ֗י לְעֶזְרָ֥תִי (חישה) [חֽוּשָׁה]׃	O God, be not far from me: O my God, make haste for my help.	ὁ Θεός μου, μὴ μακρύνῃς ἀπ᾿ ἐμοῦ· ὁ Θεός μου, εἰς τὴν βοήθειάν μου πρόσχες.
13	יֵבֹ֣שׁוּ יִכְלוּ֮ שֹׂטְנֵ֢י נַ֫פְשִׁ֥י יַעֲט֣וּ חֶ֭רְפָּה וּכְלִמָּ֑ה מְ֝בַקְשֵׁ֗י רָֽעָתִֽי׃	Let them be confounded and consumed that are adversaries to my soul; let them be covered with reproach and dishonour that seek my hurt.	αἰσχυνθήτωσαν καὶ ἐκλιπέτωσαν οἱ ἐνδιαβάλλοντες τὴν ψυχήν μου, περιβαλλέσθωσαν αἰσχύνην καὶ ἐντροπὴν οἱ ζητοῦντες τὰ κακά μοι.
14	וַ֭אֲנִי תָּמִ֣יד אֲיַחֵ֑ל וְ֝הוֹסַפְתִּ֗י עַל־כׇּל־תְּהִלָּתֶֽךָ׃	But I will hope continually, and will yet praise thee more and more.	ἐγὼ δὲ διαπαντὸς ἐλπιῶ ἐπὶ σὲ καὶ προσθήσω ἐπὶ πᾶσαν τὴν αἴνεσίν σου.
15	פִּ֤י ׀ יְסַפֵּ֬ר צִדְקָתֶ֗ךָ כׇּל־הַיּ֥וֹם תְּשׁוּעָתֶ֑ךָ כִּ֤י לֹ֖א יָדַ֣עְתִּי סְפֹרֽוֹת׃	My mouth shall shew forth thy righteousness and thy salvation all the day; for I know not the numbers thereof.	τὸ στόμα μου ἐξαγγελεῖ τὴν δικαιοσύνην σου, ὅλην τὴν ἡμέραν τὴν σωτηρίαν σου, ὅτι οὐκ ἔγνων γραμματείας.
16	אָב֗וֹא בִּ֭גְבֻרוֹת אֲדֹנָ֣י יֱהֹוִ֑ה אַזְכִּ֖יר צִדְקָתְךָ֣ לְבַדֶּֽךָ׃	I will go in the strength of the Lord GOD: I will make mention of thy righteousness, even of thine only.	εἰσελεύσομαι ἐν δυναστείᾳ Κυρίου· Κύριε, μνησθήσομαι τῆς δικαιοσύνης σοῦ μόνου.
17	אֱֽלֹהִ֗ים לִמַּדְתַּ֥נִי מִנְּעוּרָ֑י וְעַד־הֵ֝֗נָּה אַגִּ֥יד נִפְלְאוֹתֶֽיךָ׃	O God, thou hast taught me from my youth: and hitherto have I declared thy wondrous works.	ὁ Θεός, ἃ ἐδίδαξάς με ἐκ νεότητός μου, καὶ μέχρι τοῦ νῦν ἀπαγγελῶ τὰ θαυμάσιά σου.
18	וְגַ֤ם עַד־זִקְנָ֨ה ׀ וְשֵׂיבָה֮ אֱלֹהִ֢ים אַֽל־תַּ֫עַזְבֵ֥נִי עַד־אַגִּ֣יד זְרוֹעֲךָ֣ לְד֑וֹר לְכׇל־יָ֝ב֗וֹא גְּבוּרָתֶֽךָ׃	Now also when I am old and grayheaded, O God, forsake me not; until I have shewed thy strength unto this generation, and thy power to every one that is to come.	καὶ ἕως γήρως καὶ πρεσβείου, ὁ Θεός, μὴ ἐγκαταλίπῃς με, ἕως ἂν ἀπαγγελῶ τὸν βραχίονά σου τῇ γενεᾷ πάσῃ τῇ ἐπερχομένῃ,
19	וְצִדְקָתְךָ֥ אֱלֹהִ֗ים עַד־מָ֫ר֥וֹם אֲשֶׁר־עָשִׂ֥יתָ גְדֹל֑וֹת אֱ֝לֹהִ֗ים מִ֣י כָמֽוֹךָ׃	Thy righteousness also, O God, is very high, who hast done great things: O God, who is like unto thee!	τὴν δυναστείαν σου καὶ τὴν δικαιοσύνην σου. ὁ Θεός, ἕως ὑψίστων ἃ ἐποίησας μεγαλεῖα· ὁ Θεός, τίς ὅμοιός σοι;
20	אֲשֶׁ֤ר (הראיתנו) [הִרְאִיתַ֨נִי ׀] צָר֥וֹת רַבּ֗וֹת וְרָ֫ע֥וֹת תָּשׁ֥וּב (תחינו) [תְּחַיֵּ֑נִי] וּֽמִתְּהֹמ֥וֹת הָ֝אָ֗רֶץ תָּשׁ֥וּב תַּעֲלֵֽנִי׃	Thou, which hast shewed me great and sore troubles, shalt quicken me again, and shalt bring me up again from the depths of the earth.	ὅσας ἔδειξάς μοι θλίψεις πολλὰς καὶ κακάς, καὶ ἐπιστρέψας ἐζωοποίησάς με, καὶ ἐκ τῶν ἀβύσσων τῆς γῆς πάλιν ἀνήγαγές με.
21	תֶּ֤רֶב ׀ גְּֽדֻלָּתִ֗י וְתִסֹּ֥ב תְּֽנַחֲמֵֽנִי׃	Thou shalt increase my greatness, and comfort me on every side.	ἐπλεόνασας ἐπ᾿ ἐμὲ τὴν μεγαλωσύνην σου καὶ ἐπιστρέψας παρεκάλεσάς με καὶ ἐκ τῶν ἀβύσσων τῆς γῆς πάλιν ἀνήγαγές με.
22	גַּם־אֲנִ֤י ׀ אוֹדְךָ֣ בִכְלִי־נֶבֶל֮ אֲמִתְּךָ֢ אֱלֹ֫הָ֥י אֲזַמְּרָ֣ה לְךָ֣ בְכִנּ֑וֹר קְ֝ד֗וֹשׁ יִשְׂרָאֵֽל׃	I will also praise thee with the psaltery, even thy truth, O my God: unto thee will I sing with the harp, O thou Holy One of Israel.	καὶ γὰρ ἐγὼ ἐξομολογήσομαί σοι ἐν σκεύει ψαλμοῦ τὴν ἀλήθειάν σου, ὁ Θεός· ψαλῶ σοι ἐν κιθάρᾳ, ὁ ἅγιος τοῦ ᾿Ισραήλ.
23	תְּרַנֵּ֣נָּה שְׂ֭פָתַי כִּ֣י אֲזַמְּרָה־לָּ֑ךְ וְ֝נַפְשִׁ֗י אֲשֶׁ֣ר פָּדִֽיתָ׃	My lips shall greatly rejoice when I sing unto thee; and my soul, which thou hast redeemed.	ἀγαλλιάσονται τὰ χείλη μου, ὅταν ψάλω σοι, καὶ ἡ ψυχή μου, ἣν ἐλυτρώσω.
24	גַּם־לְשׁוֹנִ֗י כׇּל־הַ֭יּוֹם תֶּהְגֶּ֣ה צִדְקָתֶ֑ךָ כִּי־בֹ֥שׁוּ כִֽי־חָ֝פְר֗וּ מְבַקְשֵׁ֥י רָעָתִֽי׃	My tongue also shall talk of thy righteousness all the day long: for they are confounded, for they are brought unto shame, that seek my hurt.	ἔτι δὲ καὶ ἡ γλῶσσά μου ὅλην τὴν ἡμέραν μελετήσει τὴν δικαιοσύνην σου, ὅταν αἰσχυνθῶσι καὶ ἐντραπῶσιν οἱ ζητοῦντες τὰ κακά μοι.
