= Psalm 70 =

Biblical psalm

- "Make haste, O God, to deliver me"
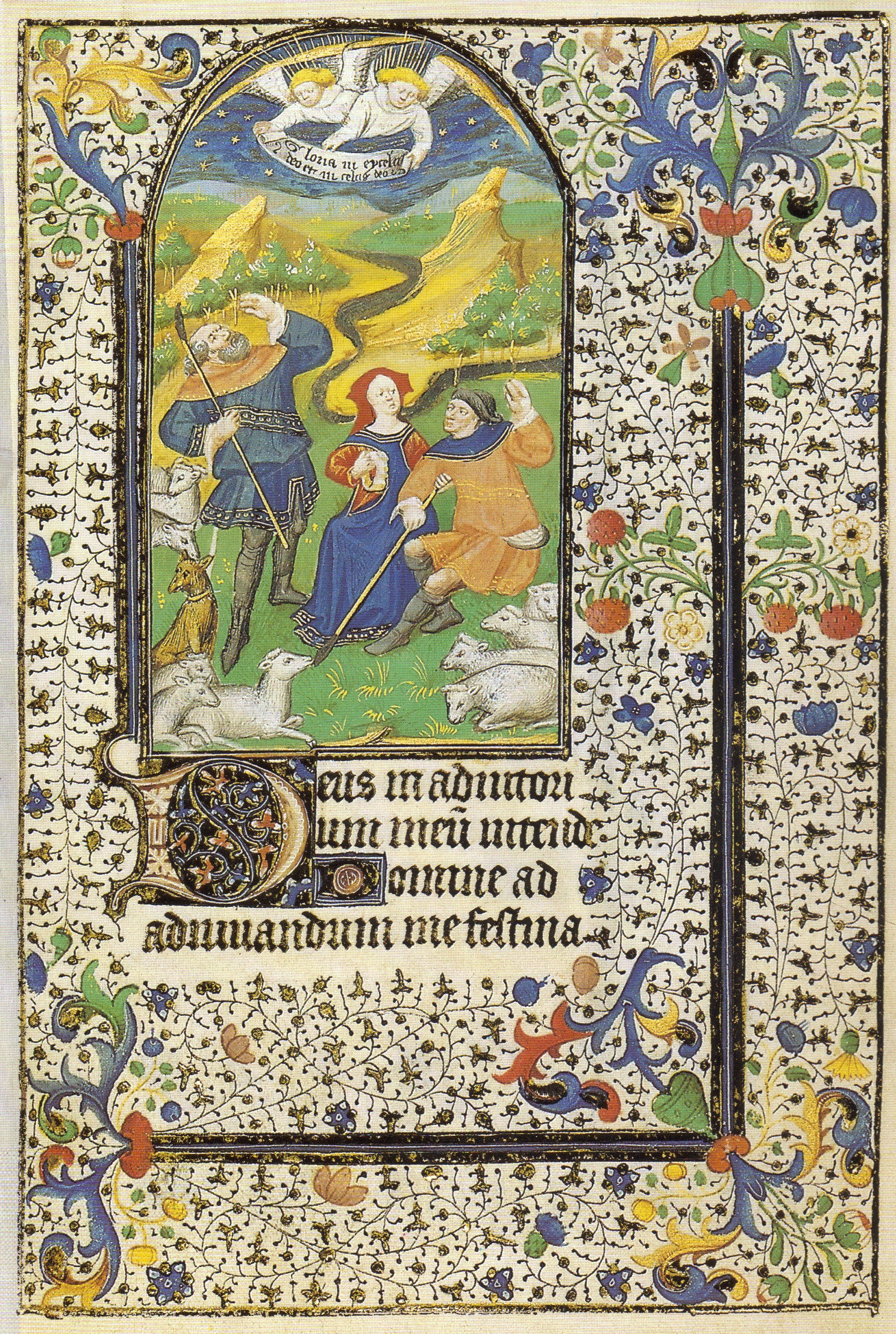
- "Deus in adiutorium meum intende" in a Mainz Book of Hours, c. 1450
- Other name: Psalm 69 (Vulgate); "Deus, in adiutorium meum intende"
- Language: Hebrew (original)

Psalm 70
- ← Psalm 69 Psalm 71 →
- Book: Book of Psalms
- Hebrew Bible part: Ketuvim
- Order in the Hebrew part: 1
- Category: Sifrei Emet
- Christian Bible part: Old Testament
- Order in the Christian part: 19

Psalm 70 is the 70th psalm of the Book of Psalms, beginning in English in the King James Version: "Make haste, O God, to deliver me". The Book of Psalms is part of the third section of the Hebrew Bible, and a book of the Christian Old Testament. In the slightly different numbering system used in the Greek Septuagint and Latin Vulgate translations of the Bible, this psalm is Psalm 69. In Latin, it is known as "Deus, in adiutorium meum intende".

There are 5 verses (6 in the Hebrew verse numbering). The entire psalm is almost identical to the closing verses of Psalm 40. Verse 1 is used as the liturgical opening prayer to every hour of the Liturgy of the Hours.

The psalm forms a regular part of Jewish, Catholic, Lutheran, Anglican and other Protestant liturgies. It has often been set to music, especially in music for vespers which its beginning opens, such as in Monteverdi's Vespro della Beata Vergine.

== Background and themes ==
The opening verse in the Hebrew identifies this psalm as one of remembrance (Biblical Hebrew: לְהַזְכִּיר, "to remember"). This opening term appears in only one other psalm, Psalm 38.

This entire psalm is virtually identical to the closing verses of Psalm 40 (verses 14–18 in the Hebrew, 13–17 in the KJV). According to the Malbim, Psalm 40 was composed by David when he was fleeing from Saul, and David repeated this psalm later when he was fleeing from Absalom. The Midrash Tehillim notes a slight discrepancy between verse 6 here ("But I am poor and needy, O God, make haste unto me") and verse 18 in Psalm 40 ("But I am poor and needy, may the Lord think of me"). The Midrash teaches that David was telling God, "Think of me in my poverty and in my need, and You will then make haste to deliver me, for You are my help and my deliverer".

Regarding the similarity between Psalms 40 and 70, Matthew Henry notes that it can sometimes be efficacious to recite the prayers one prayed in similar situations, investing them with new emotion.

The opening verse is literally "God, to deliver me, to my help! Hurry!" It is a sped up and abbreviated version of Psalm 40:14. This is consistent with hasten used repeatedly in the opening. In some views, the first verses of Psalm 40 concern the coming anointed and His deliverance, while the later verses concern the desperate in general. It is the later verses of Psalm 40 carried over to Psalm 70.

== Uses ==
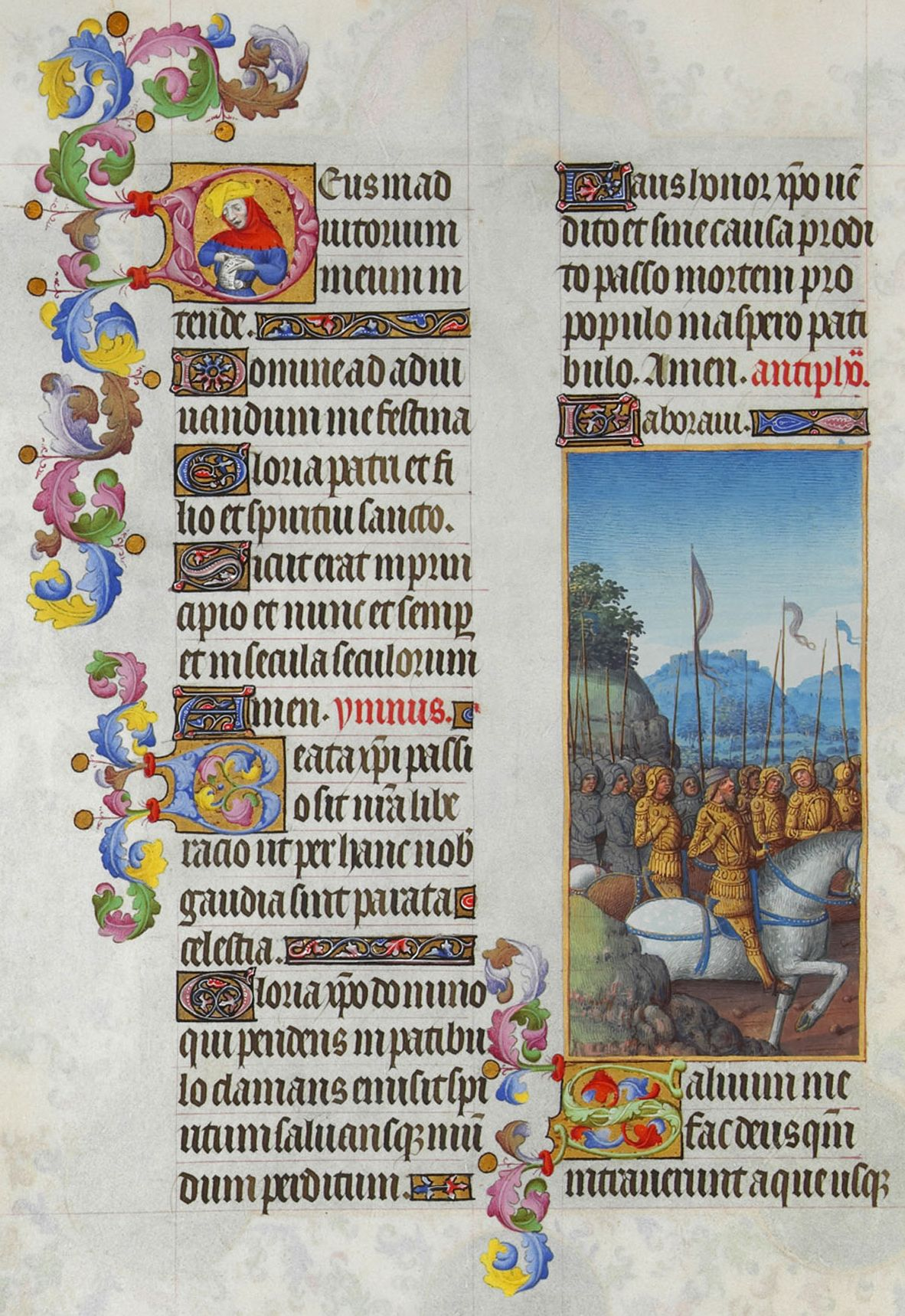
Psalm 69 (psalm 70 in the Hebrew numbering), "Deus, in adiutorium meum intende," and the beginning of psalm 68 (69), "Salvum me fac, Deus", in Les Très Riches Heures du duc de Berry, Folio 153v the Musée Condé, Chantilly.

=== Judaism ===
Psalm 70 is traditionally recited in wartime.

=== Catholic Church ===
The first verse of this psalm, "Deus in adjutorium meum intende" (O God, come to my assistance), with the response, "Domine ad adjuvandum me festina" (O Lord, make haste to help me), forms the introductory prayer to every Hour of the Roman, monastic, and Ambrosian Breviaries, except during the last three days of Holy Week, and in the Office of the Dead. While these words are said or sung, all present sign themselves with the sign of the cross.

=== Coptic Orthodox Church ===
In the Agpeya, the Coptic Church's book of hours, this psalm is prayed in the offices of Prime and Sext, as well as the first watch of the Midnight office. It is also in the prayer of the Veil, which is generally prayed only by monks.

=== Book of Common Prayer ===
In the Church of England's Book of Common Prayer, this psalm is appointed to be read on the evening of the 13th day of the month.

== Musical settings ==
As the standard phrase to open liturgical Hours, the beginning of Psalm 70 was often set to music, especially as part of music for vespers services. Claudio Monteverdi wrote a six-part setting with orchestra to begin his Vespro della Beata Vergine, published in 1610, using a revised version of the opening Toccata of his opera L'Orfeo, scored for two cornettos, three trombones, strings, and continuo. It has been described as a "call to attention" and "a piece whose brilliance is only matched by the audacity of its conception".

William Byrd wrote a setting for six voices early in his career, but did not publish it for public consumption; the manuscript is found in the Baldwin Partbooks, with the exception of the tenor partbook, which has been lost.

Heinrich Schütz set the psalm in a metred version in German, "Eil, Herr mein Gott, zu retten mich", SWV 167, as part of the Becker Psalter, first published in 1628.

Baldassare Galuppi composed a four-part setting of the complete psalm in Latin for choir and orchestra.

In 1691, Michel-Richard de Lalande composed a grand motet (catalogué S.33) for chorus, soloists and treble strings. Henry Desmarest composed a grand motet "Deus in adjuditorium" (unknown date).

Benjamin Britten set this psalm to music as part of the score he wrote for the play This Way to the Tomb in 1945. In 1951 Alan Hovhaness set the first verse in his choral work Make Haste.

== Text ==
The following table shows the Hebrew text of the Psalm with vowels, alongside the Koine Greek text in the Septuagint and the English translation from the King James Version. Note that the meaning can slightly differ between these versions, as the Septuagint and the Masoretic Text come from different textual traditions. (Note: A 1917 translation directly from Hebrew to English by the Jewish Publication Society can be found here or here, and an 1844 translation directly from the Septuagint by L. C. L. Brenton can be found here. Both translations are in the public domain.) In the Septuagint, this psalm is numbered Psalm 69.

#	Hebrew	English	Greek
(Note: In the Jewish verse numbering, the ascription of this psalm is verse 1, and the rest of the psalm begins from verse 2. However, the Christian verse numbering does not count the ascription.)	לַ֝מְנַצֵּ֗חַ לְדָוִ֥ד לְהַזְכִּֽיר׃	(To the chief Musician, A Psalm of David, to bring to remembrance.)	Εἰς τὸ τέλος· τῷ Δαυΐδ εἰς ἀνάμνησιν, εἰς τὸ σῶσαί με Κύριον. -
1	אֱלֹהִ֥ים לְהַצִּילֵ֑נִי יְ֝הֹוָ֗ה לְעֶזְרָ֥תִי חֽוּשָׁה׃	Make haste, O God, to deliver me; make haste to help me, O LORD.	Ο ΘΕΟΣ, εἰς τὴν βοήθειάν μου πρόσχες· Κύριε, εἰς τὸ βοηθῆσαί μοι σπεῦσον.
2	יֵבֹ֣שׁוּ וְיַחְפְּרוּ֮ מְבַקְשֵׁ֢י נַ֫פְשִׁ֥י יִסֹּ֣גוּ אָ֭חוֹר וְיִכָּלְמ֑וּ חֲ֝פֵצֵ֗י רָעָתִֽי׃	Let them be ashamed and confounded that seek after my soul: let them be turned backward, and put to confusion, that desire my hurt.	αἰσχυνθήτωσαν καὶ ἐντραπήτωσαν οἱ ζητοῦντες τὴν ψυχήν μου· ἀποστραφήτωσαν εἰς τὰ ὀπίσω καὶ καταισχυνθήτωσαν οἱ βουλόμενοί μου κακά·
3	יָ֭שׁוּבוּ עַל־עֵ֣קֶב בׇּשְׁתָּ֑ם הָ֝אֹמְרִ֗ים הֶ֘אָ֥ח ׀ הֶאָֽח׃	Let them be turned back for a reward of their shame that say, Aha, aha.	ἀποστραφήτωσαν παραυτίκα αἰσχυνόμενοι οἱ λέγοντές μοι· εὖγε εὖγε.
4	יָ֘שִׂ֤ישׂוּ וְיִשְׂמְח֨וּ ׀ בְּךָ֗ כׇּֽל־מְבַ֫קְשֶׁ֥יךָ וְיֹאמְר֣וּ תָ֭מִיד יִגְדַּ֣ל אֱלֹהִ֑ים אֹ֝הֲבֵ֗י יְשׁוּעָתֶֽךָ׃	Let all those that seek thee rejoice and be glad in thee: and let such as love thy salvation say continually, Let God be magnified.	ἀγαλλιάσθωσαν καὶ εὐφρανθήτωσαν ἐπὶ σοὶ πάντες οἱ ζητοῦντές σε, ὁ Θεός, καὶ λεγέτωσαν διαπαντός· μεγαλυνθήτω ὁ Κύριος, οἱ ἀγαπῶντες τὸ σωτήριόν σου.
5	וַאֲנִ֤י ׀ עָנִ֣י וְאֶבְיוֹן֮ אֱלֹהִ֢ים ח֫וּשָׁה־לִּ֥י עֶזְרִ֣י וּמְפַלְטִ֣י אַ֑תָּה יְ֝הֹוָ֗ה אַל־תְּאַחַֽר׃	But I 𝘢𝘮 poor and needy: make haste unto me, O God: thou art my help and my deliverer; O LORD, make no tarrying.	ἐγὼ δὲ πτωχός εἰμι καὶ πένης· ὁ Θεός, βοήθησόν μοι. βοηθός μου καὶ ῥύστης μου εἶ σύ· Κύριε, μὴ χρονίσῃς.
