= Deus, in adiutorium meum intende =

First part of first verse of Psalm 70

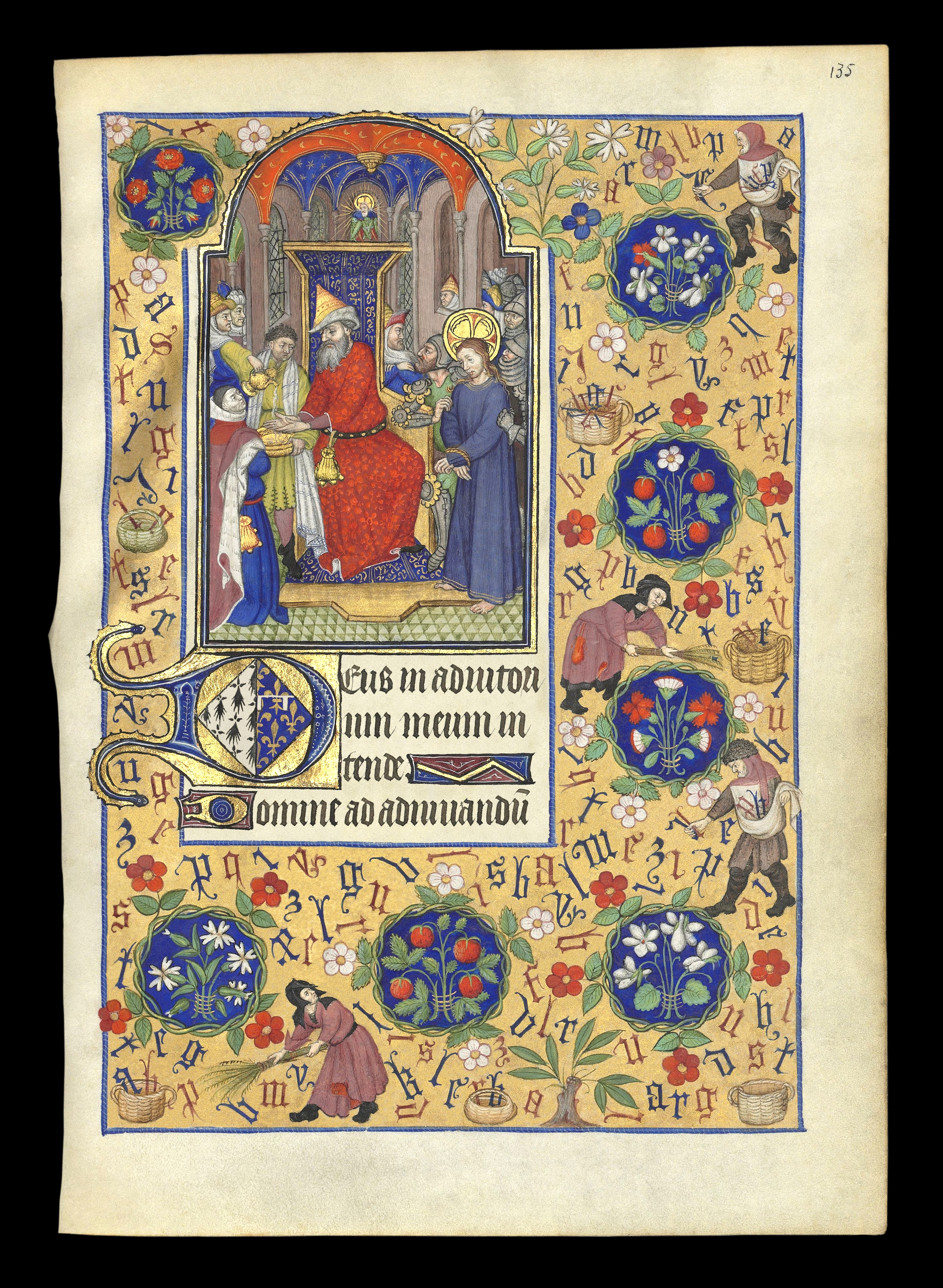
Deus, in adiutorium meum intende in the Book of Hours of Marguerite Louise d'Orléans

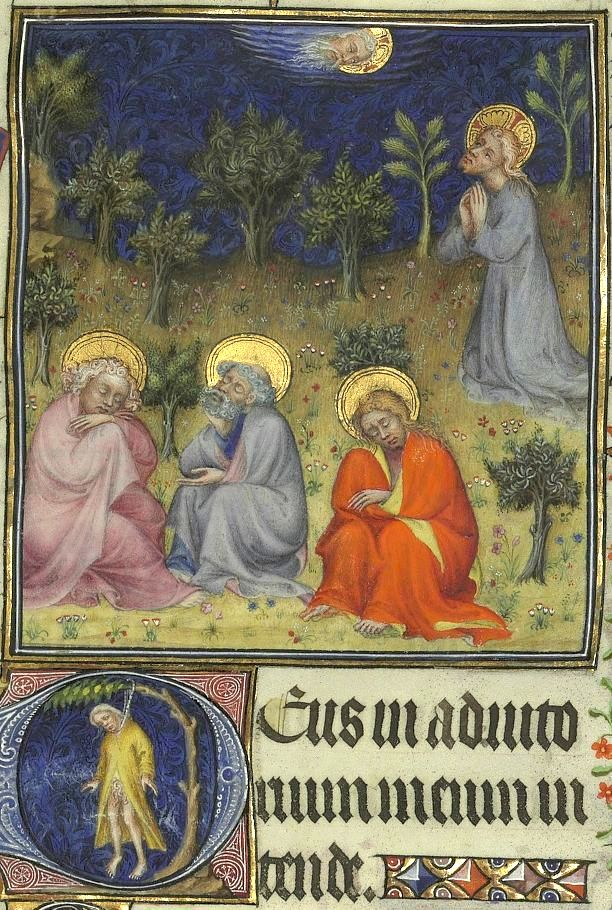
Deus, in adiutorium meum intende in Très Riches Heures du Duc de Berry

"Deus, in adiutorium meum intende", with the response "Domine, ad adiuvandum me festina" (respectively, "O GOD, come to my assistance" and "O LORD, make haste to help me") are the first verse of Psalm 70 (Psalm 69 in the Vulgate): "Make haste, O GOD, to deliver me; make haste to help me, O LORD." In this form they are a traditional Latin Christian prayer.

These words form the introductory prayer to every Hour of the Roman, Ambrosian, and monastic Breviaries, except during the last three days of Holy Week, and in the Office of the Dead. While these are recited or sung, all present bless themselves with the sign of the cross. Since the liturgical revision of the Second Vatican Council all liturgical hours begin with these words (apart from the first recited each day where the verse is replaced by the Invitatory.

Tradition says that Benedict of Nursia introduced this custom into the monastic Office, heavily influenced by the writings of Saint John Cassian. Saint Gregory the Great extended it to all the Roman churches. Saint John Cassian (Coll., X, 10) wrote that from the earliest Christian times the monks used this introduction very often, including outside of the liturgical prayers, as an invocation for every situation, for times of temptation, tiredness, and joy.

== Liturgical use ==
In placing this supplication at the beginning of every canonical hour, the Catholic Church implores the assistance of God against distractions in prayer. In the Roman Rite, the "Deus, in adiutorium" is preceded at Matins by the "Domine, labia mea aperies" ("Open Thou, O LORD, my lips), whilst in the monastic breviary, the order is reversed. At Compline, it is always preceded by the "Converte nos, Deus".

In the Mozarabic liturgy the hours commence with the triple Kyrie Eleison. In all the Latin countries north, east, and west of the Alps, the introduction to the solemn Vespers of Easter Sunday was formed by the nine Kyrie Eleison and Christe Eleison of the Easter Mass. In the churches which observe the Greek Rite, the Trisagion and other prayers open the hours.

The "Deus, in adiutorium" is repeated three times during the conclusional prayers of Prime. In monasteries, Prime was finished immediately after the prayer: "Domine, Deus omnipotens"; then the monks went from the choir to the chapter-room, where the Martyrology was read, and the day's work was given out; before dispersing to their several occupations they sang three times the "Deus, in adjutorium", to emphasize the union of prayer and labour.
