= Votive office =

A votive office was a Roman Catholic practice to celebrate particular feasts that are not in the Catholic liturgical calendar.

Votive offices became so common from 1883 that there were only around three weeks in which they could not be used.

These were abolished by Pope Pius X in 1911 by the Apostolic Constitution Divino Afflatu.
