= Missale Romanum (apostolic constitution) =

1969 Catholic legislation

Missale Romanum Latin for 'On the Roman Missal' Apostolic constitution of Pope Paul VI
- Signature date: 3 April 1969
- Subject: New Roman Missal
- Text: In Latin; In English

Missale Romanum ("On the Roman Missal") is the incipit of an apostolic constitution issued by Pope Paul VI on 3 April 1969. It promulgated the new revised version of the Roman Missal.

The new version, commonly known as Mass of Paul VI, has since largely displaced the Tridentine Mass, though indults have been granted to allow the celebration of the preconciliar rites under certain conditions.

== History ==
The Council of Trent had formally asked the Holy See to put an end to the disparities of the various rites of the Catholic Church. This request was implemented by Pope Pius V in his apostolic constitution Quo primum, promulgating an edition of the Roman missal that was to be in obligatory use throughout the Latin Church except where there was another liturgical rite that could be proven to have been in use for at least two centuries.

The Second Council of the Vatican's decree Sacrosanctum Concilium asked that significant revisions be made to the Missal; in the wake of it, some changes were officially introduced into the Mass of the Roman Rite in 1965 and 1967, but no new edition of the Roman Missal had been produced to incorporate them.

== Content ==
The Pontiff made particular mention of the following significant changes that he had made in the Roman Missal:

- To the single Eucharistic Prayer of the previous edition (which, with minor alterations, was preserved as the "First Eucharistic Prayer or Roman Canon") he added three alternative Eucharistic Prayers, increasing also the number of prefaces.
- The rites of the Order of Mass (in Latin, Ordo Missae)—that is, the largely unvarying part of the liturgy—were "simplified, while due care is taken to preserve their substance." "Elements which, with the passage of time, came to be duplicated, or were added with but little advantage" were eliminated, especially in the rites for the preparation of the bread and wine, the breaking of the bread, and Communion.
- "'Other elements which have suffered injury through accidents of history are now to be restored to the earlier norm of the Holy Fathers' (Sacrosanctum Concilium, art. 50), for example, the homily (see Sacrosanctum Concilium, art. 52) and the 'common prayer' or 'prayer of the faithful' (see Sacrosanctum Concilium, art. 53)." Paul VI also added the option of "a penitential rite or act of reconciliation with God and the brothers, at the beginning of the Mass," though this was neither an ancient part of the Introductory Rite nor mentioned in Sacrosanctum Concilium.
- He greatly increased the proportion of the Bible read at Mass. Even before Pius XII reduced the proportion further, only 1% of the Old Testament and 16.5% of the New Testament was read at Mass. In Pope Paul's revision, 13.5% of the Old Testament and 71.5% of the New Testament are read. He was able to do this by having more readings at Mass and introducing a three-year cycle of readings on Sundays and a two-year cycle on weekdays.

In addition to these changes, the Pope noted that his revision considerably modified other sections of the Missal, such as the Proper of Seasons, the Proper of Saints, the Common of Saints, the Ritual Masses, and the Votive Masses, adding: "In all of these changes, particular care has been taken with the prayers: not only has their number been increased, so that the new texts might better correspond to new needs, but also their text has been restored on the testimony of the most ancient evidences."

In Missale Romanum, Paul VI states that the new liturgical norms are to be "firm and effective, now and in the future, notwithstanding, to the extent necessary, the apostolic constitutions and ordinances issued by Our predecessors, and other prescriptions, even those deserving particular mention and derogation".

== Later events ==
=== New editions of the revised Missal ===
A second typical edition, with minor changes was approved by Paul VI in 1975. In 2000, Pope John Paul II approved a third typical edition, which appeared in 2002. This third edition added feasts, especially of some recently canonized saints, new prefaces of the Eucharistic Prayers, and additional Masses and prayers for various needs, and it revised and amplified the General Instruction of the Roman Missal.

In 2008, under Pope Benedict XVI, an emended reprint of the third edition was issued, correcting misprints and some other mistakes (such as the insertion at the beginning of the Apostles' Creed of "unum", as in the Nicene Creed). A supplement gives celebrations, such as that of Saint Pio of Pietrelcina, added to the General Roman Calendar after the initial printing of the 2002 typical edition.

Three alterations required personal approval by Pope Benedict XVI:

- A change in the order in which a bishop celebrating Mass outside his own diocese mentions the local bishop and himself
- Omission from the Roman Missal of the special Eucharistic Prayers for Masses with Children (which, however, were not thereby suppressed)
- The addition of three alternatives to the standard dismissal at the end of Mass, Ite, missa est (Go forth, the Mass is ended):
  - Ite ad Evangelium Domini annuntiandum (Go and announce the Gospel of the Lord)
  - Ite in pace, glorificando vita vestra Dominum (Go in peace, glorifying the Lord by your life)
  - Ite in pace (Go in peace)

=== Subsequent use of preconciliar rites ===
In 1971, Paul VI gave bishops permission to grant faculties to elderly or infirm priests to celebrate the older Roman Rite Mass without a congregation. Later that year, Cardinal John Heenan presented Paul VI with a petition signed by 57 scholars, intellectuals, and artists living in England, requesting permission to continue the use of the older Mass. On October 30, 1971, Paul VI granted this permission for England and Wales. Because Agatha Christie was one of the petition's 57 signers whose name Paul VI is said to have recognized, the indult became known as the Agatha Christie indult.

In the 1984 letter Quattuor abhinc annos, the Congregation for Divine Worship and the Discipline of the Sacraments under Pope John Paul II extended to the entire Latin Church the indult for bishops to authorize celebrations of the preconciliar Roman Rite Mass under certain conditions.

In 1988, Pope John Paul II issued motu proprio the apostolic letter Ecclesia Dei in which he urged a "wide and generous application" of the indult already given. Masses celebrated under the Ecclesia Dei framework came to be known as "Indult Masses."

In 2007, Pope Benedict XVI issued motu proprio the apostolic letter Summorum Pontificum in which he introduced the terminology of "extraordinary form" to describe the preconciliar liturgy. Rather than using the language of concession or permission, Benedict established the preconciliar form as parallel to the postconciliar, albeit as "extraordinary" in the sense of "different." Instead of giving bishops control over the extent of preconciliar celebrations, Benedict XVI required priests with the suitable liturgical competency to offer the preconciliar rites to "stable groups of the faithful" who requested them. Benedict also authorized the use of the older rite for the celebration of sacraments (beyond the celebration of Mass) and allowed clerics to fulfill their obligation of prayer using the Roman Breviary in lieu of the postconciliar Liturgy of the Hours. He furthermore permitted the celebration of other preconciliar Latin rites besides the Roman Rite.

In 2021, Pope Francis, motivated by a desire to stave off what he perceived to be growing rejection of the Second Vatican Council developing from groups using the preconciliar rites, issued motu proprio the apostolic letter Traditionis custodes to restore the previous status quo of bishops having authority over the celebrations of Mass in the preconciliar Roman Rite. Francis stated in the letter that the current version of the Roman Rite ought to be regarded as the "unique expression of [its] lex orandi."
