= Mass of Paul VI =

Most common liturgy of the Roman Rite

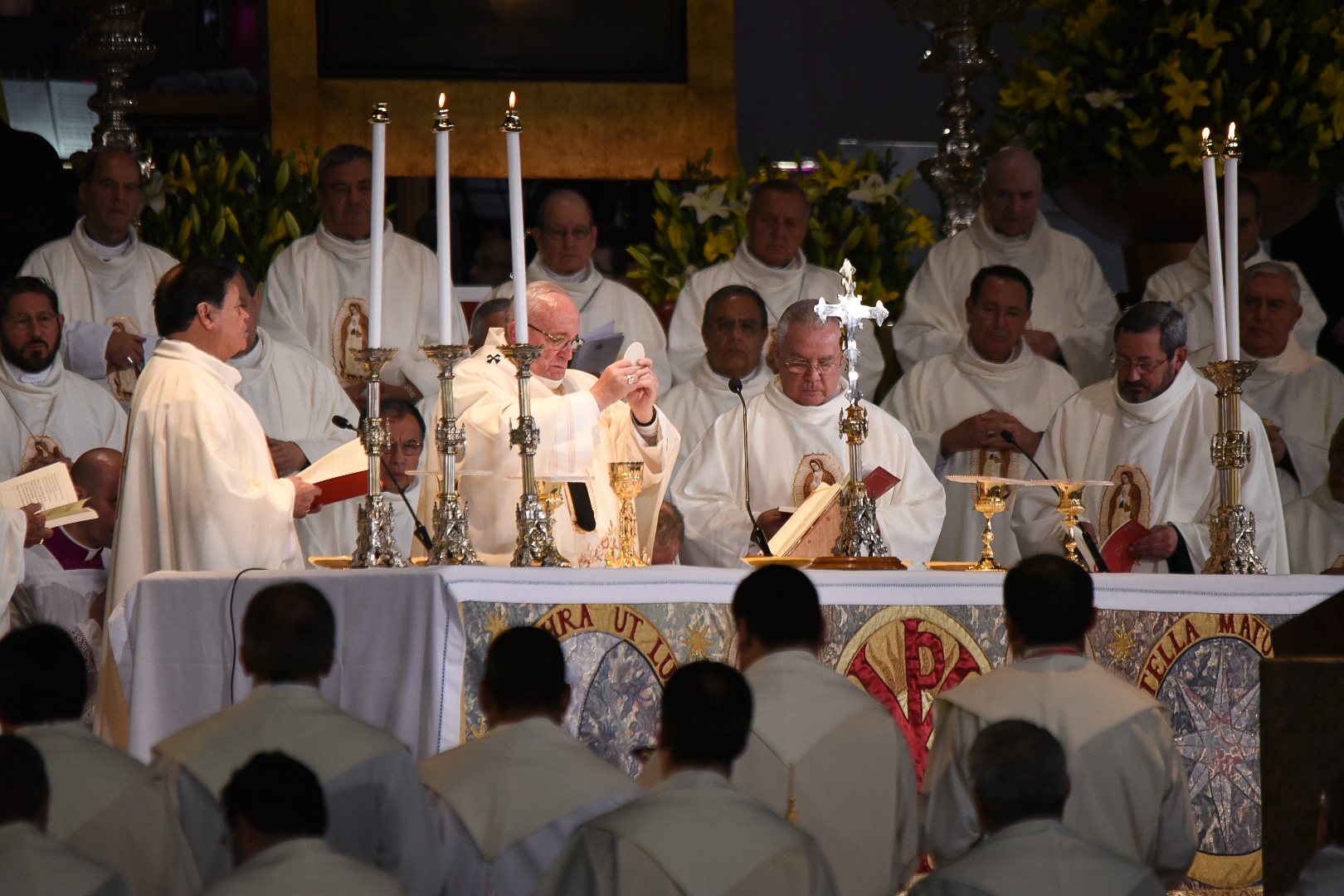
Pope Francis celebrates the Mass of Paul VI during his Apostolic journey to Mexico.

The Mass of Paul VI, also known as the Novus Ordo, is the form of Mass in the Roman Rite celebrated according to editions of the Roman Missal derived from the missal promulgated by Pope Paul VI in 1969 and subsequently revised under Pope John Paul II. It is the most widely used form of Mass in the Latin Church. It is generally celebrated in the vernacular, although rarely in Ecclesiastical Latin.

Novus Ordo is Ecclesiastical Latin for 'new order'. During the Second Vatican Council, Paul VI formed the Consilium in 1964 to carry out the revision of the liturgical books of the Roman Rite, including the Mass, as called for by the council's document Sacrosanctum Concilium. The development of the new Mass was a rupture from gradual, organic development, the norm of the Roman Rite, with post-conciliar reform just taking five years. Cardinal Joseph Ratzinger (later Benedict XVI) criticised the postconciliar reform as a departure from organic liturgical development, describing its result as "a fabrication, a banal on-the-spot product". After the consilium's work, Paul VI promulgated its revised Roman Missal in 1969, with its first typical edition published in 1970. It largely replaced the Tridentine Mass, whose last typical edition had been promulgated by Pope John XXIII in 1962.

In 1970 the liturgical books were published; those books were then revised in 1975, they were revised again by Pope John Paul II in 2000, and a third revision was published in 2002.

In 2007, Pope Benedict XVI's (the former Cardinal Ratzinger) motu proprio Summorum Pontificum described the missal promulgated by Paul VI as the Ordinary Form of the Roman Rite, while designating the 1962 missal as its extraordinary form. In 2021, Pope Francis's motu proprio Traditionis custodes declared the liturgical books promulgated by Paul VI and John Paul II in conformity with the Second Vatican Council to be the "unique expression of the lex orandi of the Roman Rite" and restricted the use of the 1962 Roman Missal.

== Names ==
In its official documents, the Catholic Church identifies the forms of the Roman Rite Mass by the editions of the Roman Missal used in celebrating them. Thus Pope Benedict XVI referred to this form of the Roman Rite Mass by linking it, in his motu proprio Summorum Pontificum of 7 July 2007, with "the Roman Missal promulgated by Pope Paul VI in 1970" or, in his accompanying letter of the same date to the bishops of the church, "the Missal published by Paul VI and then republished in two subsequent editions by John Paul II".

The now less frequently used names 'Mass of Paul VI' and 'Pauline Mass' refer to Pope Paul VI, who promulgated the first edition (which was followed by later editions promulgated by Pope John Paul II).

In his letter to bishops which accompanied his 2007 motu proprio Summorum Pontificum, Pope Benedict XVI wrote that "the Missal published by Paul VI and then republished in two subsequent editions by John Paul II, obviously is and continues to be the normal Form – the Forma ordinaria – of the Eucharistic Liturgy." Since then, the term Ordinary Form (abbreviated OF) is used to distinguish this form of the Roman Rite of Mass from the 1962 edition of the Tridentine Mass, the Extraordinary Form (EF), because in his motu proprio Pope Benedict declared the latter an "extraordinary form" of the Roman Rite. Pope Francis further emphasized the importance of the Ordinary Form in this capacity with his 2021 motu proprio Traditionis custodes, referring to it as "the unique expression of the lex orandi of the Roman Rite."

== Text ==
The current official text in Latin is that in the third typical edition of the Roman Missal, published in 2002 and reprinted with corrections and updating in 2008. Translations into the vernacular languages have appeared; the current English translation was promulgated in 2010 and was introduced progressively from September 2011. Two earlier typical editions of the Missal were issued in 1970 (promulgated in 1969) and 1975. The liturgy contained in the 1570–1962 editions of the Roman Missal is frequently referred to as the Tridentine Mass: all these editions placed at the start the text of the papal bull Quo primum in which Pope Pius V linked the issuance of his edition of the Roman Missal to the Council of Trent. Only in the 1962 edition is this text preceded by a short decree, Novo rubricarum corpore, declaring that edition to be, from then on, the typical edition, to which other printings of the Missal were to conform.

The Roman Missal promulgated by John Paul II differs in many points from that promulgated by Paul VI. The changes include the addition of 13 new feasts of saints, a new preface of martyrs, several new Mass formulas, including five of the Blessed Virgin Mary, two votive Masses (one of which was taken from the 1962 Roman Missal), and complete formulas for the ferial days of Advent and Eastertide. Prayers over the faithful are added to the Lenten Mass formulas and the Apostles' Creed is provided as an alternative to the Nicene Creed. The Mass of Paul VI thus became the Mass of Paul VI and John Paul II.

== History ==
=== Background ===
==== Liturgical Movement ====
The Liturgical Movement of the nineteenth and twentieth centuries, which arose from the work of Dom Prosper Guéranger, a former abbot of Solesmes Abbey, encouraged the laity to live the liturgy by attending services (not only Mass) often, understanding what they meant, and following the priest in heart and mind.

==== Beginnings of the modern revision, 1948–1962 ====
Liturgical reforms took place under Pius XII, specially in 1955, when the liturgy of Holy Week was reformed.

=== Vatican II, Sacrosanctum Concilium, and a revised liturgy ===
The liturgy was the first matter considered by the Second Vatican Council of 1962–1965. On 4 December 1963, the Council issued a Constitution on the Sacred Liturgy known as Sacrosanctum Concilium, section 50 of which read as follows:

The rite of the Mass is to be revised in such a way that the intrinsic nature and purpose of its several parts, as also the connection between them, may be more clearly manifested, and that devout and active participation by the faithful may be more easily achieved. For this purpose the rites are to be simplified, due care being taken to preserve their substance; elements which, with the passage of time, came to be duplicated, or were added with but little advantage, are now to be discarded; other elements which have suffered injury through accidents of history are now to be restored to the vigor which they had in the days of the holy Fathers, as may seem useful or necessary.

Sacrosanctum Concilium further provided that (amongst other things) a greater use of the Scriptures should be made at Mass, communion under both kinds for the laity (under limited circumstances), and that vernacular languages should be more widely employed (while retaining the use of Latin), a declaration whose implementation made the Second Vatican Council "a milestone for Catholic, Protestants, [and] the Orthodox".

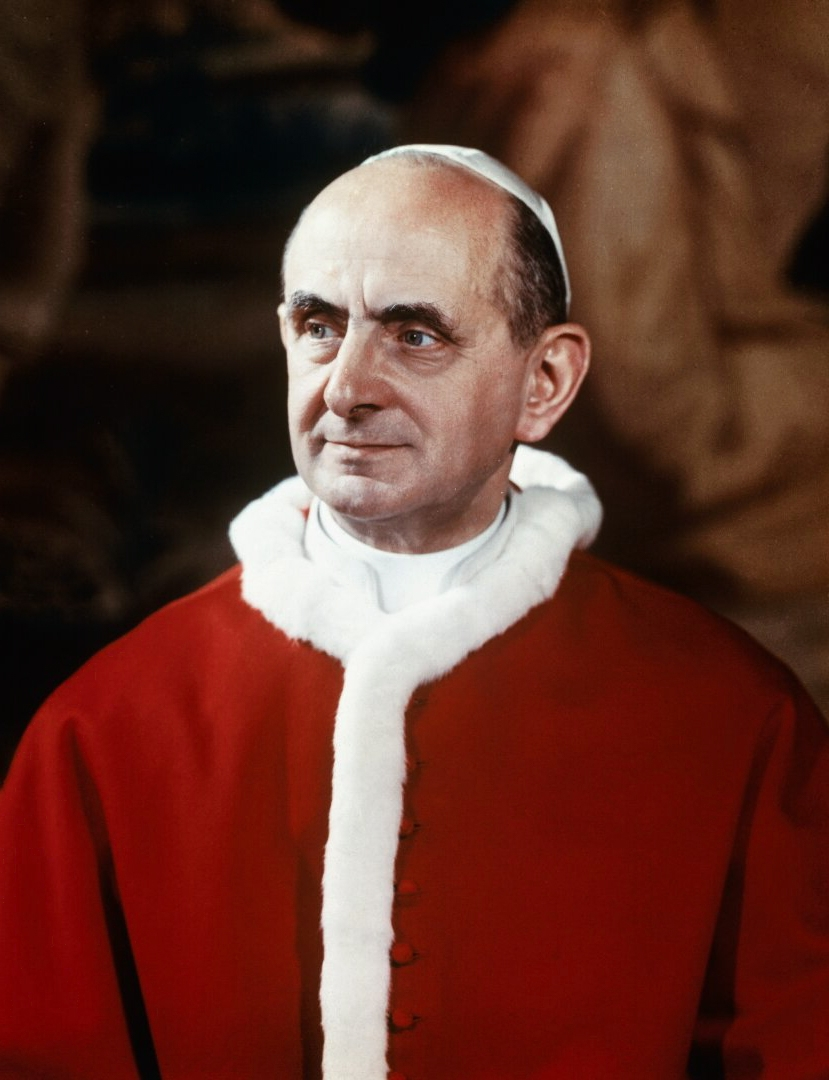
A portrait of Paul VI. The New Mass was published by him in 1970 and thus is often referred to as the "Mass of Paul VI".

In 1964, Pope Paul VI, who had succeeded John XXIII the previous year, established the Consilium ad exsequendam Constitutionem de Sacra Liturgia, the Council for Implementing the Constitution on the Sacred Liturgy. The instruction Inter oecumenici of 26 September 1964, issued by the Sacred Congregation of Rites while the Council was still in session, and coming into effect on 7 March 1965, made significant changes to the existing liturgy. The 1967 document Tres abhinc annos, the second instruction on the implementation of the Constitution, made only minimal changes to the text, but simplified the rubrics and the vestments. Concelebration and Communion under both kinds had meanwhile been permitted.

By October 1967, the Consilium had produced a complete draft revision of the Mass liturgy, known as the Normative Mass, and this revision was presented to the Synod of Bishops that met in Rome in that month. The bishops attended the first public celebration of the revised rite in the Sistine Chapel. When asked to vote on the new liturgy, 71 bishops voted placet ('approved'), 43 voted non-placet ('not approved'), and 62 voted placet iuxta modum ('approved with reservations'). In response to the bishops' concerns, some changes were made to the text. Pope Paul VI and the Consilium interpreted this as lack of approval for the Normative Mass, which was replaced by the text included in the book Novus Ordo Missae (The New Order of Mass) in 1969.

On 25 September 1969, two retired cardinals, 79-year-old Alfredo Ottaviani and 84-year-old Antonio Bacci, wrote a letter with which they sent Pope Paul VI the text of a "Short Critical Study on the New Order of Mass". The cardinals warned the New Order of the Mass "represented, both as a whole and in its details, a striking departure from the Catholic theology of the Mass as it was formulated in Session XXII of the Council of Trent". The study that they transmitted said that on many points the New Mass had much to gladden the heart of even the most modernist Protestant. Paul VI asked the Congregation for the Doctrine of the Faith, the department of the Roman Curia that Ottaviani had earlier headed, to examine the Short Critical Study. It responded on 12 November 1969 that the document contained many affirmations that were "superficial, exaggerated, inexact, emotional, and false". However, some of its observations were taken into account in preparing the definitive version of the new Order of the Mass. In 1974, Annibale Bugnini announced that the Novus Ordo Missae was "a major conquest of the Roman Catholic Church". Ottaviani would later acknowledge his satisfaction with the new missal after reassurance by Paul VI in a letter dated February 17, 1970.

=== Paul VI's publication of the 1970 Missal ===
Pope Paul VI promulgated the revised rite of Mass with his apostolic constitution Missale Romanum of 3 April 1969, setting the first Sunday of Advent of that year as the date on which it would enter into force. However, because he was dissatisfied with the edition that was produced, the revised Missal itself was not published until the following year, and full vernacular translations appeared much later.

The revisions called for by Vatican II were guided by historical and Biblical studies that were not available at the Council of Trent when the rite was fixed to forestall any heretical accretions. Missale Romanum made particular mention of the following significant changes from the previous edition of the Roman Missal:

- "Other elements that have suffered injury through accident of history" are restored "to the tradition of the Fathers" (SC art. 50), for example, the homily (see SC art. 52), the general intercessions or prayer of the faithful (see SC art. 53), and the penitential rite or act of reconciliation with God and the community at the beginning of the Mass.
- The proportion of the Bible read at Mass was greatly increased, although some verses included in the older readings have been omitted in the new. Before the reforms of Pius XII, which reduced the proportions further, 1% of the Old Testament and 16.5% of the New Testament had been read at Mass. Since 1970, the equivalent proportions for Sundays and weekdays (leaving aside major feasts) have been 13.5% of the Old Testament and 71.5% of the New Testament.

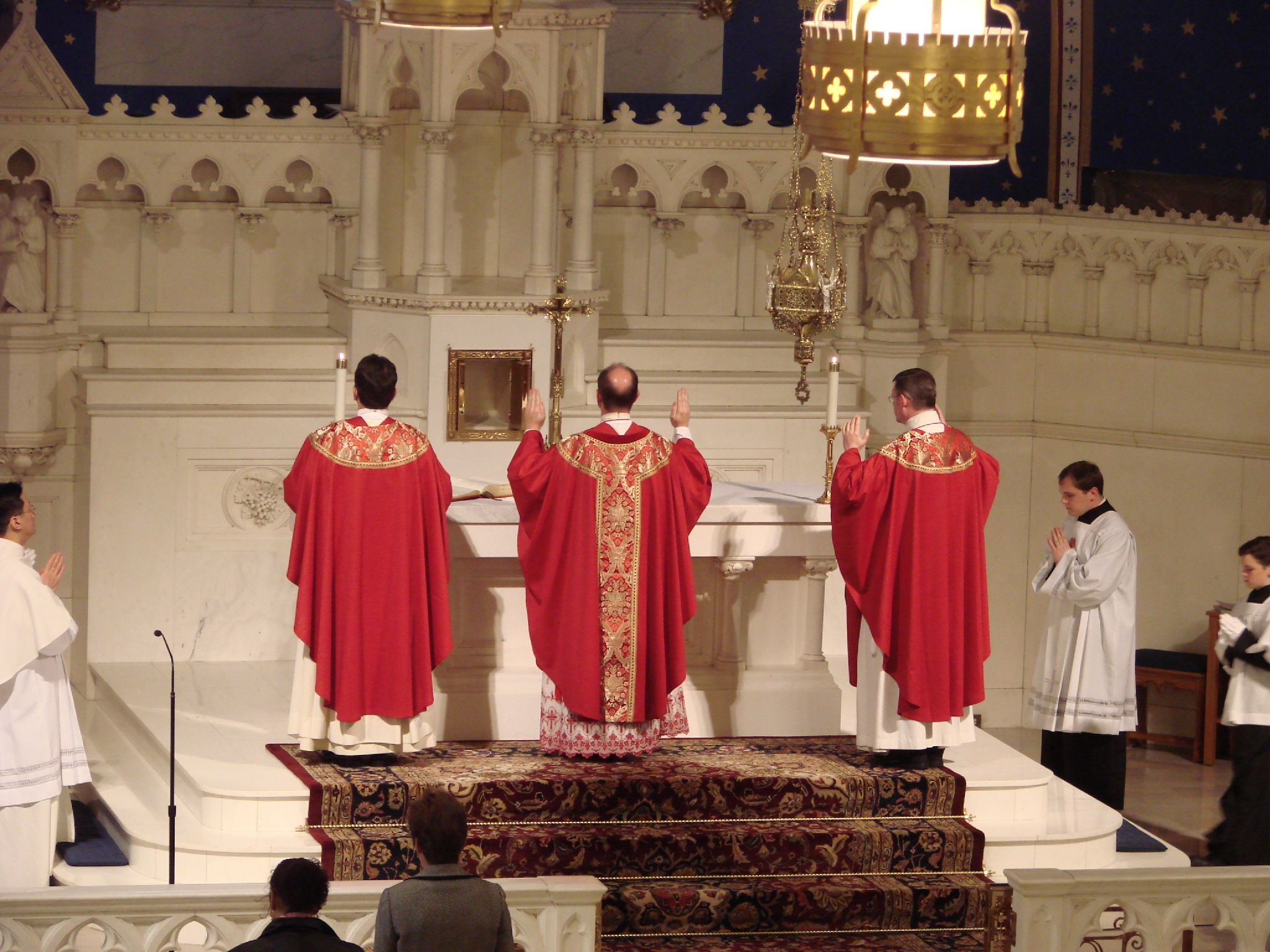
Celebration of the Lord's Passion on Good Friday.

== Other changes ==
=== Vernacular language ===
In his 1962 apostolic constitution Veterum sapientia on the teaching of Latin, Pope John XXIII spoke of that language as the one the church uses: "The Catholic Church has a dignity far surpassing that of every merely human society, for it was founded by Christ the Lord. It is altogether fitting, therefore, that the language it uses should be noble, majestic, and non-vernacular." However, the only mention of the liturgy in that document was in relation to the study of Greek.

The Second Vatican Council stated in Sacrosanctum Concilium, 36:

1. Particular law remaining in force, the use of the Latin language is to be preserved in the Latin rites.
2. But since the use of the mother tongue, whether in the Mass, the administration of the sacraments, or other parts of the liturgy, frequently may be of great advantage to the people, the limits of its employment may be extended. This will apply in the first place to the readings and directives, and to some of the prayers and chants, according to the regulations on this matter to be laid down separately in subsequent chapters.
3. These norms being observed, it is for the competent territorial ecclesiastical authority mentioned in Art. 22, 2, to decide whether, and to what extent, the vernacular language is to be used; their decrees are to be approved, that is, confirmed, by the Apostolic See. And, whenever it seems to be called for, this authority is to consult with bishops of neighboring regions which have the same language.

At the same time, Sacrosanctum Concilium 54 makes clear that, though the vernacular is permitted, "steps should be taken so that the faithful may also be able to say or to sing together in Latin those parts of the Ordinary of the Mass which pertain to them."

=== Three new Eucharistic Prayers ===
As noted above, three new Eucharistic Prayers were introduced as alternatives to the Roman Canon (known as "Eucharistic Prayer I" within the missal), which had for 1,600 years been the only Eucharistic Prayer of the Roman Rite. After Sacrosanctum concilium, between the years 1963 and 1968 there were private initiatives by liberal reformers to either revise the Roman Canon, or to create new Eucharistic Prayers. Hans Küng and Karl Amon both published articles demanding this. In addition, the Bishops' Conference of the Netherlands under Johannes Bluyssen, around 1965–1966, did not wait for the Canon to be permitted in the vernacular and started experimenting with their own translations and adding new "Eucharistic Prayers", then asking for permission from Rome to do so after the fact, causing political pressure. Benedictine member of the Consilium Cipriano Vagaggini, while noting what he called the Roman Canon's "undeniable defects", concluded that its suppression was unthinkable; he proposed that it be retained but that two further Eucharistic Prayers be added. The General Instruction of the Roman Missal of 1969 states that the "Eucharistic Prayer I" (the Roman Canon) may always be used, including on Sundays, but it rarely is in local diocesan parishes since 1969–1970.

In response to requests from various quarters, Pope Paul VI authorized the composition of new Eucharistic Prayers, which were examined by himself and by the Congregation for the Doctrine of the Faith, and which he authorized for use in 1968.

The original Bugnini draft, drawing from the skeleton which is typically thought to be the lost Apostolic Tradition of Hyppolitus but is also considered to be of later, non-Roman origin, would have excluded even the Sanctus and the intercessions. The General Instruction of the Roman Missal of 1969 states that Eucharistic Prayer II is "useful on weekdays."

The third Eucharistic Prayer's structure follows the Roman Canon. The fourth is based on the 4th-century Anaphora of St. Basil. Both the third and fourth Eucharistic Prayers were written by Cipriano Vagaggini of the Pontifical Athenaeum of Saint Anselm at Rome in 1966.

=== Communion under both species ===
A council at Lambeth in 1281 directed that the people were to be given unconsecrated wine. The Council of Trent taught that only the priest who celebrated Mass was bound by divine law to receive Communion under both species, and that Christ, whole and entire, and a true sacrament are received under either form alone, and therefore, as regards its fruits, those who receive one species only are not deprived of any grace necessary to salvation; and it decreed: "If anyone says that the holy Catholic Church was not moved by just causes and reasons that laymen and clerics when not consecrating should communicate under the form of bread only, or has erred in this, let him be anathema." While the Council had declared that reception of Communion under one form alone deprived the communicant of no grace necessary to salvation, the 1908 Catholic Encyclopedia states theologians had surmised that receiving both forms may confer a greater grace, either in itself (a minority view) or only accidentally (the majority view).

=== Liturgical orientation ===
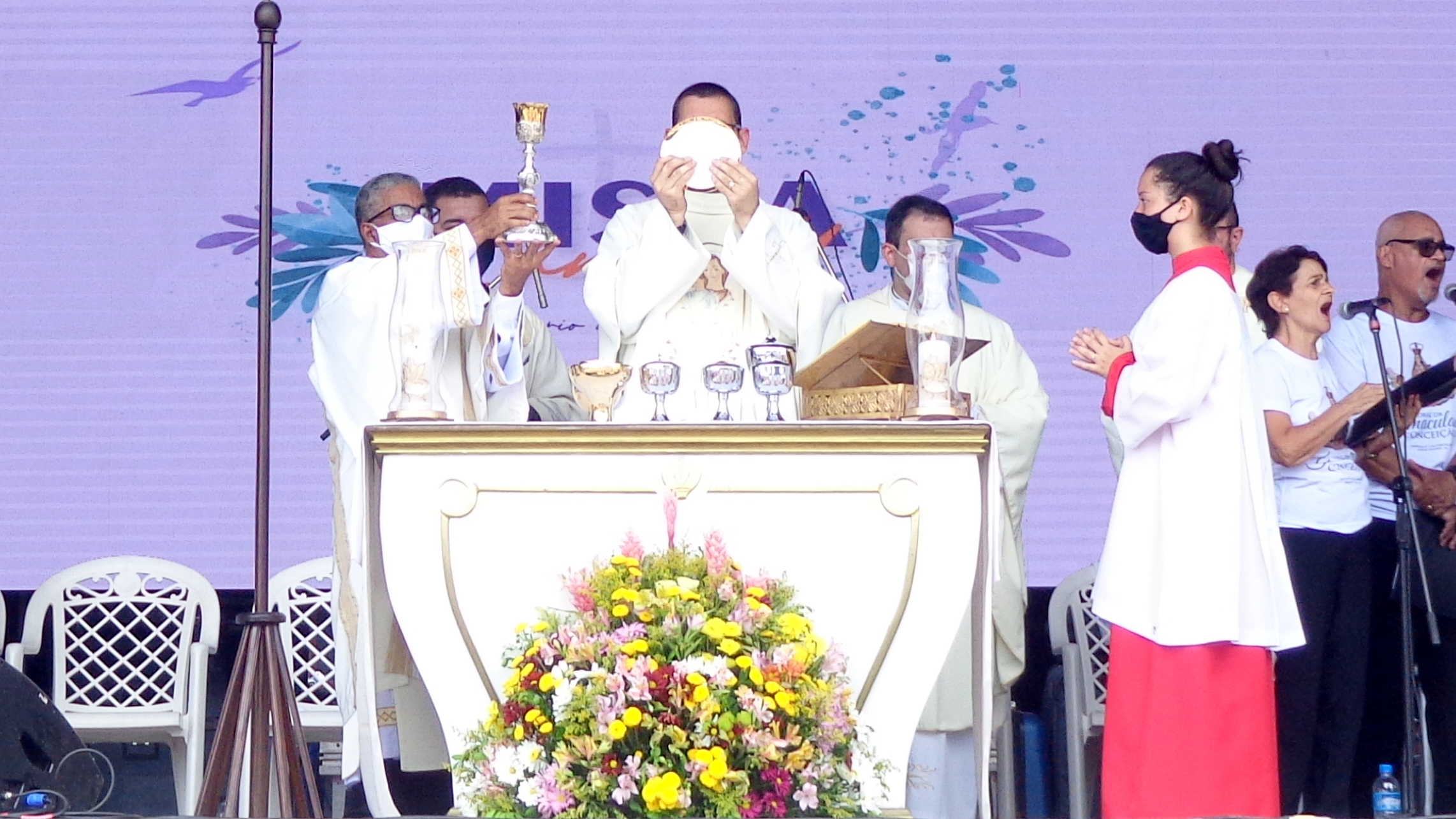
A priest in Brazil celebrating the Mass of Paul VI in 2022. He celebrates versus populum (facing the people), a simple wooden table is used as an altar and a female altar server is present.

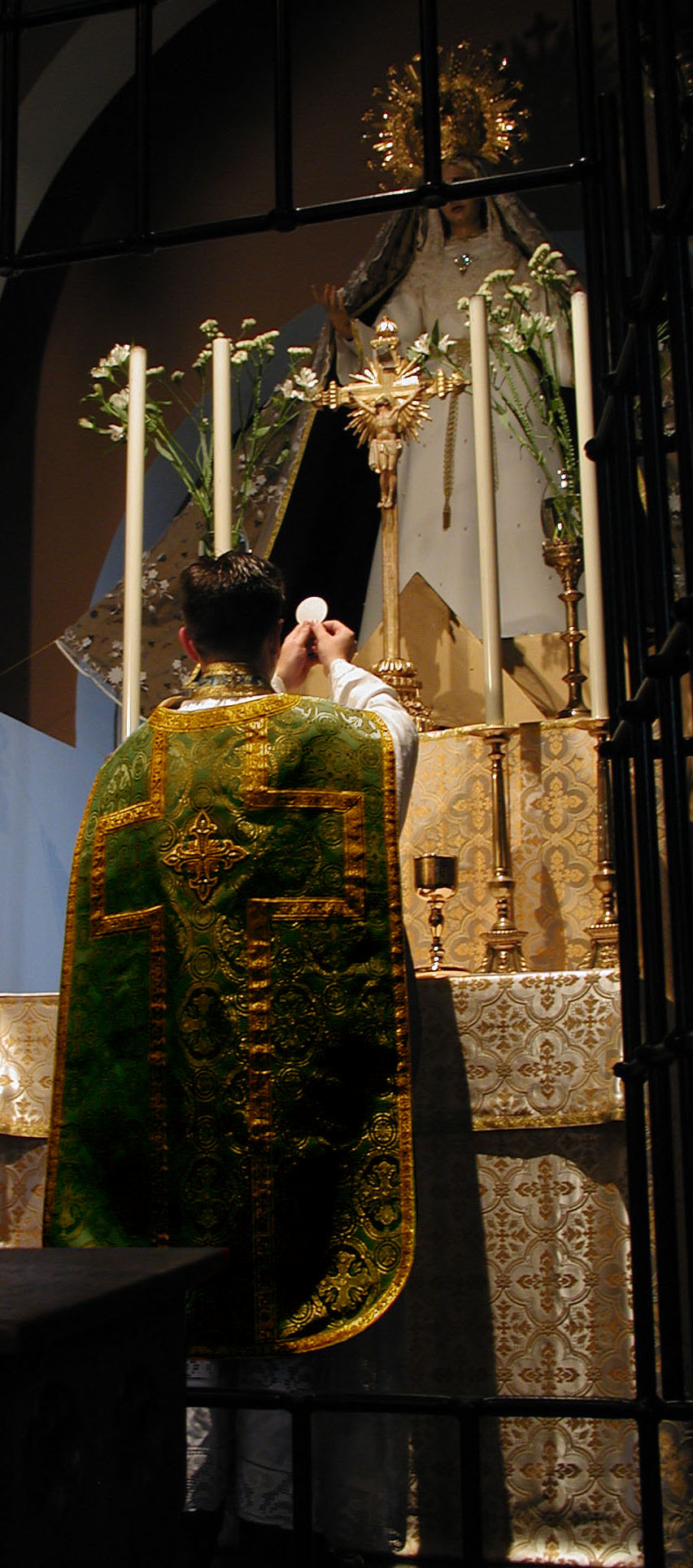
A priest celebrating the Mass of Paul VI ad orientem at the hermitage of Our Lady of the Enclosed Garden.

The Tridentine Missal speaks of celebrating versus populum, (Note: The Latin versus does not mean 'against', as does English versus; it means 'turned, toward', from past participle of vertere, 'to turn') and gives corresponding instructions for the priest when performing actions that in the other orientation involved turning around in order to face the people.

In The Spirit of the Liturgy, Cardinal Joseph Ratzinger (later Pope Benedict XVI) attributed to the influence of Saint Peter's Basilica the fact that other churches in Rome are built with the apse to the west and also attributed to topographical circumstances that arrangement for Saint Peter's. However, the arrangement whereby the apse with the altar is at the west end of the church and the entrance on the east is found also in Roman churches contemporary with Saint Peter's (such as the original Basilica of Saint Paul Outside the Walls) that were under no such constraints of terrain, and the same arrangement remained the usual one until the 6th century. In this early layout, the people were situated in the side aisles of the church, not in the central nave. While the priest faced both the altar and east throughout the Mass, the people would face the altar (from the sides) until the high point of the Mass, where they would then turn to face east along with the priest.

In its guidelines for the arrangement of churches, the current Roman Missal directs: "The altar should be built apart from the wall, in such a way that it is possible to walk around it easily and that Mass can be celebrated at it facing the people, which is desirable wherever possible." The English also states that both the construction of the altar away from the wall and the celebration versus populum are "desirable wherever possible." A 2000 statement by the Congregation for Divine Worship and the Discipline of the Sacraments stated that "There is no preference expressed in the liturgical legislation for either position. As both positions enjoy the favor of law, the legislation may not be invoked to say that one position or the other accords more closely with the mind of the Church."

The rubrics of the Roman Missal now prescribe that the priest should face the people at six points of the Mass. (Note: The six times are: When giving the opening greeting (GIRM, 124); When giving the invitation to pray, Orate, fratres (GIRM, 146); When giving the greeting of peace, Pax Domini sit semper vobiscum (GIRM, 154); When displaying the consecrated Host (or Host and Chalice) before Communion and saying: Ecce Agnus Dei (GIRM, 157); When inviting to pray (Oremus) before the postcommunion prayer (GIRM, 165); When giving the final blessing (Ordo Missae 141).) The priest celebrating the Tridentine Mass was required to face the people, turning his back to the altar if necessary, eight times. (Note: The eight times are: When greeting the people (Dominus vobiscum) before the collect, the offertory rite and the postcommunion prayer (Ritus servandus in celebratione Missae, V, 1), VII, 1, XI, 1); When giving the invitation to pray, Orate, fratres (Ritus servandus, VII, 7); Twice before giving Communion to others, first when saying the two prayers after the Confiteor, and again while displaying a consecrated Host and saying Ecce Agnus Dei (Ritus servandus, X, 6); When saying Ite, missa est (Ritus servandus, XI, 1); When giving the last part of the final blessing (Ritus servandus, XII, 1).; Though the priest was required to face the people and spoke words addressed to them, he was forbidden to look at them, being instructed to turn to them dimissis ad terram oculis ('with eyes turned down to the ground") – Ritus servandus, V, 1; VII, 7; XII, 1.)

=== Repositioning of the tabernacle ===
The revised Roman Missal states that it is "more appropriate as a sign that on an altar on which Mass is celebrated there not be a tabernacle in which the Most Holy Eucharist is reserved", in which case it is "preferable that the tabernacle be located":

- Either in the sanctuary, apart from the altar of celebration, in an appropriate form and place, not excluding its being positioned on an old altar no longer used for celebration;
- Or in some chapel suitable for the private adoration and prayer of the faithful and organically connected to the church and readily noticeable to the Christian faithful.

The Missal does direct that the tabernacle be situated "in a part of the church that is truly noble, prominent, conspicuous, worthily decorated, and suitable for prayer".

=== Changes to the role of the deacon ===
In the usus antiquor (a.k.a. Tridentine Form) the liturgical role of the deacon was largely limited to his role in the missa solemnis (a.k.a. the Solemn High Mass) and some rites in the Rituale Romanum. Furthermore, in the usus antiquor the deacon's role was rarely used apart from the subdeacon. In the Mass of Paul VI, the deacon was now to be included (if he was present), at any level of solemnity, and not just the solemn form of the Mass. Furthermore, it was often the practice in the usus antiquor, that the role of the deacon and subdeacon were filled by clerics who were actually ordained as priests or bishops (additionally, sometimes the subdeacon's role was performed by minor clerics who were not yet subdeacons, a practice called a straw subdeacon). However, the Missal of Paul VI required that the role of the deacon be filled by one who was, in fact, a deacon (and not a priest or bishop). This restriction of the role of the deacon to clerics who were, in fact, only deacons makes sense in light of the restoration of the Latin deaconate to a stable ministry – as opposed to the inherited practice of the deacon being almost entirely (except for a few, limited cases) a transitional phase in cursu honorum to the priesthood. Nonetheless, the practice of bishops and priests assuming the vestments and roles of deacons does continue in some papal ceremonies.

When the deacon proclaimed the Gospel at Mass, it was no longer proclaimed facing the side of the sanctuary, also known as liturgical North, (symbolizing the announcement of the Gospel to the unevangelized), but rather from the ambo towards the people. Furthermore, the priest no longer had to read the Gospel before the deacon proclaimed it, the subdeacon (being soon eliminated) no longer held the Book of the Gospels (a.k.a. Evangelium), and the Gospel no longer had to be sung by the deacon, but could (optionally) be read.

Having been lost by the time of the Leonine Sacramentary in 560 A.D., the Oratio Universalis (a.k.a. Prayer of the Faithful) was restored to its former location after the Creed and before the Offertory (indicated in the usus antiquor by the priest turning immediately before the Offertory, and saying Oremus and the immediately proceeding to the Offertory), as a properly deacon's part. However, in practice the intentions in the Oratio Universalis are still commonly read by laypersons (sometimes even when deacons are present, contrary to directives). The Oratio Universalis may be sung in the style of a litany, with provided music in the 2002 Missale Romanum.

The deacon's duties at the Offertory also changed. Absent the subdeacon after 1972, the deacon was responsible for placing both the wine and the water into the chalice (instead of having the subdeacon place the water in the chalice). After presenting the chalice to the priest, the deacon formerly (in the usus antiquor) would support either the priest's arm or the base of the chalice and saying with the priest, "Offerimus tibi...", but in the Missal of Paul VI, the deacon presents the chalice to the priest, who offers it alone, saying "Benedictus Es..."

=== Changes to the role of the subdeacon ===
From its promulgation in 1969 until 1972, the Mass of Paul VI had briefly included a role for a subdeacon, whose task was to "serve at the altar and to assist the priest and deacon. In particular he prepares the altar and the sacred vessels and reads the epistle." However, the role was soon eliminated due to the suppression of the subdiaconate by Pope Paul VI in 1972 in the motu proprio Ministeria Quaedam.

=== Other matters ===
A procession is now allowed at the Offertory or Presentation of the Gifts, when bread, wine, and water are brought to the altar. The homily has been made an integral part of the Mass instead of being treated as an adjunct, and the ancient Prayer of the Faithful has been restored. The exchange of a sign of peace before Communion, previously limited to the clergy at High Mass, is permitted (not made obligatory) at every Mass, even for the laity. "As for the actual sign of peace to be given, the manner is to be established by Conferences of Bishops in accordance with the culture and customs of the peoples. However, it is appropriate that each person, in a sober manner, offer the sign of peace only to those who are nearest." (GIRM, 82.) "While the Sign of Peace is being given, it is permissible to say, The peace of the Lord be with you always, to which the reply is Amen" (GIRM, 154).

== Criticism of the revision ==
There are two distinct forms of criticisms of the liturgical reform: criticisms of the text of the revised Missal and criticisms of ways in which the rite has been celebrated in practice.

=== Criticisms of the text of the Missal ===
==== Ottaviani Intervention ====
In 1969 Cardinals Alfredo Ottaviani and Antonio Bacci sent to Pope Paul VI a Short Critical Study of the Novus Ordo Missae, commonly known as the "Ottaviani Intervention". In it, they described the new Missal as "a striking departure from the Catholic theology of the Holy Mass, as it was formulated by the Council of Trent". The mind behind the document is alleged to be theologian Michel-Louis Guérard des Lauriers, who later became a sedeprivationist bishop and was excommunicated.

Pope Paul VI asked the Congregation for the Doctrine of the Faith, the department of the Roman Curia that Ottaviani had earlier headed, to examine the Short Critical Study. It responded on 12 November 1969 that the document contained many affirmations that were "superficial, exaggerated, inexact, emotional and false". Nonetheless, the contents of the Intervention were used by Paul VI to amend the Missal and remove the most controversial parts from it; Cardinal Ottaviani later stated to be satisfied by the amendments.

==== Other criticism ====
In his preface to the French edition of The Reform of the Roman Liturgy by Klaus Gamber, Cardinal Joseph Ratzinger, later Pope Benedict XVI, said: "In the place of liturgy as the fruit of development came fabricated liturgy. We abandoned the organic, living process of growth and development over the centuries and replaced it – as in a manufacturing process – with a fabrication, a banal on-the-spot product." As Pope Benedict, he later wrote: "There is no contradiction between the two editions of the Roman Missal. In the history of the liturgy there is growth and progress, but no rupture."

The Society of Saint Pius X has argued that the promulgation of the revised liturgy was legally invalid due to alleged technical deficiencies in the wording of Missale Romanum. However, the Society has later stated that the Mass of Paul VI is valid, though illicit.

== Revision of the English translation ==
The International Commission on English in the Liturgy worked for 17 years on a new translation, presented in 1998, formed in response to critiques of the earlier translation. However, their proposed translation ran afoul of new leadership in Rome. On 28 March 2001, the Holy See issued the Instruction Liturgiam authenticam, including the requirement that, in translations of the liturgical texts from the official Latin originals, "the original text, insofar as possible, must be translated integrally and in the most exact manner, without omissions or additions in terms of their content, and without paraphrases or glosses. Any adaptation to the characteristics or the nature of the various vernacular languages is to be sober and discreet." The following year, the third typical edition of the revised Roman Missal in Latin was released.

In 2002 the leadership of the ICEL was changed, under insistence from the Roman Congregation for Divine Worship and to obtain a translation that was as close as possible to the wording of the Latin original. In spite of push-back by some in the church, Rome prevailed and nine years later a new English translation, closer to that of the Latin and consequently approved by the Holy See, was adopted by English-speaking episcopal conferences.

Most episcopal conferences set the first Sunday in Advent (27 November) 2011 as the date when the new translation would come into use. However, the Southern African Catholic Bishops' Conference (Botswana, South Africa, Swaziland) put into effect the changes in the people's parts of the revised English translation of the Order of Mass from 28 November 2008, when the Missal as a whole was not yet available. Protests were voiced on grounds of content and because it meant that Southern Africa was thus out of line with other English-speaking areas. One bishop claimed that the English-speaking conferences should have withstood the Holy See's insistence on a more literal translation. However, when in February 2009 the Holy See declared that the change should have waited until the whole of the Missal had been translated, the bishops' conference appealed, with the result that those parishes that had adopted the new translation of the Order of Mass were directed to continue using it, while those that had not were told to await further instructions before doing so.

In December 2016, Pope Francis authorized a commission to study Liturgiam authenticam, the document promulgated by Pope John Paul II which governs authorized vernacular translations of the liturgy.

== See also ==
- Code of Rubrics
- Preconciliar rites after the Second Vatican Council
