= Quo primum =

1570 papal bull generally requiring the Roman Rite

Quo Primum Tempore Latin for 'From the Beginning Whence' Apostolic constitution of Pope Pius V
- Signature date: 17 July 1570
- Subject: On the prumulgation of the new Roman Missal
- Text: In Latin; In English

Quo Primum Tempore (English: From the beginning whence) is the incipit of an Apostolic Constitution in the form of a Papal bull issued by Pope Pius V on 14 July 1570.

This Pontifical decree promulgated the Roman Missal and made its use obligatory throughout the Latin Church of the Catholic Church, except where there existed a different Catholic Mass liturgy of the Latin Church of at least two hundred years prior and standing.

== Overview and development ==
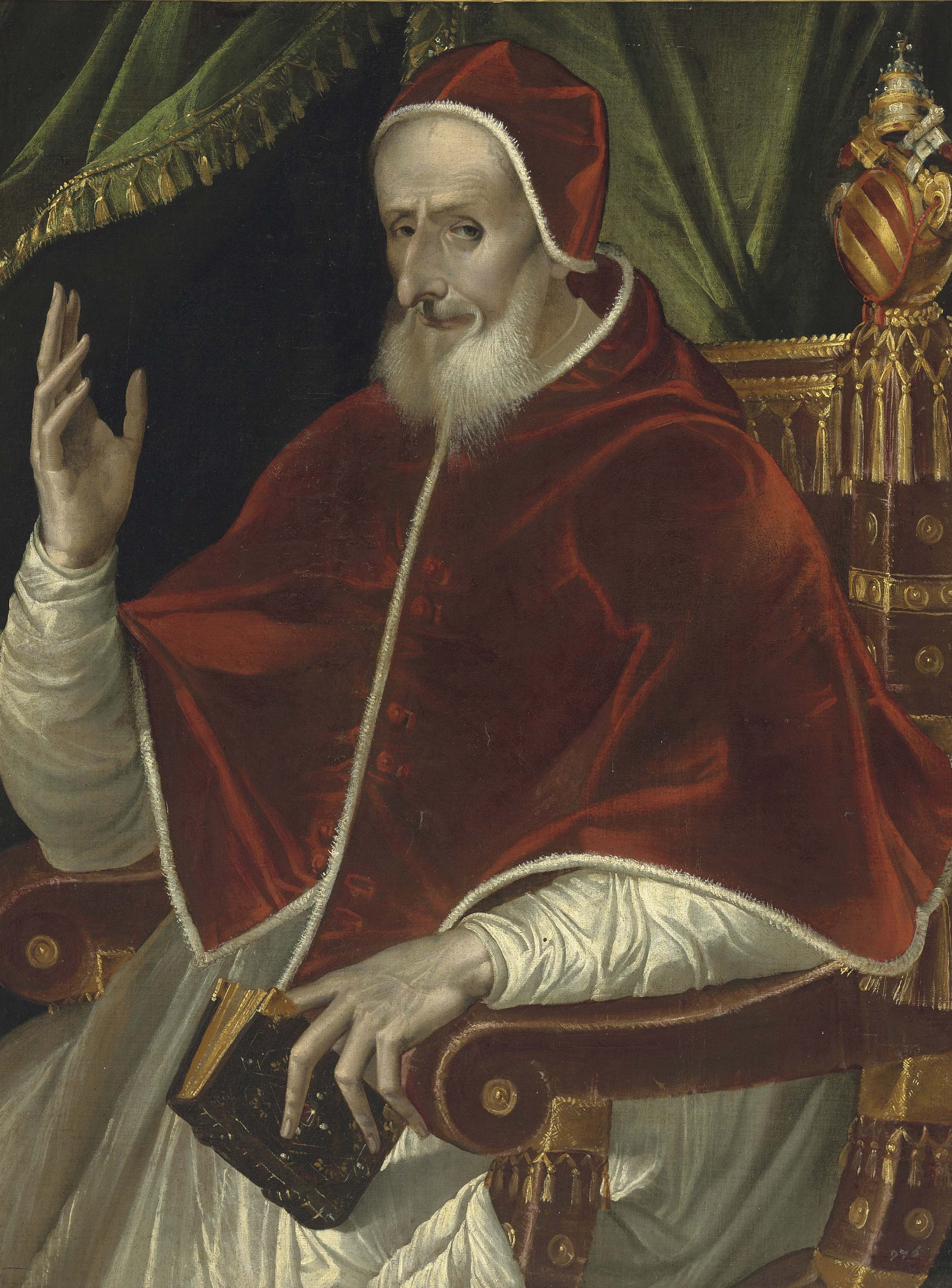
Pope Pius V (1566) as depicted by Roman painter Bartolomeo Passarotti. Oil on Canvas.

The purpose of the Papal bull was not only to execute the last of the four tasks entrusted to Pope Pius V by the Council of Trent in its last session on 4 December 1563 (over the revision of the index of forbidden books, catechism and breviary. There was still that of the missal) but also his personal desire to standardize the liturgy of the Latin Church, which he had already indicated in his Papal bull decreed in 9 July 1568 titled Quod Nobis Postulat on the Roman Breviary.

The declared reason for this measure was the following:

"It is most becoming that there be in the Church... only one rite for the celebration of Mass."

However, he made the exception mentioned, which permitted the survival, within limited areas or in celebrations by members of certain religious orders, of Latin liturgical rites other than the Roman Rite, rites such as the Ambrosian and Mozarabic Rites, that of the Diocese of Lyon and certain Catholic Order Rites. Some of these dioceses and religious orders have since decided to adopt the Roman Rite. Others preferred not to avail themselves of the exemption to which they were entitled and instead to adopt the Roman Missal immediately.

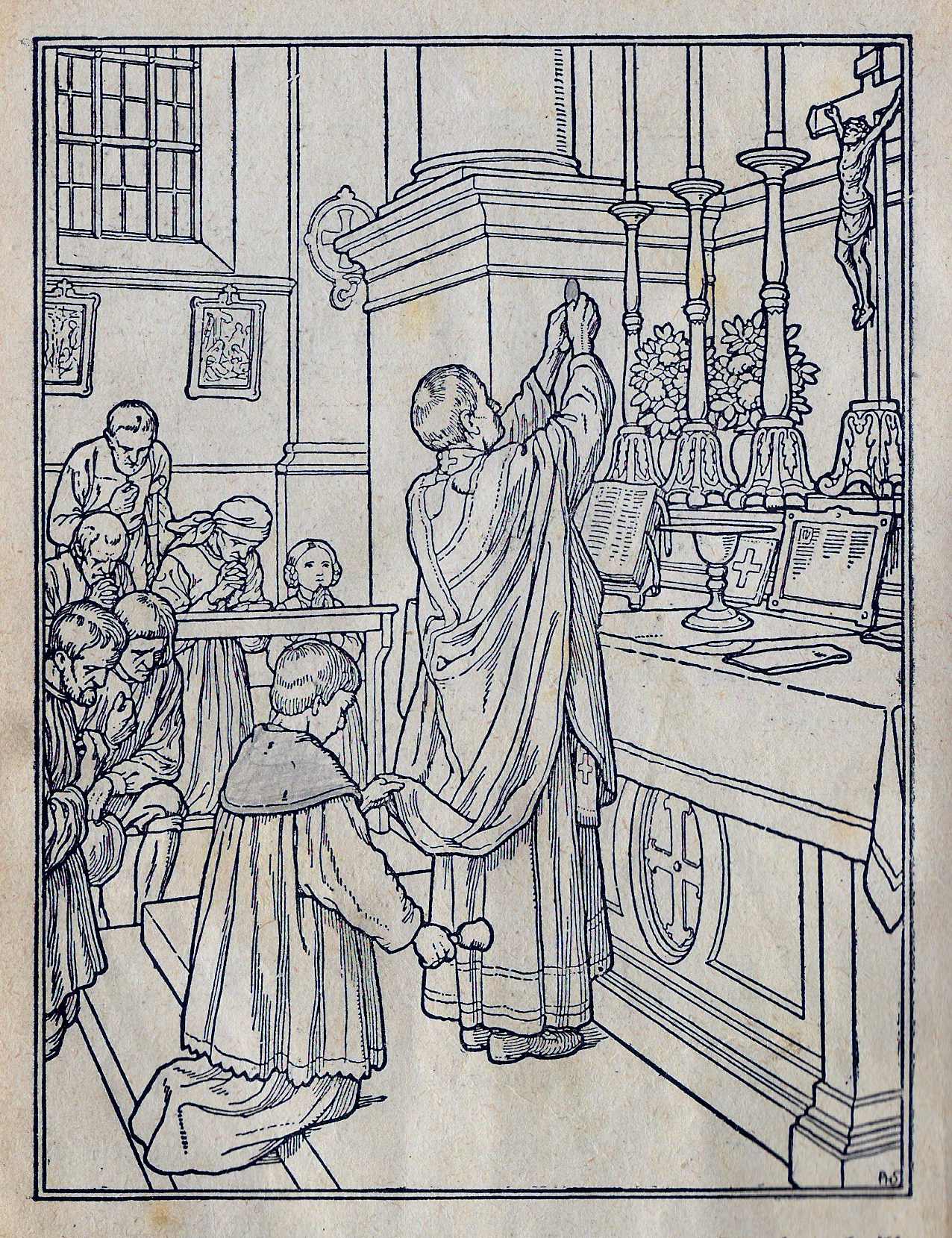
The elevation of the Holy Eucharist in the custom of Ad Orientem during a Catholic Mass.

Thus, although the bull Quo Primum Tempore contained expressions such as the following:

"Let all everywhere adopt and observe what has been handed down by the Holy Roman Church, the Mother and Teacher of the other Churches, and let Masses not be sung or read according to any other formula than that of this Missal published by Us. This ordinance applies henceforth, now, and forever, throughout all the provinces of the Christian world…"

Certain exceptions were allowed from the start, and not all priests—even those within Latin Rites—were obliged to adopt the Missal of Pius V.

In the Papal bull, Pope Pius V declared:

"By this present Constitution, which will be valid henceforth, now, and forever, We order and enjoin that nothing must be added to Our recently published Missal, nothing omitted from it, nor anything whatsoever be changed within it."

And he concluded:

"No one whosoever is permitted to alter this notice of Our permission, statute, ordinance, command, precept, grant, indult, declaration, will, decree, and prohibition. Should anyone dare to contravene it, let him know that he will incur the wrath of Almighty God and of the Blessed Apostles Peter and Paul."

Further editions of the Roman Missal were published by Pope Leo XIII (1884), by Pope Benedict XV (1920) and by Pope John XXIII (1962) with certain differences.

== Second Vatican Council ==
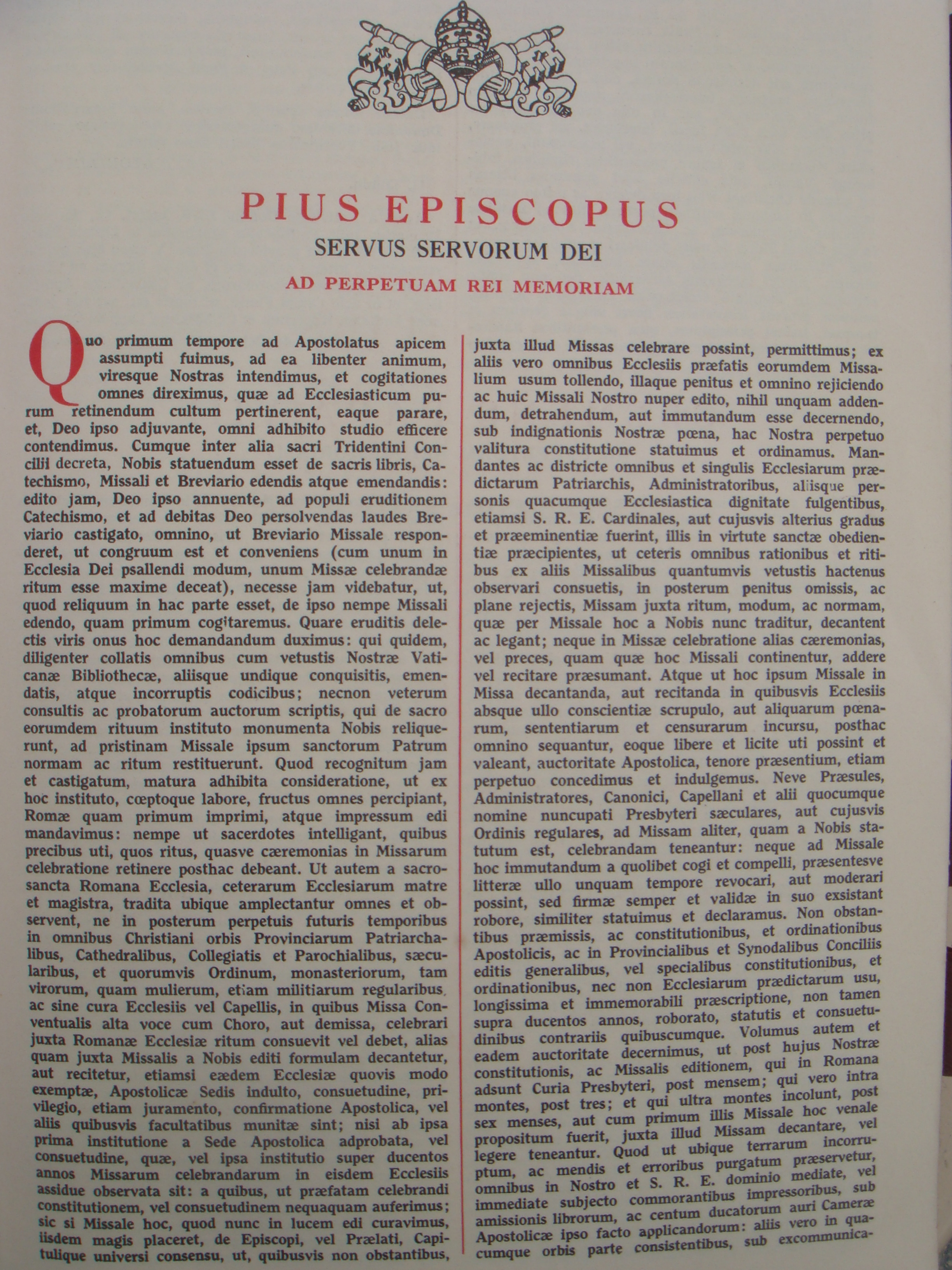
The text of the Pontifical decree.

The Apostolic Constitution Missale Romanum of Pope Paul VI replaced the Tridentine Mass with the new Mass of Paul VI, as requested by the Second Vatican Council through the Constitution Sacrosanctum Concilium.

- Pope Paul VI in his Missale Romanum declared that the new liturgical norms are to be "firm and effective, now and in the future, notwithstanding, to the extent necessary, the apostolic constitutions and ordinances issued by Our predecessors, and other prescriptions, even those deserving particular mention and derogation."
- Pope Benedict XVI in his motu proprio Summorum Pontificum Cura accommodated the use of the 1962 version of the Roman Missal, stating that it was never abrogated and was thus to be considered as the "extraordinary form of the Roman Rite", whereas the Mass of Paul VI was to be considered as the "ordinary form of the Roman Rite".
- Pope Francis later reversed these in his motu proprio Traditiones Custodes Episcopi, stating that "the liturgical books promulgated by Saint Paul VI and Saint John Paul II, in conformity with the decrees of Vatican Council II, are the unique expression of the lex orandi of the Roman Rite" and that all provisions contrasting with that were abrogated.

== See also ==
- Council of Trent
- Tridentine Mass
- Pre-Tridentine Mass
- Mass of Paul VI
- Roman Missal
- Mass (liturgy)
