= Code of Rubrics =

Three-part liturgical document promulgated in 1960

The Code of Rubrics is a three-part liturgical document promulgated in 1960 under Pope John XXIII, which in the form of a legal code indicated the liturgical and sacramental law governing the celebration of the Roman Rite Mass and Divine Office.

Pope John approved the Code of Rubrics by the motu proprio Rubricarum instructum of 25 July 1960. The Sacred Congregation of Rites promulgated the Code of Rubrics, a revised calendar, and changes (variationes) in the Roman Breviary and Missal and in the Roman Martyrology by the decree Novum rubricarum the next day.

In the Roman Breviary, the Code of Rubrics replaced the previous rules. In the Roman Missal, it replaced the sections, Rubricae generales Missalis (General Rubrics of the Missal) and Additiones et variationes in rubricis Missalis ad normam Bullae "Divino afflatu" et subsequentium S.R.C. Decretorum (Additions and alterations to the Rubrics of the Missal in line with the Bull Divino afflatu and the decrees of the Sacred Congregation of Rites that followed it). While awaiting that revision, the first of the two sections of the Roman Missal mentioned continued to be printed as before, although the second rendered some of its provisions invalid. This anomalous situation was remedied in the 1962 typical edition of the Roman Missal, which printed in their place the parts of the Code of Rubrics that concerned the Missal. In its turn, the Code of Rubrics was superseded by the General Instruction of the Roman Missal of 1970, but it remains in force for celebrations of the Roman Rite Mass in accordance with the 1962 Missal.

== Contents ==
The Code of Rubrics is in three parts. The first part, "General Rubrics" (Rubricae generales), gives rules concerning liturgical days such as Sundays, vigils, feasts, octaves, and matters such as the colour of the sacred vestments. The second part, "General Rubrics of the Roman Breviary" (Rubricae generales Breviarii Romani), contains rubrics specific to the Roman Breviary. The third part, "General Rubrics of the Roman Missal" (Rubricae generales Missalis Romani), contains rubrics specific to the Roman Missal.

== Some changes ==
A number of rubrical changes were introduced, including a new system of ranking the various liturgical days of the Roman rite (as days of the first, second, third, or fourth class) that superseded the traditional ranking of Sundays and feast days as doubles of varying degrees and simples. Simplifications included elimination of many of the patristic readings at Matins and a reduction in the number of commemorations to be observed in the Office and Mass. Several changes were introduced into the rituals to be observed at Mass, such as eliminating the requirement for the celebrant to read the Epistle and Gospel at the altar during solemn Mass while the texts were chanted by the subdeacon and deacon, respectively.

In association with the Code of Rubrics new typical editions of the Roman Breviary and Missal were issued, incorporating in the text the changes introduced by the Code of Rubrics. The revised Breviary was issued in 1961, within the same year as the Code of Rubrics; the revised Roman Missal, the last whose title, Missale Romanum ex decreto sacrosancti Concilii Tridentini restitutum linked it to the sixteenth-century Council of Trent, in 1962.

== See also ==
- General Instruction of the Roman Missal
