= General Instruction of the Roman Missal =

Document governing the celebration of Mass of the Roman Rite

The General Instruction of the Roman Missal (GIRM)—in the Latin original, Institutio Generalis Missalis Romani (IGMR)—is the detailed document governing the celebration of Mass of the Roman Rite in what since 1969 is its normal form. Originally published in 1969 as a separate document, it is printed at the start of editions of the Roman Missal since 1970.

== Background ==
The 1960 Code of Rubrics replaced the Rubricae Generales Missalis, which had been in the Tridentine Roman Missal since its first edition in 1570 and had been amplified and revised by Pope Clement VIII in 1604. This had been supplemented, since the 1920 edition, by the Additiones et Variationes in Rubricis Missalis ad normam Bullae "Divino afflatu" et subsequentium S.R.C. decretorum (Additions and Variations to the Rubrics of the Missal in accordance with the Bull Divino afflatu and subsequent decrees of the Sacred Congregation of Rites), which indicated the changes in the Roman Missal that followed from the reform of the Roman Breviary by Pope Pius X.

In the 1962 missal, Pope John XXIII had made some changes to the document at the beginning of the Roman Missal called Ritus servandus in celebratione Missarum ('Rite to be observed in celebration of Masses').

== Editions ==
There are three editions of the GIRM:

- The first edition, called in Latin editio typica 1970
- The second edition, called in Latin editio typica altera 1975
- The third edition, called in Latin editio typica tertia 2002. This last edition (2002, emended in 2008) is the one currently in force throughout the world for the celebration of Mass according to the ordinary form of the Roman Rite (commonly known as the "Paul VI Missal"). The first and second editions of the GIRM contain 341 articles, while the third edition contains 399.

== Status ==
In his apostolic exhortation Sacramentum caritatis, Pope Benedict XVI stressed the importance of proper knowledge of the General Instruction not only for priests but also for the laity:

The eucharistic celebration is enhanced when priests and liturgical leaders are committed to making known the current liturgical texts and norms, making available the great riches found in the General Instruction of the Roman Missal and the Order of Readings for Mass. Perhaps we take it for granted that our ecclesial communities already know and appreciate these resources, but this is not always the case. These texts contain riches which have preserved and expressed the faith and experience of the People of God over its two-thousand-year history.

== Regulations for Masses not using the GIRM ==
In the circumstances indicated in the motu proprio Traditionis Custodes of 2021, the Catholic Church permits celebrations of Mass in accordance with the 1962 edition of the Roman Missal. Such celebrations are governed not by the General Instruction but by the 1960 Code of Rubrics, particularly its section Rubricae generales Missalis Romani (General Rubrics of the Roman Missal), and by the Ritus servandus in celebratione Missae (Rite to be observed in celebration of Mass).

== Structure ==
The General Instruction is arranged in nine chapters, preceded by a preamble. The chapter headings are:

1. The Importance and Dignity of the Eucharistic Celebration
2. The Structure of the Mass, Its Elements and Its Parts
3. The Duties and Ministries in the Mass
4. The Different Forms of Celebrating Mass
5. The Arrangement and Furnishing of Churches for the Celebration of the Eucharist
6. The Requisites for the Celebration of Mass
7. The Choice of the Mass and Its Parts
8. Masses and Prayers for Various Circumstances and Masses for the Dead
9. Adaptations within the Competence of Bishops and Bishops' Conferences

== See also ==
- Roman Missal
- Mass of Paul VI
