= Roman Rite =

Most widespread liturgical rite in the Catholic Church

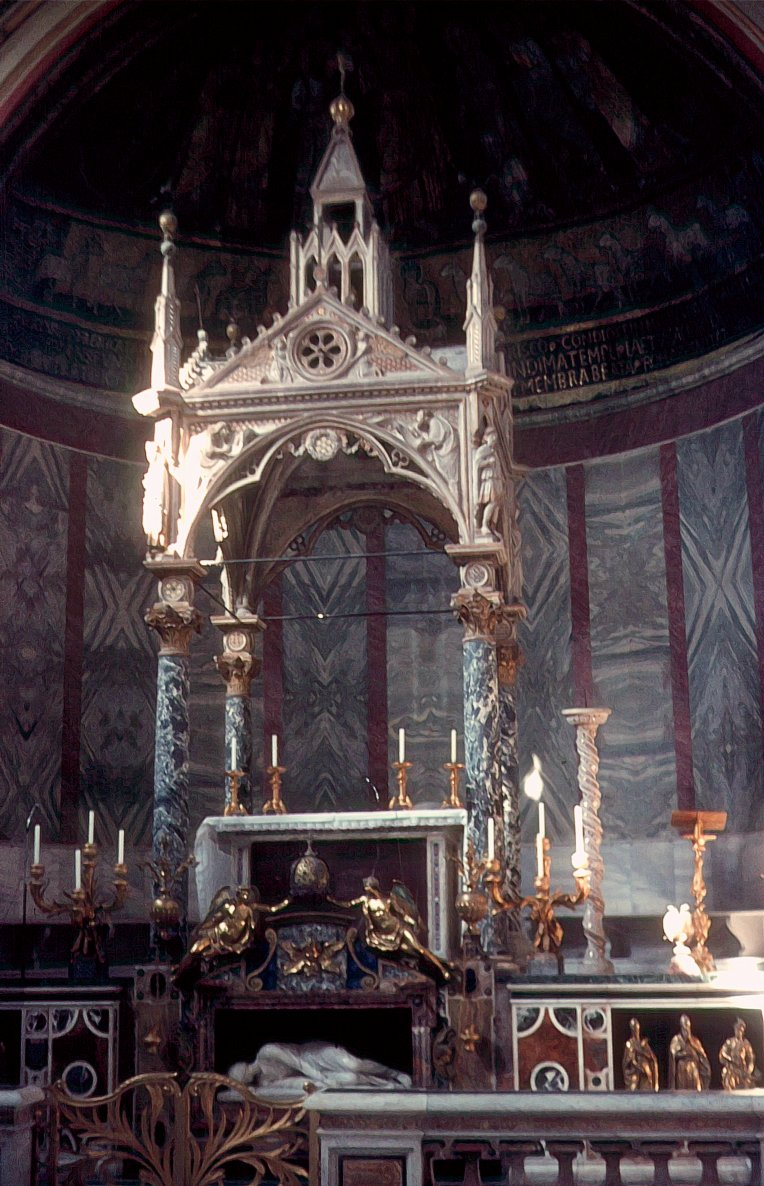
Altar of Santa Cecilia in Trastevere in Rome, as arranged in 1700

The Roman Rite (Latin: Rītus Rōmānus) is the most common ritual family for performing the ecclesiastical services of the Latin Church, the largest of the sui iuris particular churches that comprise the Catholic Church. The Roman Rite governs rites such as the Roman Mass and the Liturgy of the Hours as well as the manner in which sacraments and blessings are performed.

The Roman Rite developed in the Latin language in the city of Rome and, while distinct Latin liturgical rites such as the Ambrosian Rite remain, the Roman Rite has gradually been adopted almost everywhere in the Latin Church. In medieval times there were numerous local variants, even if all of them did not amount to distinct rites, yet uniformity increased as a result of the invention of printing and in obedience to the decrees of the Council of Trent of 1545–1563 (see Quo primum). Several Latin liturgical rites which had survived into the 20th century were abandoned after the Second Vatican Council. The Roman Rite is now the most widespread liturgical rite not only in the Catholic Church but in Christianity as a whole.

The Roman Rite has been adapted through the centuries and the history of its Eucharistic liturgy can be divided into three stages: the Pre-Tridentine Mass, Tridentine Mass, and Mass of Paul VI. It is now normally celebrated in the form promulgated by Pope Paul VI in 1969 and revised by Pope John Paul II in 2002, but use of the Roman Missal of 1962 remains authorized under the conditions indicated in the 2021 papal document Traditionis Custodes.

== Origins and development of the Roman Mass ==
In his 1912 book on the Roman Mass, Adrian Fortescue wrote: "Essentially the Missal of Pius V is the Gregorian Sacramentary; that again is formed from the Gelasian book, which depends on the Leonine collection. We find the prayers of our Canon in the treatise de Sacramentis and allusions to it in the 4th century. So our Mass goes back, without essential change, to the age when it first developed out of the oldest liturgy of all. It is still redolent of that liturgy, of the days when Caesar ruled the world and thought he could stamp out the faith of Christ, when our fathers met together before dawn and sang a hymn to Christ as to a God. The final result of our inquiry is that, in spite of unsolved problems, in spite of later changes, there is not in Christendom another rite so venerable as ours." In a footnote he added: "The prejudice that imagines that everything Eastern must be old is a mistake. Eastern rites have been modified later too; some of them quite late. No Eastern Rite now used is as archaic as the Roman Mass."

In the same book, Fortescue acknowledged that the Roman Rite underwent profound changes in the course of its development. His ideas are summarized in the article on the "Liturgy of the Mass" that he wrote for the Catholic Encyclopedia (published between 1907 and 1914) in which he pointed out that the earliest form of the Roman Mass, as witnessed in Justin Martyr's 2nd-century account, is of Eastern type, while the Leonine and Gelasian Sacramentaries, of about the 6th century, "show us what is practically our present Roman Mass". In the interval, there was what Fortescue called "a radical change". He quoted the theory of A. Baumstark that the Hanc Igitur, Quam oblationem, Supra quæ and Supplices, and the list of saints in the Nobis quoque were added to the Roman Canon of the Mass under "a mixed influence of Antioch and Alexandria", and that "St. Leo I began to make these changes; Gregory I finished the process and finally recast the Canon in the form it still has."

Fortescue concluded:

We have then as the conclusion of this paragraph that at Rome the Eucharistic prayer was fundamentally changed and recast at some uncertain period between the fourth and the sixth and seventh centuries. During the same time the prayers of the faithful before the Offertory disappeared, the kiss of peace was transferred to after the Consecration, and the Epiklesis was omitted or mutilated into our "Supplices" prayer. Of the various theories suggested to account for this it seems reasonable to say with Rauschen: "Although the question is by no means decided, nevertheless there is so much in favour of Drews's theory that for the present it must be considered the right one. We must then admit that between the years 400 and 500 a great transformation was made in the Roman Canon" (Euch. u. Busssakr., 86).

In the same article Fortescue went on to speak of the many alterations that the Roman Rite of Mass underwent from the 7th century on (see Pre-Tridentine Mass), in particular through the infusion of Gallican elements, noticeable chiefly in the variations for the course of the year. This infusion Fortescue called the "last change since Gregory the Great" (who died in 604).

The Eucharistic Prayer normally used in the Byzantine Rite is attributed to Saint John Chrysostom, who died in 407, almost two centuries before Pope Gregory the Great. The East Syrian Eucharistic Prayer of Addai and Mari, which is still in use, is certainly much older.

== Comparison with Eastern rites and other Western rites ==
The Roman Rite is noted for its sobriety of expression. In its Tridentine form, it was noted also for its formality: the Tridentine Missal minutely prescribed every movement, to the extent of laying down that the priest should put his right arm into the right sleeve of the alb before putting his left arm into the left sleeve (Ritus servandus in celebratione Missae, I, 3). Concentration on the exact moment of change of the bread and wine into the Body and Blood of Christ has led, in the Roman Rite, to the consecrated Host and the chalice being shown to the people immediately after the Words of Institution. If, as was once most common, the priest offers Mass while facing ad apsidem (towards the apse), ad orientem (towards the east) if the apse is at the east end of the church, he shows them to the people, who are behind him, by elevating them above his head. As each is shown, a bell (once called "the sacring bell") is rung and, if incense is used, the host and chalice are incensed (General Instruction of the Roman Missal, 100). Sometimes the external bells of the church are rung as well. Other characteristics that distinguish the Roman Rite from the rites of the Eastern Catholic Churches are genuflections and keeping both hands joined together.

The principles underlying the Second Vatican Council's liturgical reforms were applicable to the Roman Rite and to the Eastern rites, although the practical norms set out in the Council's Constitution on the Sacred Liturgy applied only to the Roman Rite.

Jesuit priest Rune P. Thuringer, writing in 1965, noted that "The eucharistic liturgy of the state Church of Sweden, which is Lutheran, is closer in many respects to the rite of the Roman Mass than that of any other Protestant church."

== Liturgy and traditions ==
=== Roman Missal ===
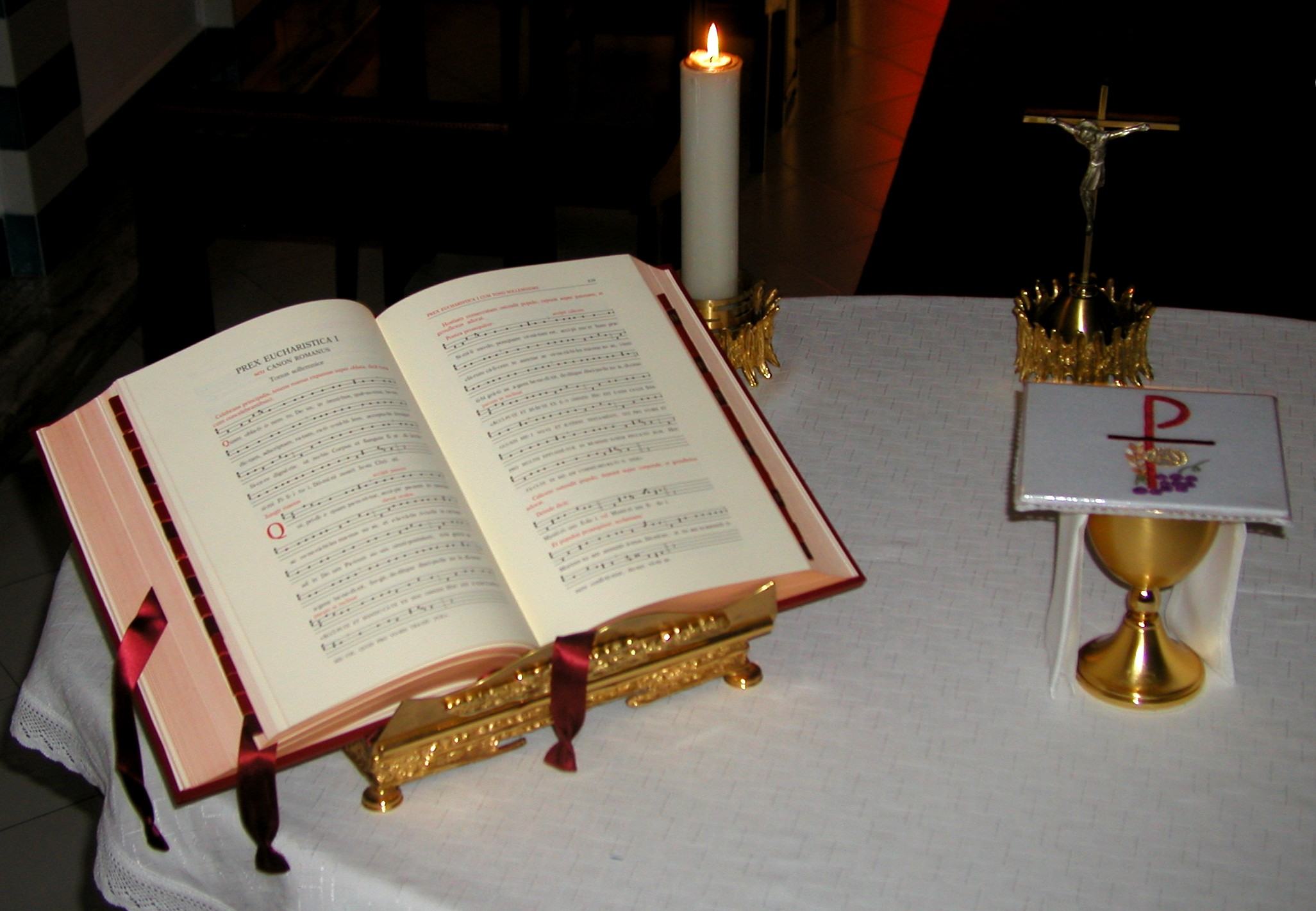
2002 edition of the Missale Romanum

The Roman Missal (Latin: Missale Romanum) is the liturgical book that contains the texts and rubrics for the celebration of the Mass in the Roman Rite of the Catholic Church.

Before the high Middle Ages, several books were used at Mass: a Sacramentary with the prayers, one or more books for the Scriptural readings, and one or more books for the antiphons and other chants. Gradually, manuscripts came into being that incorporated parts of more than one of these books, leading finally to versions that were complete in themselves. Such a book was referred to as a Missale Plenum (English: "Full Missal"). In response to reforms called for in the Council of Trent, Pope Pius V promulgated, in the Apostolic Constitution Quo primum of 14 July 1570, an edition of the Roman Missal that was to be in obligatory use throughout the Catholic Church except where there was a traditional liturgical rite that could be proved to be of at least two centuries' antiquity. The version of the Mass in the 1570s edition became known as the Tridentine Mass. Various relatively minor revision were made in the centuries following, culminating in the 1962 edition promulgated by Pope John XXIII. Pope John XXIII opened the Second Vatican Council that same year, whose participating bishops ultimately called for renewal and reform of the liturgy. The 1969 edition of the Roman Missal was promulgated by Pope Paul VI, issued in response to the council, introduced several major revisions, including simplifying the rituals and permitting translations into local vernacular languages. The version of the Mass in this missal, known colloquially as the Mass of Paul VI, is currently in use throughout the world.

=== Arrangement of churches ===
The Roman Rite of Mass no longer has the pulpitum, or rood screen, a dividing wall characteristic of certain medieval cathedrals in northern Europe, or the iconostasis or curtain that heavily influences the ritual of some other rites. In large churches of the Middle Ages and early Renaissance the area near the main altar, reserved for the clergy, was separated from the nave (the area for the laity) by means of a rood screen extending from the floor to the beam that supported the great cross (the rood) of the church and sometimes topped by a loft or singing gallery. However, by about 1800 the Roman Rite had abandoned rood screens, although some examples survive.

=== Chant ===
Gregorian chant is the traditional chant of the Roman Rite. Being entirely monophonic, it does not have the dense harmonies of present-day chanting in the Russian and Georgian churches. Except in such pieces as the graduals and alleluias, it does not have melismata as lengthy as those of Coptic Christianity. However, the music of the Roman Rite became very elaborate and lengthy when Western Europe adopted polyphony. While the choir sang one part of the Mass the priest said that part quietly to himself and continued with other parts, or he was directed by the rubrics to sit and wait for the conclusion of the choir's singing. Therefore, it became normal in the Tridentine Mass for the priest to say Mass, not sing it, in contrast to the practice in all Eastern rites. Only on special occasions and in the principal Mass in monasteries and cathedrals was the Mass sung.

== Roman Rite of Mass ==
Present-day forms of Roman-Rite Mass

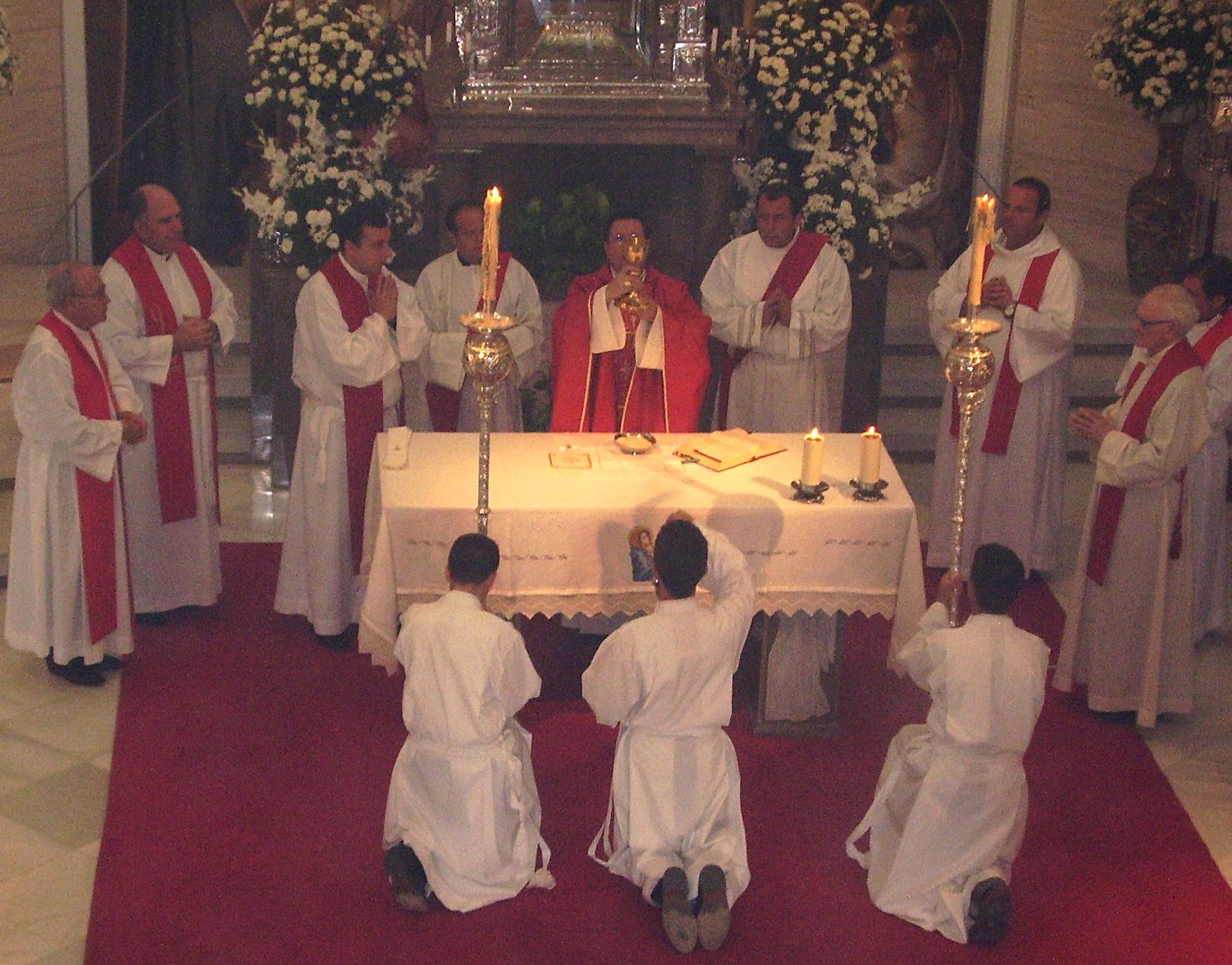
Post-Vatican II Mass As Implemented (Missal of 1970)

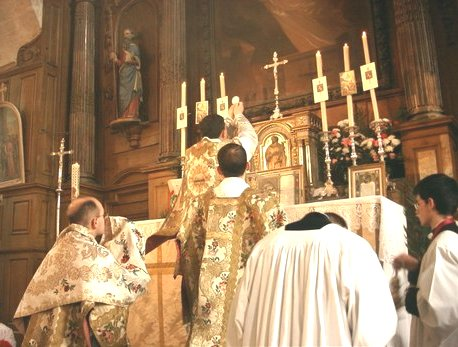
Tridentine (1962 Missal) Solemn Mass

The Catholic Church sees the Mass or Eucharist as "the source and summit of the Christian life", to which the other sacraments are oriented. Remembered in the Mass are Jesus' life, Last Supper, and sacrificial death on the cross at Calvary. The ordained celebrant (priest or bishop) is understood to act in persona Christi, as he recalls the words and gestures of Jesus Christ at the Last Supper and leads the congregation in praise of God. The Mass is composed of two parts, the Liturgy of the Word and the Liturgy of the Eucharist.

Jesuit priest Rune P. Thuringer, writing in 1965, noted that "The eucharistic liturgy of the state Church of Sweden, which is Lutheran, is closer in many respects to the rite of the Roman Mass than that of any other Protestant church." Although similar in outward appearance to the Lutheran Mass or Anglican Mass, the Catholic Church distinguishes between its own Mass and theirs on the basis of what it views as the validity of the orders of their clergy, and as a result, does not ordinarily permit intercommunion between members of these Churches. In a 1993 letter to Bishop Johannes Hanselmann of the Evangelical Lutheran Church in Bavaria, Cardinal Ratzinger (later Pope Benedict XVI) affirmed that "a theology oriented to the concept of succession [of bishops], such as that which holds in the Catholic and in the Orthodox church, need not in any way deny the salvation-granting presence of the Lord [Heilschaffende Gegenwart des Herrn] in a Lutheran [evangelische] Lord's Supper". The Decree on Ecumenism, produced by Vatican II in 1964, records that the Catholic Church notes its understanding that when other faith groups (such as Lutherans, Anglicans, and Presbyterians) "commemorate His death and resurrection in the Lord's Supper, they profess that it signifies life in communion with Christ and look forward to His coming in glory".

Within the fixed structure outlined below, which is specific to the Roman Rite, the Scripture readings, the antiphons sung or recited during the entrance procession or at Communion, and certain other prayers vary each day according to the liturgical calendar.

Traditionalist Catholics use the term salvific "Sacrifice (prosphora, oblatio) of the Mass".

=== Introductory rites ===
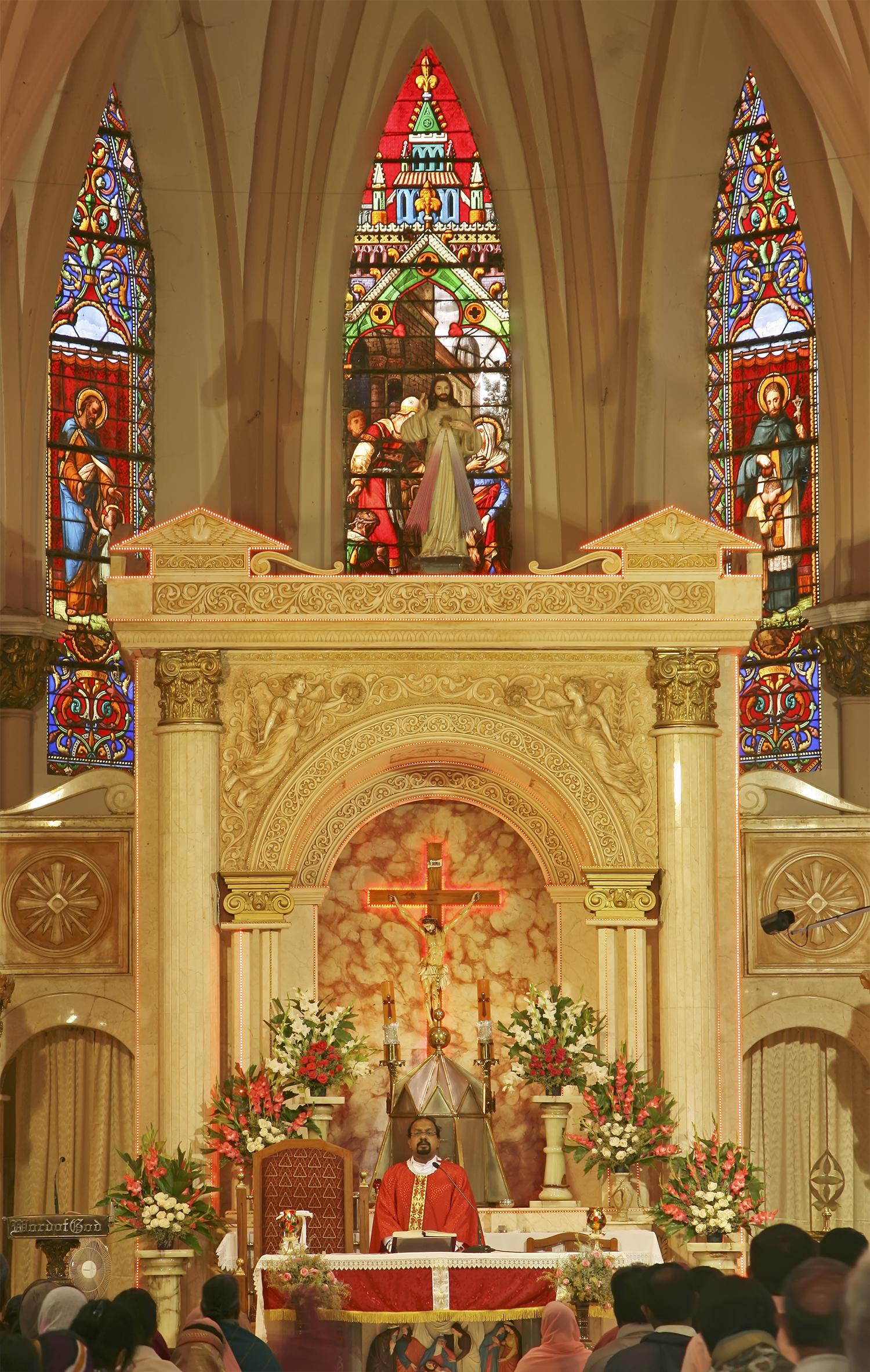
A priest offering the Mass at St. Mary's Basilica, Bangalore

The priest enters, with a deacon if there is one, and altar servers (who may act as crucifer, candle-bearers and thurifer). The priest makes the sign of the cross with the people and formally greets them. Of the options offered for the Introductory Rites, that preferred by liturgists would bridge the praise of the opening hymn with the Glory to God which follows. The Kyrie eleison here has from early times been an acclamation of God's mercy. The Penitential Act instituted by the Council of Trent is also still permitted here, with the caution that it should not turn the congregation in upon itself during these rites which are aimed at uniting those gathered as one praiseful congregation. The Introductory Rites are brought to a close by the Collect Prayer.

=== Liturgy of the Word ===
On Sundays and solemnities, three Scripture readings are given. On other days there are only two. If there are three readings, the first is from the Old Testament (a term wider than "Hebrew Scriptures", since it includes the Deuterocanonical Books), or the Acts of the Apostles during Eastertide. The first reading is followed by a psalm, recited or sung responsorially. The second reading is from the New Testament epistles, typically from one of the Pauline epistles. A Gospel acclamation is then sung as the Book of the Gospels is processed, sometimes with incense and candles, to the ambo; if not sung it may be omitted. The final reading and high point of the Liturgy of the Word is the proclamation of the Gospel by the deacon or priest. On all Sundays and Holy Days of Obligation, and preferably at all Masses, a homily or sermon that draws upon some aspect of the readings or the liturgy itself, is then given. The homily is preferably moral and hortatory. Finally, the Nicene Creed or, especially from Easter to Pentecost, the Apostles' Creed is professed on Sundays and solemnities, and the Universal Prayer or Prayer of the Faithful follows. The designation "of the faithful" comes from when catechumens did not remain for this prayer or for what follows.

=== Liturgy of the Eucharist ===
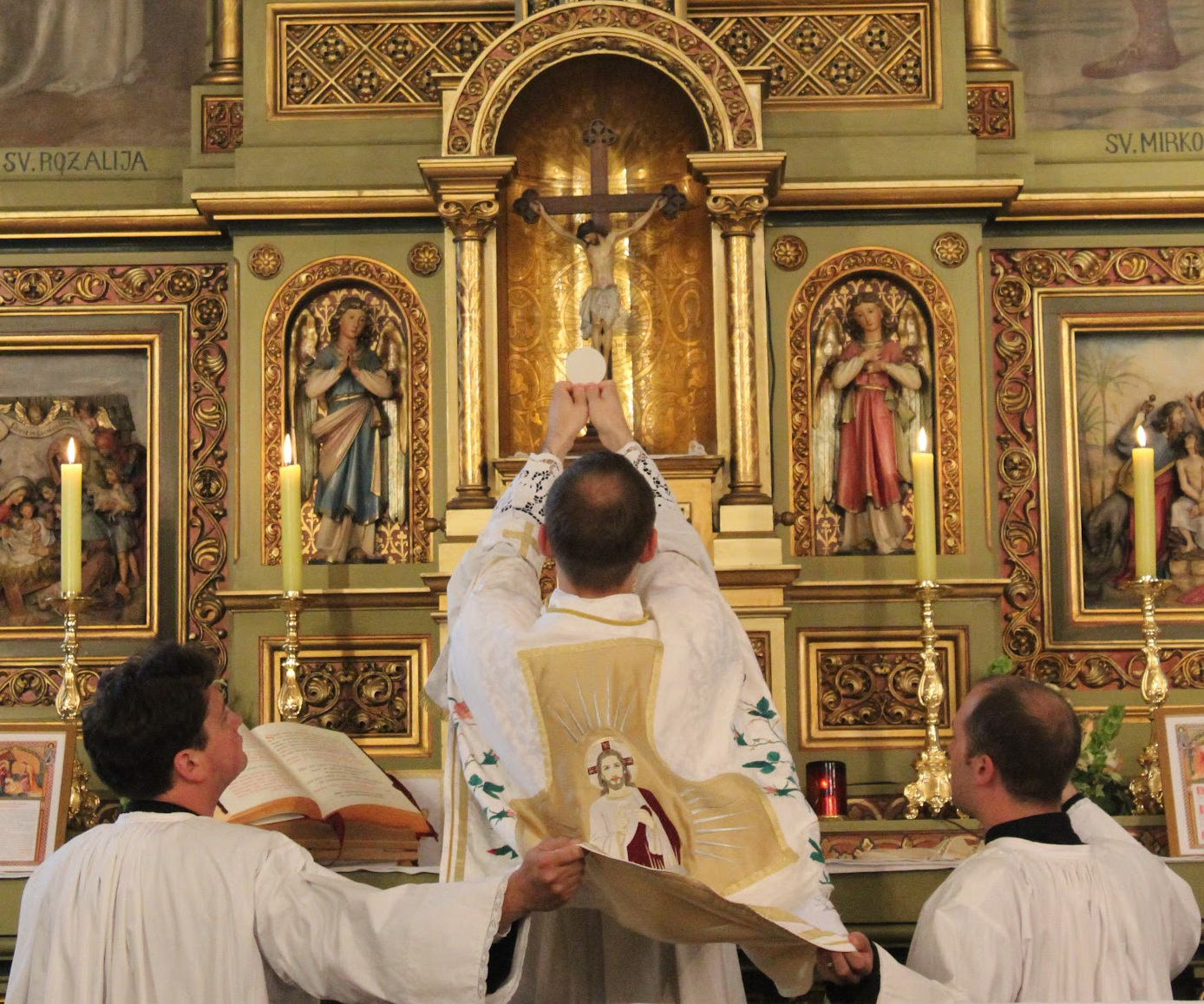
The elevation of the host began in the 14th century to show people the consecrated host.

The Liturgy of the Eucharist begins with the preparation of the altar and gifts, while the collection may be taken. This concludes with the priest saying: "Pray, brethren, that my sacrifice and yours may be acceptable to God, the almighty Father." The congregation stands and responds: "May the Lord accept the sacrifice at your hands, for the praise and glory of His name, for our good, and the good of all His holy Church." The priest then pronounces the variable prayer over the gifts.

Then in dialogue with the faithful the priest brings to mind the meaning of "eucharist", to give thanks to God. A variable prayer of thanksgiving follows, concluding with the acclamation "Holy, Holy ....Heaven and earth are full of your glory. ...Blessed is he who comes in the name of the Lord. Hosanna in the highest."

The anaphora, or more properly "Eucharistic Prayer", follows. The oldest of the anaphoras of the Roman Rite, fixed since the Council of Trent, is called the Roman Canon, with central elements dating to the fourth century. With the liturgical renewal following the Second Vatican Council, numerous other Eucharistic prayers have been composed, including four for children's Masses. Central to the Eucharist is the Institution Narrative, recalling the words and actions of Jesus at his Last Supper, which he told his disciples to do in remembrance of him. Then the congregation acclaims its belief in Christ's conquest over death, and their hope of eternal life. Since the early church an essential part of the Eucharistic prayer has been the epiclesis, the calling down of the Holy Spirit to sanctify the offering and that "the unblemished sacrificial victim to be consumed in Communion may be for the salvation of those who will partake of it." The priest concludes with a doxology in praise of God's work, at which the people give their Amen to the whole Eucharistic prayer.

=== Communion rite ===
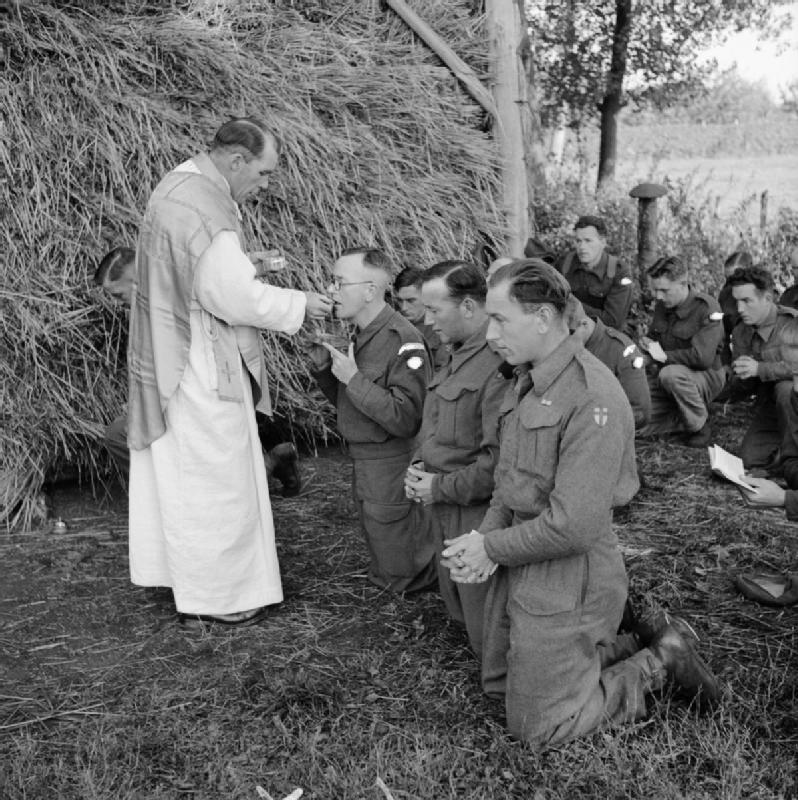
A priest administers Communion during Mass in a Dutch field on the front line in October 1944.

All together recite or sing the "Lord's Prayer" ("Pater Noster" or "Our Father"). The priest introduces it with a short phrase and follows it up with a prayer called the embolism, after which the people respond with another doxology. The sign of peace is exchanged and then the "Lamb of God" ("Agnus Dei" in Latin) litany is sung or recited while the priest breaks the host and places a piece in the main chalice; this is known as the rite of fraction and commingling.

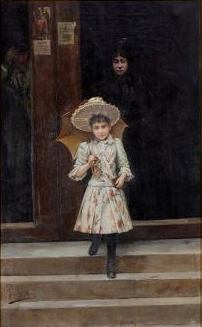
Out of Mass (1893), oil on canvas by Joan Ferrer Miró

The priest then displays the consecrated elements to the congregation, saying: "Behold the Lamb of God, behold him who takes away the sins of the world. Blessed are those called to the supper of the Lamb," to which all respond: "Lord, I am not worthy that you should enter under my roof, but only say the word and my soul shall be healed." Then Communion is given, often with lay ministers assisting with the consecrated wine. According to Catholic teaching, one should be in the state of grace, without mortal sin, to receive Communion. Singing by all the faithful during the Communion procession is encouraged "to express the communicants' union in spirit" from the bread that makes them one. A silent time for reflection follows, and then the variable concluding prayer of the Mass.

=== Concluding rite ===
The priest imparts a blessing over those present. The deacon or, in his absence, the priest himself then dismisses the people, choosing a formula by which the people are "sent forth" to spread the good news. The congregation responds: "Thanks be to God." A recessional hymn is sung by all, as the ministers process to the rear of the church.

== See also ==
- List of Catholic rites and churches
- Liturgical books of the Roman rite
- Ordines Romani
