= Traditionis custodes =

Apostolic letter issued motu proprio by Pope Francis

Traditionis custodes Latin for 'Guardians of the tradition' Apostolic letter of Pope Francis
- Signature date: 16 July 2021
- Subject: On the use of the Roman Rite prior to the liturgical reforms of Pope Paul VI
- Text: In Latin; In English
- AAS: 113 (8): 793-796

Traditionis custodes (Guardians of the Tradition) is an apostolic letter issued motu proprio by Pope Francis, promulgated on 16 July 2021 regarding the continued use of pre-Vatican II rites. It restricts the celebration of the Tridentine Mass of the Roman Rite, sometimes colloquially called the "Latin Mass" or the "Traditional Latin Mass". The apostolic letter was accompanied by an ecclesiastical letter to the Catholic bishops of the world.

The Congregation for Divine Worship has stated in an official instruction (responsa) that the Latin version of Traditionis custodes "is the official text to be referenced".

== Background ==
=== Liturgical reforms after Vatican II ===
In 1969, the first new edition of the Roman Missal based on the revisions of the Second Vatican Council was promulgated, instituting a new form of the Roman Rite's Mass liturgy. Often referred to as the Mass of Paul VI, this edition of the Roman Missal was produced in Latin with consideration that it was to be translated into the vernacular. The first edition of this missal was published in 1970, around one year after its promulgation. It replaced the Roman Missal of the Tridentine Mass, the last edition of which was promulgated in 1962, as well as the various vernacular translations that are often referred to as the "1965 Missal", though themselves not a new form of the Roman Missal.

In 1971, the Liturgy of the Hours – also prepared with expectation of translation into the vernacular – was introduced to replace the 1960 edition of the Roman Breviary as the primary form of prayer for the canonical hours within the Latin Church.

=== John Paul II ===
John Paul II in Quattuor abhinc annos in 1984 liberalised the use of the Tridentine Mass, while still maintaining limitations on its use. This liberalisation was further expanded by the motu proprio Ecclesia Dei in 1988.

=== Summorum Pontificum ===
In 2007, Benedict XVI published the apostolic letter Summorum Pontificum which stated that while the Roman Missal promulgated by Paul VI is "the ordinary expression of the lex orandi [law of prayer] of the Catholic Church of the Latin Rite", the Roman Missal promulgated by Pope Pius V and revised by John XXIII is nevertheless to be considered "an extraordinary expression" of the same lex orandi of the church. The Tridentine Mass was thus called the "Extraordinary Form of the Roman Rite", and the Mass of Paul VI the "Ordinary Form of the Roman Rite".

Benedict decreed that "any Catholic priest of the Latin rite" may use either form and "needs no permission" from his bishop or from the Holy See to do so. He concluded then that "these two expressions of the church's lex orandi will in no way lead to a division in the church's lex credendi [law of faith], for they are two usages of the one Roman rite". Benedict also wrote that faithful could complain to their bishop or even to the Holy See if their requests for celebration of the extraordinary form were denied. This apostolic letter of Benedict XVI, in brief, allowed any priest of the Latin Church to celebrate the Tridentine Mass according to the Roman Missal of 1962 without needing to have his bishop or the Holy See's permission. "Prior to that law, priests and faithful who wished to celebrate the Traditional [Tridentine] Latin Mass had to request explicit permission from their bishop. It could only be offered to those who requested it; it was not allowed to be on the normal Mass schedule for parish churches; and the bishop could set specific days and conditions for its celebration".

=== Before the publication ===
In 2020, the Congregation for the Doctrine of the Faith sent a letter to Catholic bishops of the world to ask them to report on the implementation of Summorum Pontificum in their dioceses. Partial results of this survey were leaked, aswell as the CDF's summarization of them, showing a majority of the world's bishops expressed satisfaction with Summorum Pontificum, with the Congregation for the Doctrine of the Faith's warning any restrictions on it would "cause more harm than good".

In May 2021, less than two months before Traditionis custodes was published, a rumor said that during a "closed-door question-and-answer session" with the members of the Italian bishops' conference, Francis stated that the draft of a text restricting the celebration of the pre-Vatican II Mass was awaiting his approval.

Traditionis custodes was published two days after Francis returned to the Vatican after nine days in hospital.

== Content ==
Traditionis custodes not only repealed the changes liberalising use of the Tridentine Mass in the motu proprio Summorum Pontificum, which had been issued by Francis's predecessor, Benedict XVI, in 2007, but it also went further to limit the practice of the Tridentine Mass.

The apostolic letter is divided into 8 articles.

=== Article 1 ===
In the first article of the apostolic letter, Francis writes that the liturgical books issued by Popes Paul VI and John Paul II after Vatican II are "the unique expression of the lex orandi [law of prayer] of the Roman Rite".

=== Article 2 ===
The second article states that it is a diocesan bishop's "exclusive competence" to authorise the use of the 1962 Roman Missal in his diocese "according to the guidelines of the Apostolic See".

=== Article 3 ===
Another measure is that "[t]he bishop of the diocese in which until now there exist one or more groups that celebrate according to the Missal antecedent to the reform of 1970" has "to determine that these groups do not deny the validity and the legitimacy of the liturgical reform, dictated by Vatican Council II and the Magisterium of the Supreme Pontiffs".

Moreover, the diocesan bishop has "to designate one or more locations", excluding the parochial churches and without erecting new personal parishes, where the faithful adherents of those groups may gather to perform Tridentine Mass. In short, bishops must find alternate locations for groups practising the Tridentine Mass without creating new parishes.

The diocesan bishop must also establish "the days on which eucharistic celebrations are permitted using the Roman Missal promulgated by Saint John XXIII in 1962" and ensure that the readings are "in the vernacular language, using translations of the Sacred Scripture approved for liturgical use by the respective episcopal conferences".

Furthermore, the diocesan bishop must appoint a properly trained priest as his delegate to perform the Tridentine Mass and supervise groups that practice it. The priest must be familiar with the Tridentine Mass and have an understanding of Latin sufficient "for a thorough comprehension of the rubrics and liturgical texts". "This priest should have at heart not only the correct celebration of the liturgy, but also the pastoral and spiritual care of the faithful".

The diocesan bishop also has to "verify that the parishes canonically erected for the benefit of these faithful are effective for their spiritual growth, and to determine whether or not to retain them".

The diocesan bishop must not "authorize the establishment of new groups". The Associated Press paraphrases: "bishops are no longer allowed to authorize the formation of any new pro-Latin Mass groups in their dioceses".

=== Articles 4 and 5 ===
Priests ordained after the publication of the motu proprio who wish to celebrate Mass according to the Tridentine Mass "should submit a formal request to the diocesan bishop who shall consult the Apostolic See before granting this authorization". Priests who already celebrate using the Roman Missal of 1962 "should request from the diocesan Bishop the authorization to continue to enjoy this faculty".

=== Articles 6 and 7 ===
Institutes of consecrated life and societies of apostolic life that were established by the Pontifical Commission Ecclesia Dei—which was created by John Paul II in 1988 and merged into the Congregation for the Doctrine of the Faith in 2019—now fall under the jurisdiction of the Congregation for Institutes of Consecrated Life and Societies of Apostolic Life (CICLSAL).

Both the CICLSAL and the Congregation for Divine Worship "for matters of their particular competence, exercise the authority of the Holy See with respect to the observance of these provisions", which means that requests are to be sent to those two dicasteries, which exercise the authority of the Holy See in overseeing those provisions.

=== Article 8 and effect ===
The last article declares: "previous norms, instructions, permissions, and customs that do not conform to the provisions of the present Motu Proprio are abrogated".

The dispositions in the apostolic letter took effect immediately.

== Accompanying letter ==
Pope Francis also released an ecclesiastical letter to the bishops of the world along with Traditionis custodes explaining his decision, the same way Benedict XVI had done with Summorum Pontificum.

=== Introduction ===
In the letter accompanying the document, Francis explains that the concessions granted by his predecessors John Paul II and Benedict XVI for the use of the 1962 Roman Missal were above all "motivated by the desire to foster the healing of the schism with the movement of Mons. Lefebvre". The request directed to the Catholic bishops to generously welcome the "just aspirations" of the members of the faithful who request the use of this Missal was also motivated by "the ecclesial intention of restoring the unity of the Church", writes Francis. He adds that he believes "many in the Church came to regard this faculty as an opportunity to adopt freely the Roman Missal promulgated by St. Pius V and use it in a manner parallel to the Roman Missal promulgated by St. Paul VI".

Francis recalled that Benedict XVI's decision promulgated with the motu proprio Summorum Pontificum (2007), as well as John Paul II's decisions promulgated by Quattuor abhinc annos and Ecclesia Dei, were sustained by the confidence that "such a provision would not place in doubt one of the key measures of Vatican Council II or minimize in this way its authority". Francis also noted that Pope Benedict had called in 2007 "unfounded" the fear that parishes would be divided by the use of two forms and believed that the two forms would, Benedict said, "enrich one another".

=== Letter of the CDF ===
In 2020, Francis asked the Congregation for the Doctrine of the Faith to send a letter to bishops to ask them about the implementation of Summorum Pontificum. Francis says the bishops' answers "reveal a situation that preoccupies and saddens me". He explains that "an opportunity offered by St. John Paul II and, with even greater magnanimity, by Benedict XVI, intended to recover the unity of an ecclesial body with diverse liturgical sensibilities, was exploited to widen the gaps, reinforce the divergences, and encourage disagreements that injure the Church, block her path, and expose her to the peril of division".

=== Vatican II ===
Francis said that he deplores liturgical abuses "on all sides" and the fact that "in many places the prescriptions of the new Missal are not observed in celebration, but indeed come to be interpreted as an authorization for or even a requirement of creativity, which leads to almost unbearable distortions". However, Francis adds: "I am nonetheless saddened that the instrumental use of the Roman Missal of 1962 is often characterized by a rejection not only of the liturgical reform, but of the Vatican Council II itself, claiming, with unfounded and unsustainable assertions, that it betrayed the Tradition and the 'true Church'". Francis rejects that claim and explains that "the path of the Church must be seen within the dynamic of Tradition 'which originates from the Apostles and progresses in the Church with the assistance of the Holy Spirit' (Dei Verbum, 8)". He recalled that "a recent stage of this dynamic was constituted by Vatican Council II where the Catholic episcopate came together to listen and to discern the path for the Church indicated by the Holy Spirit". He adds: "To doubt the [Vatican II] Council is to doubt the intentions of those very Fathers who exercised their collegial power in a solemn manner cum Petro et sub Petro [with Peter and under Peter] in an ecumenical council, and, in the final analysis, to doubt the Holy Spirit itself who guides the Church".

He said the liturgical reform was carried out "based on the principles" given by the Second Vatican Council and reached "its highest expression in the Roman Missal" published by Pope Paul VI and revised by Pope John Paul II.

Francis also stated: "Whoever wishes to celebrate with devotion according to earlier forms of the liturgy can find in the reformed Roman Missal according to Vatican Council II all the elements of the Roman Rite, in particular the Roman Canon which constitutes one of its more distinctive elements".

=== Unity of the church ===
Francis states his "final reason" for his decision is that "ever more plain in the words and attitudes of many is the close connection between the choice of celebrations according to the liturgical books prior to Vatican Council II and the rejection of the Church and her institutions in the name of what is called the 'true Church'". Francis adds: "One is dealing here with comportment that contradicts communion and nurtures the divisive tendency—'I belong to Paul; I belong instead to Apollo; I belong to Cephas; I belong to Christ'—against which the Apostle Paul so vigorously reacted (Note: Reference to 1 Corinthians 1:12 and 3:4.)". For this reason, he says, "[i]n defense of the unity of the Body of Christ, I am constrained to revoke the faculty granted by my Predecessors. The distorted use that has been made of this faculty is contrary to the intentions that led to granting the freedom to celebrate the Mass with the Missale Romanum of 1962".

According to Francis, John Paul II in 1988 and Benedict XVI in 2007 were motivated to allow "the use of the Roman Missal of 1962" for the celebration of the Mass "to promote the concord and unity of the church" and "to facilitate the ecclesial communion of those Catholics who feel attached to some earlier liturgical forms". He says that his predecessors "were confident that such a provision would not place in doubt one of the key measures of Vatican Council II, or minimize in this way its authority", but that things did not develop the way his predecessors intended; Francis states that therefore he had to act because the unity of the church was now threatened.

=== Comparison with the Tridentine Mass ===
In this letter, Francis writes: "I take the firm decision to abrogate all the norms, instructions, permissions and customs that precede the present motu proprio, and declare that the liturgical books promulgated by the saintly Pontiffs Paul VI and John Paul II, in conformity with the decrees of Vatican Council II, constitute the unique expression of the lex orandi [law of prayer] of the Roman Rite. I take comfort in this decision from the fact that, after the Council of Trent, St. Pius V also abrogated all the rites that could not claim a proven antiquity, establishing for the whole Latin Church a single Roman Missal".

Francis added that during four centuries, this Roman Missal was "the principal expression of the lex orandi of the Roman Rite, and functioned to maintain the unity of the Church" until "without denying the dignity and grandeur of this Rite" the bishops "gathered in ecumenical council asked that it be reformed". Francis says that their intention was that "the faithful would not assist as strangers and silent spectators in the mystery of faith, but, with a full understanding of the rites and prayers, would participate in the sacred action consciously, piously, and actively". He adds: "St. Paul VI, recalling that the work of adaptation of the Roman Missal had already been initiated by Pius XII, declared that the revision of the Roman Missal, carried out in the light of ancient liturgical sources, had the goal of permitting the church to raise up, in the variety of languages, 'a single and identical prayer' that expressed her unity. This unity I intend to re-establish throughout the church of the Roman Rite".

=== Appeal ===
Pope Francis appeals to the bishops in his letter, saying: "While in the exercise of my ministry in the service of unity, I take the decision to suspend the faculty granted by my predecessors, I ask you to share with me this burden as a form of participation in the solicitude for the whole Church proper to the bishops".

=== Instructions to the bishops ===
Francis gave explicit instructions to the bishops to take measures to strongly limit the use of the Tridentine Rite, with the clear goal of getting all Catholics to eventually celebrate only the reformed liturgy which followed Vatican II. Francis wrote: "Indications about how to proceed in your dioceses are chiefly dictated by two principles: on the one hand, to provide for the good of those who are rooted in the previous form of celebration and need to return in due time to the Roman Rite promulgated by Saints Paul VI and John Paul II, and, on the other hand, to discontinue the erection of new personal parishes tied more to the desire and wishes of individual priests than to the real need of the 'holy People of God'".

Francis adds that he asks the bishops "to be vigilant in ensuring that every liturgy be celebrated with decorum and fidelity to the liturgical books promulgated after Vatican Council II, without the eccentricities that can easily degenerate into abuses. Seminarians and new priests should be formed in the faithful observance of the prescriptions of the Missal and liturgical books, in which is reflected the liturgical reform willed by Vatican Council II".

== Congregation for Divine Worship official guidelines ==
=== Responsa ===
On 18 December 2021, the Congregation for Divine Worship and the Discipline of the Sacraments (CDW), (Note: Since Praedicate evangelium's entry into force on 5 June 2022, it is called the Dicastery for Divine Worship and the Discipline of the Sacraments (DDW).) the Holy See office responsible for matters related to liturgy, released official guidelines and clarifications, approved by Pope Francis, on the implementation of Traditionis custodes. Those guidelines are dated 4 December 2021. The guidelines are structured as individual responsa to 11 questions, with explanatory notes included.

Accompanying those guidelines is a letter of the prefect of the CDW, Archbishop Arthur Roche, to the presidents of all Catholic episcopal conferences, in which Roche says that the primary aim of the new guidelines is to foster ecclesial communion.

The instruction states that "if it is established that it is impossible to use another church, oratory or chapel", then a group celebrating the 1962 Tridentine Mass can be allowed to celebrate its Tridentine Mass in a parish church with permission from both the diocesan bishop and the CDW. In this case, the instruction states, "such a celebration should not be included in the parish Mass schedule, since it is attended only by the faithful who are members of the said group" and "it should not be held at the same time as the pastoral activities of the parish community". It is precised that "when another venue becomes available", the permission to celebrate the Tridentine Mass in a parish church "will be withdrawn".

The guidelines state that only personal parishes erected under the norms of Traditionis custodes can be allowed to perform rites according to the 1952 edition of the book Rituale Romanum; those rites are baptism, penance, marriage, anointing of the sick, and funeral rites. The instruction adds that the use of the sacraments of confirmation and ordination as found in the book Pontificale Romanum are totally forbidden. Both the Pontificale Romanum and the Rituale Romanum predate the liturgical reforms.

The instruction further states that a priest who has been allowed to perform the 1962 Tridentine Mass and who does not recognise the validity of concelebrating, (Note: The Tridentine Latin Mass does not normally permit concelebrating outside of the cases of the ordination of priests and bishops.) and who therefore refuses to concelebrate and in particular refuses to concelebrate the Chrism Mass with his bishop on Holy Thursday, cannot be allowed to celebrate the 1962 Tridentine Mass. The instruction also states that during Tridentine Masses, "readings are to be proclaimed in the vernacular language", and that vernacular translations from Bibles approved by their local episcopal conference must be used to translate passages found in the Readings sections of the 1962 missal; furthermore, "[n]o vernacular lectionaries may be published that reproduce the cycle of readings" of the 1962 Tridentine Mass.

The concession of celebrating the 1962 Tridentine Mass that any diocesan bishop would want to grant to any priest ordained after the publication of Traditionis custodes (16 July 2021) must before that necessarily be approved by the Holy See. Diocesan bishops may grant the concession during a limited, defined period of time. Any concession of allowing the celebration of the 1962 Tridentine Mass is restricted to the territory of the bishop who granted it. In case of absence of the authorised priest, the substituting priest must also receive a formal authorisation to perform the 1962 Tridentine Mass. Authorisation is also required for deacons and the instituted ministers who participate in the celebration of the Tridentine Mass. As for bination (the celebration of two masses on the same day by the same priest): priests or chaplains who celebrate the mass using the mass of Paul VI on one weekday cannot celebrate the same day the 1962 Tridentine Mass, and priests can only celebrate the Tridentine Mass once a day.

Answering questions of the National Catholic Register concerning the instruction, Abp. Roche said: "The responses to the various dubia are evidently legitimate and fully compliant with Canon Law in their elaboration by this Congregation whose authority in this matter is undisputed. [...] What is important to realize now is that the Holy Father has spoken; the liturgical possibilities are in place; the challenge is to get on with it without licking one's wounds when no one has been injured". He added concerning a question on the difference with the Tridentine Mass with other rites: "There is only one Roman Rite, just as there is only one Ambrosian Rite and one Mozarabic Rite. The Gallican Rite disappeared many centuries ago [...]. The others are not rites but usages — adaptations or inculturation of the Roman Rite, which has received approval by the Apostolic See for specific reasons". He stated concerning the former Ecclesia Dei communities: "The Congregation for Consecrated Life and Societies of Apostolic Life has competency over [those communities]. This Congregation has not made any statement about these Institutes. However, the principle has been established that ordinations in the Latin Church are conferred as directed by the Rite approved by Apostolic Constitution in 1968".

=== Rescript ===
On 21 February 2023, the Holy See published a papal rescript written by Arthur Roche, Prefect of Dicastery for Divine Worship and the Discipline of the Sacraments (DDW); the rescript had been approved by the pope the day before. The rescript clarifies that canon 87 of the 1983 Code of Canon Law cannot be used by diocesan bishops to allow the faithful to continue celebrating Tridentine Mass and pre-Vatican II reforms sacraments, since the restrictions contained in Traditionis custodes are "reserved in a special way to the Apostolic See". It also states that bishops which had dispensed those restrictions by relying on this canon, must "inform the Dicastery for Divine Worship and the Discipline of the Sacraments, which will evaluate the individual cases". The rescript also states: "the Holy Father confirms - having already expressed his assent in the audience of 18 November 2021 - what was established in the Responsa ad dubia with the annexed Explanatory Notes of 4 December 2021".

Canon 87 allows a bishop to dispense the faithful from certain disciplinary laws within his jurisdiction "whenever he judges that it contributes to their spiritual good", unless the law's application is specially reserved to the judgement of the Holy See. This canon had been previously used by some bishops to allow Catholics to continue celebrating Tridentine Mass and pre-Vatican II reforms sacraments.

Previously, in early February, canon lawyer J.D. Flynn had criticized Roche: Flynn wrote in The Pillar that – contrary to what Roche had written in official DDW letters – the DDW had no canonical right to deny diocesan bishops the right to dispense of Traditionis custodes restrictions, due to canon 87. Roche had responded to Flynn, saying: "It is an absurdity to think that the prefect of a dicastery would do anything other than exercise the wishes of the Holy Father as clearly outlined in their mandate and the General Norms of Praedicate Evangelium. The article in The Pillar is not really an attack on me but on the Pope's authority which for Catholics is an astonishing act full of hubris".

== Reception ==
=== Catholic Church ===
==== Clergy ====
American Cardinal Raymond Burke, who served as Prefect of the Supreme Tribunal of the Apostolic Signatura until 2014, told National Catholic Register that "he sees as a number of flaws in Traditionis Custodes, saying he could not understand how the new Roman Missal is the 'unique expression of the lex orandi of the Roman Rite,' as the new motu proprio states. The Extraordinary Form of the Mass 'is a living form of the Roman Rite and has never ceased to be so,' Cardinal Burke noted. He also could not understand why the motu proprio takes effect immediately, as the decree 'contains many elements that require study regarding its application'." He added that "in his long experience he has not witnessed the 'gravely negative situation' Francis describes in his letter". He later published a statement regarding Traditionis custodes on his personal website. In this statement, he called the restrictions imposed by Francis "severe and revolutionary", and questioned the pope's authority to revoke the practice of the Tridentine Mass.

Cardinal Gerhard Ludwig Müller, who served as Prefect for the Congregation for the Doctrine of the Faith until 2017, criticised the letter as "harsh", saying: "Instead of appreciating the smell of the sheep, the shepherd here hits them hard with his crook." He also contrasted the approach taken by Francis to curb the traditionalist movement with his failure to condemn "the innumerable 'progressive' abuses in the liturgy ... that are tantamount to blasphemy".

Retired Cardinal Joseph Zen SDB released a statement on his personal blog, in which he wrote: "Many tendentious generalizations in the documents [of the motu proprio] have hurt the hearts of many good people more than expected". He added that he believed that many people who had been hurt by the restrictions "have never given the smallest reason to be suspected of not accepting the liturgical reform of the [Second Vatican Council]".

Cardinal Walter Kasper, when asked to comment on Traditionis custodes, said he believes the "overwhelming majority" of Catholics are strongly against the Tridentine Mass, and that some of the Tridentine Mass adherents scandalise said majority by believing the Tridentine Mass is the only true Catholic Mass and by rejecting Vatican II "more or less in its entirety". He added that some faithful who attend the Tridentine Mass have turned Benedict XVI's efforts at reconciliation into division, and thus struck at the "very heart of the unity of the Church".

The president of the USCCB, José Horacio Gómez, states: "I welcome the Holy Father’s desire to foster unity among Catholics who celebrate the Roman Rite. As these new norms are implemented, I encourage my brother bishops to work with care, patience, justice, and charity as together we foster a Eucharistic renewal in our nation".

The Bishops' Conference of France states that the bishops of France "wish to express to the faithful who habitually celebrate according to the Missal of St. John XXIII, and to their pastors, their care, the esteem they have for the spiritual zeal of these faithful, and their determination to continue the mission together, in the communion of the Church and according to the norms in force". It adds that "The motu proprio Traditionis custodes and the letter of the Holy Father to the bishops that introduces it are a demanding call for the whole Church to an authentic Eucharistic renewal. None can dispense with it".

American Jesuit priest and consultant to the Secretariat for Communications at the Vatican James Martin SJ, wrote in America: "Overall, I agree with Francis's motu proprio, not simply based on my own experience of the growing divisiveness over the Mass, but even more on his consultation with bishops around the world who have weighed in on the experiences of the People of God".

Monsignor Eric Barr, a retired priest of the Diocese of Rockford defended the Pope's decision in an article on the Catholic Herald: he argued that the traditionalist Catholic movement had become divisive among the Church, rejecting many of its arguments and stressing the need for liturgical unity in the Church.

It has been reported that Traditionis custodes demonstrated the growing influence of the liturgical faculty of the Sant'Anselmo University at the Vatican, as the newly appointed secretary and undersecretary of the CDW, Vittorio Francesco Viola OFM and Aurelio García Macías, both studied at the institute. Andrea Grillo, an Italian professor of sacramental theology at the institute sometimes described as "the mind behind the motu proprio" Traditionis custodes, stated that Traditionis custodes restored "the 'elementary' and 'healthy' logic of the universal validity of a single Roman rite, without any possibility, unless exceptional or personal, of the parallel validity of an ‘earlier’ form of the Roman rite".

In a 4 August 2021 reply letter to cardinal Vincent Nichols concerning the application of Traditionis custodes, Archbishop Arthur Roche, prefect of the CDW, stated in his reply "of a personal nature" that the Tridentine Mass had been "abrogated by Pope Saint Paul VI". The CDW at this moment had not released a guideline on the application of Traditionis custodes. It was noted that Roche's declaration contradicted that of Benedict XVI in his 2007 letter to the world's bishops accompanying Summorum Pontificum, in which the Pope wrote that the Tridentine Mass was "never juridically abrogated". In an interview with Catholic News Service in January 2022, archbishop Arthur Roche stated that the steps that were being taken on restricting the use of the 1962 missal was something that was mandated by the Second Vatican Council. Roche said that if the faithful did not take Traditionis custodes seriously, then those faithful would be making "a serious decision". In the same interview, Roche clarified that the motu propio was issued not only due to concerns about ecclesial unity, but also due to the fact that after Benedict XVI had lifted restrictions on the old rite, the old rite was being promoted rather than just being seen as a concession to those who were attached to said rite. In April 2023, Arthur Roche states the restriction on the Tridentine mass was necessary, because "the theology of the Church has changed". He explains that before the liturgical reforms only the priest was celebrating the liturgy, but that now in the Mass of Paul VI all those present during the Eucharist participate in the liturgy.

==== Pope Benedict XVI ====
Upon the death of Pope Emeritus Benedict XVI, the Priestly Fraternity of Saint Peter stated that the publication of Traditionis custodes had prompted Pope Benedict to send a letter of encouragement to the Fraternity. In a 1 January 2023 interview to Die Tagespost, Benedict's former secretary Georg Gänswein stated that Benedict had read Traditionis custodes "with pain in his heart". In his book Nothing but the Truth, released 12 January 2023, Gänswein wrote that Benedict considered the restriction of the Tridentine mass to be "a mistake" since it "jeopardized the attempt at pacification" between the Tridentine Mass and the Mass of Paul VI; Gänswein also related that "Benedict in particular felt it was wrong to prohibit the celebration of Mass in the ancient rite in parochial churches".

==== Traditionalist Catholics ====
Traditionalist Catholics "immediately decried [Traditionis custodes] as an attack on them and the ancient liturgy". The Tablet, a British Catholic publication, reported that many traditionalist Catholics were angered by Traditionis custodes, further stating that traditionalists expressed concern that certain bishops would use the motu proprio to prohibit the Tridentine Mass within their dioceses.

Joseph Shaw, the chairman of the Latin Mass Society of England and Wales, said that the motu proprio appeared to "undo entirely the legal provisions made for the Traditional Mass by Pope Benedict, and to take us back not only to the situation before the 2007 apostolic letter Summorum Pontificum, but even before 1988, when Pope John Paul II – who was canonized by Pope Francis – described the more ancient Mass as a 'rightful aspiration' of the faithful". He also stated that Traditionis custodes was a "staggering document, exceeding our worst expectations. Pope Francis has completely undone the arrangements of Summorum Pontificum and created a situation which seems entirely unworkable, banning the Extraordinary Form from parish churches". He also published a blog post on the subject on the Society's website. The Latin Mass Society later stated in a document that the responsa from the CDW had no binding force, as they were not directly issued by the pope. Arthur Roche, head of the CDW, responded to the Latin Mass Society document by saying: "The responses to the various dubia are evidently legitimate and fully compliant with Canon Law in their elaboration by this Congregation whose authority in this matter is undisputed".

The Fœderatio Internationalis Una Voce released an official statement in which it rejected the idea that those who performed or assisted at Tridentine Masses were disobedient to the Catholic Church and the Second Vatican Council.

The Priestly Fraternity of Saint Peter (FSSP) in a communiqué said it "ha[d] received Pope Francis' Motu Proprio Traditionis custodes with surprise". It adds that since the Fraternity is approved canonically, and had always been faithful to the "entire Magisterium of the Church" and to the pope, "[t]oday, therefore the Fraternity of St. Peter is deeply saddened by the reasons given for limiting the use of the Missal of Pope St. John XXIII, which is at the center of its charism". On 21 February 2022, the Priestly Fraternity of Saint Peter announced that on 4 February, they had a meeting with Pope Francis who informed them that the institutes whose reason for existence is the use of the Tridentine Mass, and its associated Liturgical books, were unaffected by the motu proprio. The FSSP also stated the Pope issued a decree granting the members of the Fraternity to the ability to celebrate the Mass other the sacraments and rites according to the typical editions of the liturgical books in force in 1962.

On the other hand, Bishop Fernando Arêas Rifan, Apostolic Administrator of the Personal Apostolic Administration of Saint John Mary Vianney, which celebrates the Tridentine Mass, accepted the motu proprio, understanding the abuses that were being committed in using the Tridentine Mass as a way to attack the Pope and the Second Vatican Council. However, he defended that these abuses were committed by only a minority, and said that the majority of traditional Catholics were faithful to the Pope and the Church's Magisterium.

==== Public opinion ====
A September 2021 survey conducted by the Pew Research Center found that roughly two-thirds of U.S. Catholics were unaware of the new restrictions. Among weekly mass attending U.S. Catholics, 29% disapproved of the new restrictions, 11% approved, 17% had no opinion, and 42% were unaware of them.

=== Society of Saint Pius X ===
Davide Pagliarani FSSPX, Superior General of the Society of Saint Pius X, published a letter concerning Traditionis custodes. In it, he said: "We can point out, quite logically, that the era of the hermeneutics of continuity, with its equivocations, illusions and impossible efforts, is radically over – swept aside with a wave of a sleeve. These clear-cut measures do not directly affect the Society of Saint Pius X. However, they must be an occasion for us to reflect deeply on the situation". He added that "the Tridentine Mass expresses and conveys a conception of Christian life – and consequently, a conception of the Catholic Church – that is absolutely incompatible with the ecclesiology that emerged from the Second Vatican Council". He also stated: "May this 'shock', provoked by the harshness of the official texts of July 16th, serve to renew, deepen and rediscover our attachment to the Tridentine Mass!".

=== Academics ===
Kurt Martens, professor of canon law at the Catholic University of America, noted that the term "extraordinary form" is no longer used in the new legislation and that the new motu proprio "establishes that liturgical books promulgated in conformity with the decrees of Vatican Council II are the unique expression of the lex orandi of the Roman Rite". He adds: "Diocesan bishops are given broad responsibility with regard to the use of the former liturgy".

Christopher Bellitto, professor of church history at Kean University, said Francis was right to intervene, noting that Benedict XVI's original decision had had numerous unintended consequences that not only split the church but temporarily roiled relations with Jews. "Francis hits it right on the head with his observation that Benedict’s 2007 loosening of regulations against the Latin rite allowed others to use it for division. The blowback (Note: According to the Associated Press, Traditionis custodes suffered a fierce blowback.) proves his point".

Martin Klöckener, professor of liturgy at the University of Fribourg, welcomed the motu proprio as a necessary correction to Benedict's approach. He noted that it restored some measure of the authority that Benedict had denied to local bishops. He also welcomed Francis's approach that makes the 1962 edition of the Roman Missal the only form of pre-concilar Mass of the Roman Rite now permitted. He believes that Francis acted because in the 2020 survey "many bishops spoke a clearer language than was otherwise heard in public".

Douglas Farrow, professor of theology and ethics at McGill University, wrote: "In sum: Traditionis Custodes, alas, confirms that the old Mass has indeed become a proxy in the fight over the legacy of Vatican II, as much on the one side as on the other. It also confirms that in Rome rigidity is the order of the day".

=== Journalists ===
Pope Francis' decision was interpreted by the priest Raymond J. de Souza, editor of the Convivium magazine, as more a "sociological" decision relating to unity in the Catholic Church than a judgement of the Tridentine Missal's spiritual qualities.

Michael Sean Winters writes:

Aficionados of the old rite like to talk about how that rite uniquely conveys the sense that each Mass is a part of the one eternal sacrifice of Christ [...]. If the Eucharist is, as Vatican II taught, the source and summit of the Catholic faith, then we know that when the celebration of the Eucharist fails to serve the unity of the church, something is wrong, and it isn't ever the fault of him whose sacrifice we commemorate.

The New York Times columnist Ross Douthat was critical of the work, contrasting the action with Pope Francis' stress on the need to accompany people, stating: "Accompaniment for some, slow strangulation of their rites for others".

On 1 July 2025, the Catholic journalist Diane Montagna released documents she said were leaked from the CDF. The documents suggested that a majority of bishops who responded to the CDF's survey in 2020 were not in favour of restricting the Tridentine Mass and indicated such an action would increase tensions. Other bishops expressed opposition or neutrality towards Benedict having permitted the Tridentine Mass. The authenticity of the leaks were not confirmed by the CDF and increased debate over Traditionis custodes.

== Implementation ==
=== Central America ===
On 20 July 2021, the Episcopal Conference of Costa Rica stated that no Tridentine Mass would be allowed in any of their dioceses.

=== United States ===
According to The Pillar's review of the Latin Mass Directory, there were 657 canonically regular venues that offered a Tridentine Mass in the United States prior to Traditionis custodes, including 49 operated exclusively by the Priestly Fraternity of St. Peter (FSSP).

Several American bishops (including Scharfenberger, Aquila, and Cordileone) stressed that even under the new guidelines the Tridentine Mass would continue to be offered in their dioceses.

On 23 July 2021, Catholic News Agency reported on a survey of dioceses. The results were that although the majority of dioceses had not commented on the disposition of Traditionis custodes, most of the United States bishops who had to date issued statements on said dispositions had decided that priests who were already celebrating the Traditional Latin Mass may continue to do so. In December 2021, Cardinal Blase Cupich implemented restrictions within the Archdiocese of Chicago, which banned celebration of Tridentine Masses on the first Sundays of each month as well as on Christmas, Easter Triduum and Pentecost Sunday. Similar restrictions, were applied by Cardinal Wilton Gregory, in the Archdiocese of Washington, in September 2022.

=== United Kingdom ===
In England, the first personal parish for celebration of the Tridentine Mass had been established in 2018, three years before Traditionis custodes would prohibit further creation of such parishes. The Catholic Bishops' Conference of England and Wales did not issue a general statement regarding the celebration of the Tridentine Mass under the new regulations. Certain regularly scheduled Tridentine Masses were permanently cancelled at the behest of local bishops within the first week, while other ordinaries stated they would grant temporary permissions until they had reviewed the motu proprio. These restrictions to the celebration of the Tridentine Mass caused membership of the Latin Mass Society of England and Wales to increase.

The Diocese of Clifton immediately banned the celebrations of the Tridentine Mass, following the publication of the motu proprio.

Following the Responsa ad dubia in December 2021, Cardinal Vincent Nichols, prohibited the celebration of the Sacrament of Confirmation in the Archdiocese of Westminster according to the pre-Vatican II rites, using the older Roman Pontifical. This affected the annual traditional Catholic confirmations at St James's, Spanish Place in London (part of the archdiocese of Westminster), where, before 2022, they had been celebrated under indult for the last 20 years.

In February 2024, Cardinal Nichols announced that the Tridentine Mass planned for the Paschal Triduum, that had annually been held at St. Mary Moorfields, would be cancelled, resulting in the first time since the 1990s that the Triduum, would not be celebrated in the archdiocese, according to the old rites.

== Desiderio desideravi ==
On 29 June 2022, the motu proprio apostolic letter Desiderio desideravi of Pope Francis was released. In it, the pope states he had published Traditionis custodes because some people accepted Vatican II but rejected the liturgical reforms that followed it which had been promulgated by Paul VI and John Paul II. He adds that since Sacrosanctum Concilium "expresses the reality of the liturgy", he had stressed in Traditionis custodes that the reformed Vatican II liturgy is "the unique expression of the lex orandi of the Roman Rite". He states that "we cannot go back to that ritual form which the [Vatican II] Council fathers ... felt the need to reform". He wrote Traditionis custodes, he continues, because the liturgical books of Paul VI and John Paul II "guaranteed the fidelity of the reform of the [Vatican II] Council", and because Francis wanted that "the Church may lift up, in the variety of so many languages, one and the same prayer capable of expressing her unity". He states he was determined to make it so that "unity be re-established in the whole Church of the Roman Rite".

== See also ==
- Preconciliar rites after the Second Vatican Council
- Mediator Dei
- Liturgical reforms of Pope Pius XII
- Sacrosanctum Concilium, the Constitution on the Sacred Liturgy (1963)
- List of communities using the Tridentine Mass
