= Lex orandi, lex credendi =

Principle of the relationship between belief and prayer in Christian tradition

Lex orandi, lex credendi (Latin: "the law of what is prayed [is] the law of what is believed"), sometimes expanded as Lex orandi, lex credendi, lex vivendi (Latin: "the law of what is prayed [is] what is believed [is] the law of what is lived"), is a motto in Christian tradition, which means that prayer and belief are integral to each other and that liturgy is not distinct from theology. It refers to the relationship between worship and belief, for example that people's prayers shape their faith. Its rude applicability as a self-standing principle independent of hope and charity was denied by Pope Pius XII, who positioned liturgy as providing theological evidence not sole authority, although having undeniable divine elements.

== Origin ==
The original maxim is found in 5th Century writer Prosper of Aquitaine's eighth chapter of On the Authority of the Past Bishops of the Apostolic See Concerning the Grace of God and Free Will: "ut legem credendi lex statuat supplicandi."

Let us consider the sacraments of priestly prayers, which having been handed down by the apostles are celebrated uniformly throughout the whole world and in every Catholic Church so that the law of praying might establish the law of believing" (emph. added)

— Prosper of Aquitaine

This section is quoted and ratified by Pope Celestine I in epistle 21, Letter to the Gallican Bishops.

"Supplicandi" and “Credendi" are gerunds which are oblique cases of the infinitive, and so can be translated into English as "of praying/believing," or just "of prayer/belief," respectively.

== Catholicism ==
The principle is considered very important in Catholic theology. The Catholic theologian Father Gregory Hesse states:

"The oldest liturgical rule is 'lex orandi, lex credendi', i.e. 'the law of what has to be prayed constitutes the law of what has to be believed (...) Liturgy is a sign of a specific grace received ex operæ operatio"

— A Summary of Father Hesse talks on the documents of Vatican II

=== Proof not source ===
In the encyclical Mediator Dei, Pope Pius XII elucidates the limits of this principle and addresses errors that can arise from a misunderstanding of it. He states:

46. [...]We refer to the error and fallacious reasoning of those who have claimed that the sacred liturgy is a kind of proving ground for the truths to be held of faith, meaning by this that the Church is obliged to declare such a doctrine sound when it is found to have produced fruits of piety and sanctity through the sacred rites of the liturgy, and to reject it otherwise. Hence the epigram, "Lex orandi, lex credendi" - the law for prayer is the law for faith.

47. But this is not what the Church teaches and enjoins. The worship she offers to God, all good and great, is a continuous profession of Catholic faith and a continuous exercise of hope and charity, as Augustine puts it tersely. "God is to be worshipped," he says, "by faith, hope and charity." In the sacred liturgy we profess the Catholic faith explicitly and openly, not only by the celebration of the mysteries, and by offering the holy sacrifice and administering the sacraments, but also by saying or singing the credo or Symbol of the faith - it is indeed the sign and badge, as it were, of the Christian - along with other texts, and likewise by the reading of holy scripture, written under the inspiration of the Holy Ghost. The entire liturgy, therefore, has the Catholic faith for its content, inasmuch as it bears public witness to the faith of the Church.

48. For this reason, whenever there was question of defining a truth revealed by God, the Sovereign Pontiff and the Councils in their recourse to the "theological sources," as they are called, have not seldom drawn many an argument from this sacred science of the liturgy.[...]Hence the well-known and venerable maxim, "Legem credendi lex statuat supplicandi" - let the rule for prayer determine the rule of belief. The sacred liturgy, consequently, does not decide or determine independently and of itself what is of Catholic faith. More properly, since the liturgy is also a profession of eternal truths, and subject, as such, to the supreme teaching authority of the Church, it can supply proofs and testimony, quite clearly, of no little value, towards the determination of a particular point of Christian doctrine. But if one desires to differentiate and describe the relationship between faith and the sacred liturgy in absolute and general terms, it is perfectly correct to say, "Lex credendi legem statuat supplicandi" - let the rule of belief determine the rule of prayer. The same holds true for the other theological virtues also, "In . . . fide, spe, caritate continuato desiderio semper oramus" - we pray always, with constant yearning in faith, hope and charity.

— Pope Pius XII (1947)

The inter-relationship of liturgy, belief and life has long been an issue for missionaries, such as the Chinese Rites Controversy, in particular relating to how liturgical and para-liturgical rubrics may need to be selected and localized to suit local sensibilities and meet needs.

=== Liturgical theology ===
In the interpretation of liturgical theology many theologians, espoused for example by some Traditionalist Catholics, see liturgy as a result of the organic development of doctrine, as binding, and supported by Mediator Dei, they hold that the divine elements of liturgy cannot be changed by man. The pope states:

50. The sacred liturgy does, in fact, include divine as well as human elements. The former, instituted as they have been by God, cannot be changed in any way by men. But the human components admit of various modifications, as the needs of the age, circumstance and the good of souls may require, and as the ecclesiastical hierarchy, under guidance of the Holy Spirit, may have authorized.

— Pope Pius XII (1947)

In this interpretation, Prosper of Aquitaine's formulation establishes the credence of certain Christian doctrines by placing their source in the Church's authentic liturgical rites, thus describing the liturgy itself as a deposit of extra-Biblical Christian revelation (that is, Apostolic tradition), to which, in addition to Scripture, those who wished to know true doctrine could also refer. It is based on the prayer texts of the Church, that is, the Church's liturgy. In the Early Church, there was liturgical tradition before there was a common creed, and before there was an officially sanctioned biblical canon. These liturgical traditions provided the theological (and doctrinal) framework for establishing the creeds and canon.

== Protestantism ==
According to theologian Mary-Anne Plaatjies-van Huffel, whereas Catholic theology progresses from prayer (both liturgy and supplication) to belief to life: lex orandi, lex credendi, lex vivendi, Protestant theology orders from belief to prayer to life: lex credendi, lex orandi, lex vivendi.

=== Lutheranism ===
The principle of lex orandi, lex credendi is found in Lutheranism. Professor of theology J. Matthew Pinson writes that "Liturgical theology shapes the sermon, which in turn gives life to the Liturgy, preventing it from degenerating into dead ritualism, mysticism, or superstition."

=== Anglicanism ===
Anglican theology tends to be Augustinian and Reformed with a focus in the worship of the Church, and embodies a strongly evangelical liturgy. Thomas Cranmer's reformed liturgy Book of Common Prayer revised the liturgy following a principle of lex orandi, lex credendi to propagate to English congregations the Reformed doctrines of grace and justification by faith alone.

== Eastern Churches ==
Eastern Church's Patriarch Bartholomew I of Constantinople quoted this phrase in Latin on the occasion of the visit of Pope Benedict XVI, drawing from the phrase the lesson that, "in liturgy, we are reminded of the need to reach unity in faith as well as in prayer." Rather than regarding Tradition as something beneath Scripture or parallel to Scripture, Orthodox Christians consider Scripture the culmination and supreme expression of the church's divinely communicated Tradition. Councils and creeds recognized as authoritative are interpreted only as defining and more fully explicating the orthodox faith handed to the apostles, without adding to it.

== See also ==
- Adiaphora
- Orthopraxis
- Christian theological praxis
- Oral tradition
- Ritualism

== Bibliography ==
- Clerck, Paul de (1994). ""Lex orandi, lex credendi": The Original Sense and Historical Avatars of an Equivocal Adage". Studia Liturgica. 24 (2): 178–200. doi:10.1177/003932079402400206. S2CID 220290327.
- Crockett, William R. (June 1999). Eucharist: Symbol of Transformation. Collegeville, MN: Liturgical Press. ISBN 978-0-8146-6098-0.
- Stevenson, W. Taylor (1988). "Lex Orandi—Lex Credendi". In Sykes, Stephen; Booty, John E. (eds.). The Study of Anglicanism. London: SPCK/Fortress Press. pp. 174–188. ISBN 978-0-8006-2087-5.
- Wolf, William J. (1979). "Anglicanism and Its Spirit". In Wolf, William J.; Booty, John E.; Thomas, Owen C. (eds.). The Spirit of Anglicanism: Hooker, Maurice, Temple. New York: Morehouse-Barlow Company. ISBN 978-0-8192-1263-4.
