= Old Roman chant =

Liturgical vocal music of the Roman rite of the Early Christian Church

Old Roman chant is the liturgical plainchant repertory of the Roman rite of the early Christian Church. It was formerly performed in Rome, and, although it is closely related to Gregorian chant, the two are distinct. Unlike other chant traditions (such as Ambrosian chant, Mozarabic chant, and Gallican chant), Old Roman chant and Gregorian chant share essentially the same liturgy and the same texts. Many of their melodies are also closely related. Although primarily associated with the churches of Rome, the Old Roman chant was also performed in parts of central Italy, and it was possibly performed much more widely. Gregorian Chant gradually but completely supplanted Old Roman Chant between the 11th century and the 13th century AD.

== History ==
The chant that is now called "Old Roman" comes primarily from a small number of sources, including three graduals and two antiphoners from between 1071 and 1250. Although these are newer than many notated sources from other chant traditions, this chant is called "Old Roman" because it is believed to reflect a Roman oral tradition going back several centuries.

There are several theories concerning the origins of Gregorian and Old Roman chants, but one prominent hypothesis, supported by Apel and Snow, posits that both chant traditions derive from a common Roman ancestor in use circa 750 AD. In order to consolidate ecclesiastical power and strengthen their political ties to the power of the Roman church, the Franks, especially under the Carolingian rulers Pepin and Charlemagne, brought this older Roman chant north. There it was subsequently modified, influenced by local styles and Gallican chant, and categorized into the system of eight modes. This Carolingian, or Frankish-Roman, chant, became known as "Gregorian". In the meantime, the local chant remaining in Rome gradually evolved into the form in which it was eventually notated, at the same time that Gregorian was supplanting it in Rome.

Another theory, advanced by Hans Schmidt, suggests that what we now call the "Old Roman" chant reflected the use in the city churches in Rome, as opposed to the chants used in the Vatican for papal ceremonies, and that it was the latter that was brought north and evolved into Gregorian chant. This would explain the discrepancies between early Gregorian chant and the local Roman chant which were noticed during the Middle Ages. However, this remains a minority view.

In the case of other defunct chant traditions, such as the Gallican, Mozarabic, and Beneventan, it is conceivable that Roman pre-eminence in the West tended toward the supplanting of non-Roman liturgies and chant traditions. The supplanting of the local chant of Rome itself would seem to require some other explanation. Several factors influenced this. In the 10th century, virtually no musical manuscripts were notated in Italy. A pattern developed wherein Roman Popes imported chants from the German Holy Roman Emperors during the 10th and 11th centuries. For example, the Credo was added to the Roman rite at the behest of the German emperor Henry II in 1014. The local musical traditions in Rome had already been showing some Gregorian influence, and eventually the Gregorian was taken to be the authentic, original chant of Rome, a misconception that continues.

== General characteristics ==
Old Roman chant is largely defined by its role in the liturgy of the Roman rite, as distinguished from the northern "Gallic" liturgies such as the Gallican rite and the Ambrosian rite. Gregorian and Old Roman chants largely share the same liturgy, but Old Roman chant does not reflect some of the Carolingian changes made to the Roman liturgy. Both an Old Roman and a Gregorian version exist for most chants of the liturgy, using the same text in all but forty chants, with corresponding chants often using related melodies. The split between Gregorian and Old Roman appears to have taken place after 800, since the feast of All Saints, a relatively late addition to the liturgical calendar, has markedly different chants in the two traditions. The Old Roman tradition appears to have preserved the texts more faithfully; the Old Roman texts often resemble the earliest Carolingian sources more closely than the later Gregorian sources do.

Musically, there are a number of similarities between the Gregorian chants and their Old Roman counterparts. In addition to the similarities in texts noted above, corresponding Old Roman and Gregorian melodies often begin and end musical phrases at the same points. They use similar intonations for incipits, reciting tones, and cadences. Unlike most other chant traditions, they occasionally repeat words within a text, and the two traditions repeat such words in the same places. Corresponding chants in the two traditions are usually assigned to the same mode, although that appears to be the result of later Gregorian influence on the Old Roman repertory, as these analogous chants often have very distinct tonalities.

Related chants in the Gregorian and Old Roman repertories differ mostly in ornamentation and surface detail. Old Roman chants are much more stepwise and gently undulating than Gregorian chants. Skips, even of thirds, are much less common in Old Roman chants than Gregorian. Gregorian chants often have a pentatonic structure, reinforced by their skips, while Old Roman chants are simpler in structure but more ornate, with more individual notes. Old Roman chants have intricate melodic motion within a narrow ambitus, with small, repeating melodic motifs, which are common in the Italian chant traditions such as the Ambrosian and Beneventan. Old Roman chants are often highly melismatic, with melismas blending into one another and obscuring the underlying melodic structure.

== Repertoire ==
=== Chants of the Mass ===
The Ordinary of the Mass appears to have been borrowed directly from the Gregorian repertory. The Proper chants of the Mass show some special characteristics.

Introits in the Old Roman Mass retained the versus ad repetendum, a repeat of the verse, which had disappeared from the Gregorian chant by the 11th century. Musically, Old Roman Introits resembled their Gregorian counterparts, although the neumatic passages were more ornate and the syllabic passages were simpler.

Old Roman Graduals fall into the same centonization families as their Gregorian counterparts, although with variations. For example, there is a family of Old Roman Graduals related to the Iustus ut palma family of Gregorian Graduals, which is named after one of the Gregorian Graduals that belongs to this family, but the Old Roman version of Iustus ut palma does not itself belong to this family.

Old Roman Alleluias have a melodia secunda or alleluia secundus, an elaborate repetition of the opening jubilus, similar to the Alleluia in Ambrosian chants. There are fewer distinct Alleluia melodies than in the Gregorian repertory, and unlike the Gregorian Alleluias, some Old Roman Alleluias have verses in Greek.

Some Old Roman Offertories used a repeating neume called the torculus, such as a repeating pattern of the notes D-E-C. This formula is one of the most distinctive musical formulae in the repertory. Some Offertories also include extended melismas of a style not found in any other chant or chant tradition.

=== Chants of the Office ===
Less is known about the chants of the Office. There are only about half as many melodies among the Old Roman Responsories as in the Gregorian repertory. Originally, Old Roman Repertories repeated the respond in full after the verse. This practice survived for several of the major feasts. Later, most Old Roman Responsories repeated just a portion of the respond, a practice that was borrowed from the Gregorian convention. Virtually no Hymns are found in the Old Roman Offices; the larger number of Hymns in the Gregorian Offices reflects the later influence of Benedictine rule.
