= Choralschola =

Choir for singing Gregorian chant or plainsong

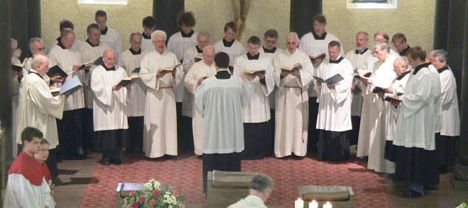
Choralschola

A Choralschola, known simply as schola, is a choir for singing Gregorian chant or plainsong. It consists traditionally of only men, but more recent groups sometimes also include female voices. Women's monastic communities have always had female scholas. A schola often performs in uniform. The group may perform in the liturgy of church services, but some specialized ensembles also perform concerts and recordings, such as the Choralschola der Wiener Hofburgkapelle and the Schola Gregoriana Pragensis.

Chant singing is usually responsorial, responses being sung by cantor, the congregation or by groups within the schola. Parts of the liturgy sung by the schola include the broadly fixed ordinary, and the more variable proper comprising the Introit, Gradual, Psalms, Tract, Sequence, calls to the Gospel, Offertory, and Communion.

Traditionally, the schola performs without accompaniment. After the Second Vatican Council, the frequency of Latin liturgy was reduced and is less known, with organ and instrumental accompaniment more commonly used to support the singing.

A choralschola is one of singing groups in the oratorio Laudato si', composed in 2016 by Peter Reulein on a libretto by Helmut Schlegel and aimed at showing the diversity of church music, the others being soloists, a children's choir and a mixed choir.
