= Schola Antiqua =

Schola Antiqua may refer to

- Schola Antiqua of New York John Blackley
- Schola Antiqua (Spanish early music group)
- Schola Antiqua of Chicago
