= Gregorian chant =

Form of song

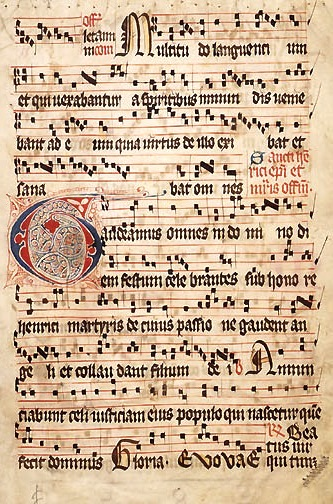
The Introit Gaudeamus omnes, scripted in square notation in the 14th–15th century Graduale Aboense, honors Henry, patron saint of Finland. Gaudeamus omnes

Gregorian chant is the central tradition of Western plainchant, a form of monophonic, unaccompanied sacred song in Latin (and occasionally Greek) of the Roman Catholic Church. Gregorian chant developed mainly in western and central Europe during the 9th and 10th centuries, with later additions and redactions. Although popular legend credits Pope Gregory I with inventing Gregorian chant, scholars believe that he only ordered a compilation of melodies throughout the whole Christian world, after having instructed his emissaries in the Schola Cantorum, where the neumatical notation was perfected, with the result of most of those melodies being a later Carolingian synthesis of the Old Roman chant and Gallican chant.

Gregorian chants were organized initially into four, then eight, and finally 12 modes. Typical melodic features include a characteristic ambitus, and also characteristic intervallic patterns relative to a referential mode final, incipits and cadences, the use of reciting tones at a particular distance from the final, around which the other notes of the melody revolve, and a vocabulary of musical motifs woven together through a process called centonization to create families of related chants. The scale patterns are organized against a background pattern formed of conjunct and disjunct tetrachords, producing a larger pitch system called the gamut. The chants can be sung by using six-note patterns called hexachords. Gregorian melodies are traditionally written using neumes, an early form of musical notation from which the modern four-line and five-line staff developed. Multi-voice elaborations of Gregorian chant, known as organum, were an early stage in the development of Western polyphony.

Gregorian chant was traditionally sung by choirs of men and boys in churches, or by women and men of religious orders in their chapels. It is the music of the Roman Rite, performed in the Mass and the monastic Office. Although Gregorian chant supplanted or marginalized the other indigenous plainchant traditions of the Christian West to become the official music of the Christian liturgy, Ambrosian chant still continues in use in Milan, and there are musicologists exploring both that and the Mozarabic chant of Christian Spain. Although Gregorian chant is no longer obligatory, the Roman Catholic Church still officially considers it the music most suitable for worship.

== History ==
=== Development of earlier plainchant ===
Singing has been part of the Christian liturgy since the earliest days of the Church. It is widely accepted that the psalmody of ancient Jewish worship significantly influenced and contributed to early Christian ritual and chant. Christians read Scriptures and sang chants, as their Jewish predecessors had done. Although new Christian liturgy was developed, the source of much of this Christian liturgy was Jewish psalmody. The source materials for newly emergent Christian chants were originally transmitted by Jews in sung form. Early Christian rites also incorporated elements of Jewish worship that survived in later chant tradition. Canonical hours have their roots in Jewish prayer hours. "Amen", "alleluia", and "hosanna" come from Hebrew, and the threefold "sanctus" derives from the threefold "kadosh" of the Kedushah.

The New Testament mentions singing hymns during the Last Supper: "When they had sung the hymn, they went out to the Mount of Olives" (Matthew 26.30). Other ancient witnesses such as Pope Clement I, Tertullian, St. Athanasius, and Egeria confirm the practice, although in poetic or obscure ways that shed little light on how music sounded during this period.

Musical elements that would later be used in the Roman Rite began to appear in the 3rd century. The Apostolic Tradition, attributed to the theologian Hippolytus, attests the singing of Hallel (Jewish) psalms with Alleluia as the refrain in early Christian agape feasts. Chants of the Office, sung during the canonical hours, have their roots in the early 4th century, when desert monks following St. Anthony introduced the practice of continuous psalmody, singing the complete cycle of 150 psalms each week. Around 375, antiphonal psalmody became popular in the Christian East; in 386, St. Ambrose introduced this practice to the West. In the fifth century, a singing school, the Schola Cantorum, was founded at Rome to provide training in church musicianship.

Scholars are still debating how plainchant developed during the 5th through the 9th centuries, as information from this period is scarce. Around 410, St. Augustine described the responsorial singing of a Gradual psalm at Mass. At c. 520, Benedict of Nursia established what is called the rule of St. Benedict, in which the protocol of the Divine Office for monastic use was laid down. Around 678, Roman chant was taught at York. Distinctive regional traditions of Western plainchant arose during this period, notably in the British Isles (Celtic chant), Spain (Mozarabic), Gaul (Gallican), and Italy (Old Roman, Ambrosian and Beneventan). These traditions may have evolved from a hypothetical year-round repertory of 5th-century plainchant after the western Roman Empire collapsed.

John the Deacon, biographer (c. 872) of Pope Gregory I, modestly claimed that the saint "compiled a patchwork antiphonary", unsurprisingly, given his considerable work with liturgical development. He reorganized the Schola Cantorum and established a more uniform standard in church services, gathering chants from among the regional traditions as widely as he could manage. Of those, he retained what he could, revised where necessary, and assigned particular chants to the various services. According to Donald Jay Grout, his goal was to organize the bodies of chants from diverse traditions into a uniform and orderly whole for use by the entire western region of the Church. His renowned love for music was recorded only 34 years after his death; the epitaph of Honorius testified that comparison to Gregory was already considered the highest praise for a music-loving pope. While later legends magnified his real achievements, these significant steps may account for why his name came to be attached to Gregorian chant.

=== Origins of mature plainchant ===
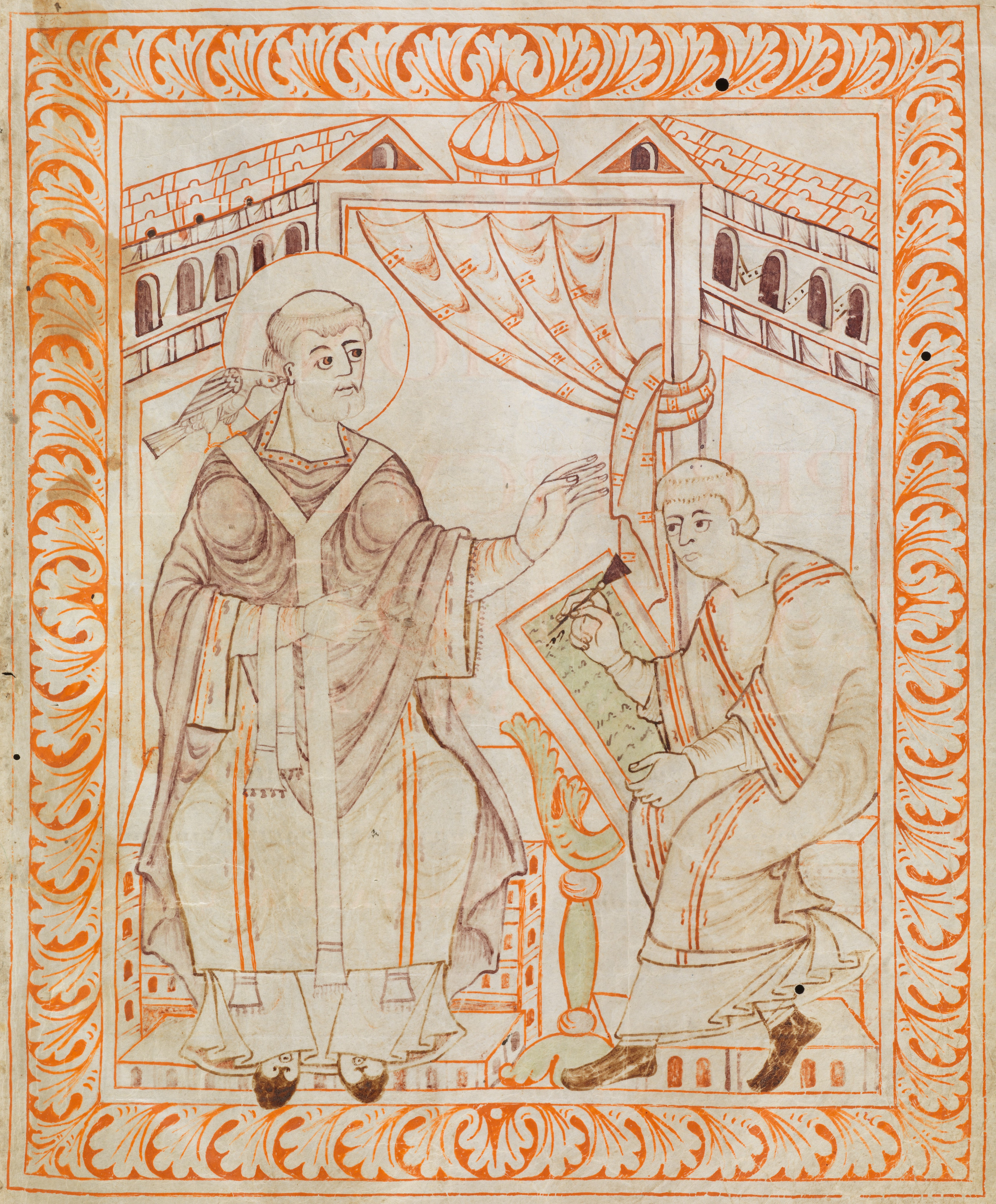
A dove representing the Holy Spirit sitting on Pope Gregory I's shoulder symbolizes Divine Inspiration.

The Gregorian repertory was further systematized for use in the Roman Rite, and scholars weigh the relative influences of Roman and Carolingian practices upon the development of plainchant. The late 8th century saw a steadily increasing influence of the Carolingian monarchs over the popes. During a visit to Gaul in 752–753, Pope Stephen II celebrated Mass using Roman chant. According to Charlemagne, his father Pepin abolished the local Gallican Rites in favor of the Roman use, to strengthen ties with Rome. Thirty years later (785–786), at Charlemagne's request, Pope Adrian I sent a papal sacramentary with Roman chants to the Carolingian court. According to James McKinnon, over a brief period in the 8th century, a project overseen by Chrodegang of Metz in the favorable atmosphere of the Carolingian monarchs, also compiled the core liturgy of the Roman Mass and promoted its use in Francia and throughout Gaul.

Willi Apel and Robert Snow assert a scholarly consensus that Gregorian chant developed around 750 from a synthesis of Roman and Gallican chants, and was commissioned by the Carolingian rulers in France. Andreas Pfisterer and Peter Jeffery have shown that older melodic essentials from Roman chant are clear in the synthesized chant repertory. There were other developments as well. Chants were modified, influenced by local styles and Gallican chant, and fitted into the theory of the ancient Greek octoechos system of modes in a manner that created what later came to be known as the western system of the eight church modes. The Metz project also invented an innovative musical notation, using freeform neumes to show the shape of a remembered melody. This notation was further developed over time, culminating in the introduction of staff lines (attributed to Guido d'Arezzo) in the early 11th century, what we know today as plainchant notation. The whole body of Frankish-Roman Carolingian chant, augmented with new chants to complete the liturgical year, coalesced into a single body of chant that was called "Gregorian".

The changes made in the new system of chants were so significant that they have led some scholars to speculate that it was named in honor of the contemporary Pope Gregory II. Nevertheless, the lore surrounding Pope Gregory I was sufficient to culminate in his portrayal as the actual author of Gregorian Chant. He was often depicted as receiving the dictation of plainchant from a dove representing the Holy Spirit, thus giving Gregorian chant the stamp of being divinely inspired. Scholars agree that the melodic content of much Gregorian Chant did not exist in that form in Gregory I's day. In addition, it is known definitively that the familiar neumatic system for notating plainchant had not been established in his time. Nevertheless, Gregory's authorship is popularly accepted by some as fact to this day.

=== Dissemination and hegemony ===
Gregorian chant appeared in a remarkably uniform state across Europe within a short time. Charlemagne, once elevated to Holy Roman Emperor, aggressively spread Gregorian chant throughout his empire to consolidate religious and secular power. From English and German sources, Gregorian chant spread north to Scandinavia, Iceland and Finland. In 885, Pope Stephen V banned the Slavonic liturgy, leading to the ascendancy of Gregorian chant in Eastern Catholic lands including Poland, Moravia and Slovakia.

The other plainchant repertories of the Christian West faced severe competition from the new Gregorian chant. Charlemagne continued his father's policy of favoring the Roman Rite over the local Gallican traditions. By the 9th century the Gallican rite and chant had effectively been eliminated, although not without local resistance. The Gregorian chant of the Sarum Rite displaced Celtic chant. Gregorian coexisted with Beneventan chant for over a century before Beneventan chant was abolished by papal decree (1058). Mozarabic chant survived the influx of the Visigoths and Moors, but not the Roman-backed prelates newly installed in Spain during the Reconquista. Restricted to a handful of dedicated chapels, modern Mozarabic chant is highly Gregorianized and bears no musical resemblance to its original form. Ambrosian chant alone survived to the present day, preserved in Milan due to the musical reputation and ecclesiastical authority of St. Ambrose.

Gregorian chant eventually replaced the local chant tradition of Rome itself, which is now known as Old Roman chant. In the 10th century, virtually no musical manuscripts were being notated in Italy. Instead, Roman Popes imported Gregorian chant from (German) Holy Roman Emperors during the 10th and 11th centuries. For example, the Credo was added to the Roman Rite at the behest of the Emperor Henry II in 1014. Reinforced by the legend of Pope Gregory, Gregorian chant was taken to be the authentic, original chant of Rome, a misconception that continues to this day. By the 12th and 13th centuries, Gregorian chant had supplanted or marginalized all the other Western plainchant traditions.

Later sources of these other chant traditions show an increasing Gregorian influence, such as occasional efforts to categorize their chants into the Gregorian modes. Similarly, the Gregorian repertory incorporated elements of these lost plainchant traditions, which can be identified by careful stylistic and historical analysis. For example, the Improperia of Good Friday are believed to be a remnant of the Gallican repertory.

=== Early sources and later revisions ===
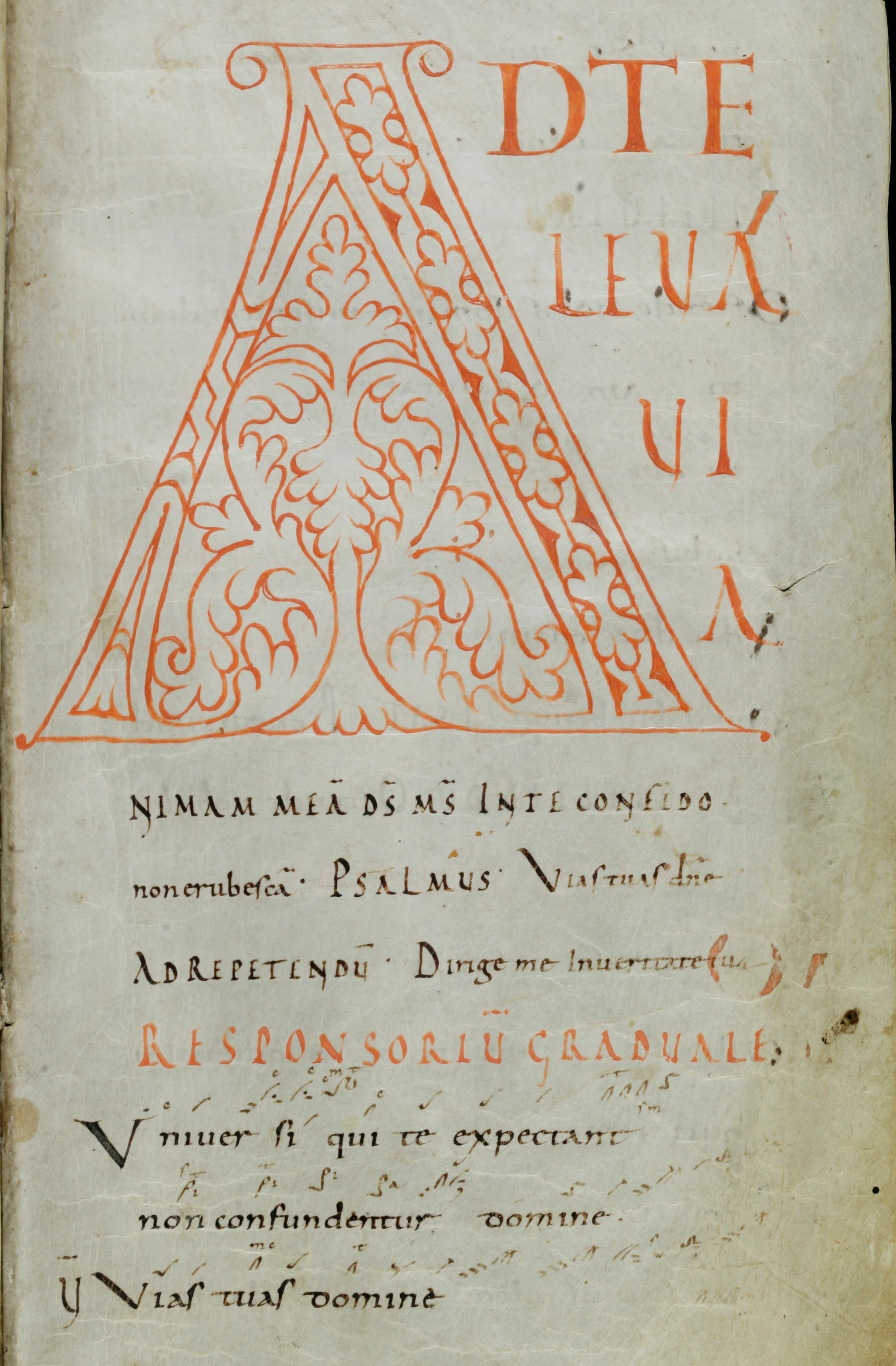
Two plainchants from the Mass Proper, written in adiastematic neumes, from Codex Sangallensis 359

Universi qui te expectant, Gradual for the Mass (first Sunday of Advent)
This chant corresponds to the second one on the manuscript folio above beneath the large rubric Responsorium Graduale; by Schola Antiqua of Chicago.

The first extant sources with musical notation were written around 930 (Graduale Laon). Before this, plainchant had been transmitted orally. Most scholars of Gregorian chant agree that the development of music notation assisted the dissemination of chant across Europe. The earlier notated manuscripts are primarily from Regensburg in Germany, St. Gall in Switzerland, Laon and St. Martial in France.

Gregorian chant has in its long history been subjected to a series of redactions to bring it up to changing contemporary tastes and practice. The more recent redaction undertaken in the Benedictine Abbey of St. Pierre, Solesmes, has turned into a huge undertaking to restore the allegedly corrupted chant to a hypothetical "original" state. Early Gregorian chant was revised to conform to the theoretical structure of the modes. In 1562–63, the Council of Trent banned most sequences. Guidette's Directorium chori, published in 1582, and the Editio medicea, published in 1614, drastically revised what was perceived as corrupt and flawed "barbarism" by making the chants conform to contemporary aesthetic standards. In 1811, the French musicologist Alexandre-Étienne Choron, as part of a conservative backlash following the liberal Catholic orders' inefficacy during the French Revolution, called for returning to the "purer" Gregorian chant of Rome over French corruptions.

In the late 19th century, early liturgical and musical manuscripts were unearthed and edited. Earlier, Dom Prosper Guéranger revived the monastic tradition in Solesmes. Re-establishing the Divine Office was among his priorities, but no proper chantbooks existed. Many monks were sent out to libraries throughout Europe to find relevant Chant manuscripts. In 1871, however, the old Medicea edition was reprinted (Pustet, Regensburg) which Pope Pius IX declared the only official version. In their firm belief that they were on the right way, Solesmes increased its efforts. In 1889, after decades of research, the monks of Solesmes released the first book in a planned series, the Paléographie Musicale. The incentive of its publication was to demonstrate the corruption of the 'Medicea' by presenting photographed notations originating from a great variety of manuscripts of one single chant, which Solesmes called forth as witnesses to assert their own reforms.

The monks of Solesmes brought in their heaviest artillery in this battle, as indeed the academically sound 'Paleo' was intended to be a war-tank, meant to abolish once and for all the corrupted Pustet edition. On the evidence of congruence throughout various manuscripts (which were duly published in facsimile editions with ample editorial introductions) Solesmes was able to work out a practical reconstruction. This reconstructed chant was academically praised, but rejected by Rome until 1903, when Pope Leo XIII died.

=== Twentieth century developments ===
Leo's successor, Pope Pius X, promptly accepted the Solesmes chant – now compiled as the Liber usualis – as authoritative. In 1904, the Vatican edition of the Solesmes chant was commissioned. Serious academic debates arose, primarily owing to stylistic liberties taken by the Solesmes editors to impose their controversial interpretation of rhythm. The Solesmes editions insert phrasing marks and note-lengthening episema and mora marks not found in the original sources.

Conversely, they omit significative letters found in the original sources, which give instructions for rhythm and articulation such as speeding up or slowing down. These editorial practices have placed the historical authenticity of the Solesmes interpretation in doubt. Ever since restoration of Chant was taken up in Solesmes, there have been lengthy discussions of exactly what course was to be taken. Some favored a strict academic rigour and wanted to postpone publications, while others concentrated on practical matters and wanted to supplant the corrupted tradition as soon as possible. Roughly a century later, there still exists a breach between a strict musicological approach and the practical needs of church choirs. Thus the performance tradition officially promulgated since the onset of the Solesmes restoration is substantially at odds with musicological evidence.

In his motu proprio Tra le sollecitudini, Pius X mandated the use of Gregorian chant, encouraging the faithful to sing the Ordinary of the Mass, although he reserved the singing of the Propers for males. While this custom is maintained in traditionalist Catholic communities (most of which allow all-female scholas as well, though), the Catholic Church no longer persists with this ban. The Second Vatican Council officially allowed worshipers to substitute other music, particularly sacred polyphony, in place of Gregorian chant, although it did reaffirm that Gregorian chant was "specially suited to the Roman liturgy", and therefore, "other things being equal, it should be given pride of place in liturgical services".

== Musical form ==
=== Melodic types ===
Gregorian chant is, as 'chant' implies, vocal music. The text, the phrases, words and eventually the syllables, can be sung in various ways. The most straightforward is recitation on the same tone, which is called "syllabic" as each syllable is sung to a single tone. Likewise, simple chants are often syllabic throughout with only a few instances where two or more notes are sung on one syllable. "Neumatic" chants are more embellished and ligatures, a connected group of notes, written as a single compound neume, abound in the text. Melismatic chants are the most ornate chants in which elaborate melodies are sung on long sustained vowels as in the Alleluia, ranging from five or six notes per syllable to over sixty in the more prolix melismata.

Epistle for the Solemn Mass of Easter Day
Example of liturgical recitative in Gregorian chant

Gregorian chants fall into two broad categories of melody: recitatives and free melodies. The simplest kind of melody is the liturgical recitative. Recitative melodies are dominated by a single pitch, called the reciting tone. Other pitches appear in melodic formulae for incipits, partial cadences, and full cadences. These chants are primarily syllabic. For example, the Collect for Easter consists of 127 syllables sung to 131 pitches, with 108 of these pitches being the reciting note A and the other 23 pitches flexing down to G. Liturgical recitatives are commonly found in the accentus chants of the liturgy, such as the intonations of the Collect, Epistle, and Gospel during the Mass, and in the direct psalmody of the Office.

Psalmodic chants, which intone psalms, include both recitatives and free melodies. Psalmodic chants include direct psalmody, antiphonal chants, and responsorial chants. In direct psalmody, psalm verses are sung without refrains to simple, formulaic tones. Most psalmodic chants are antiphonal and responsorial, sung to free melodies of varying complexity.

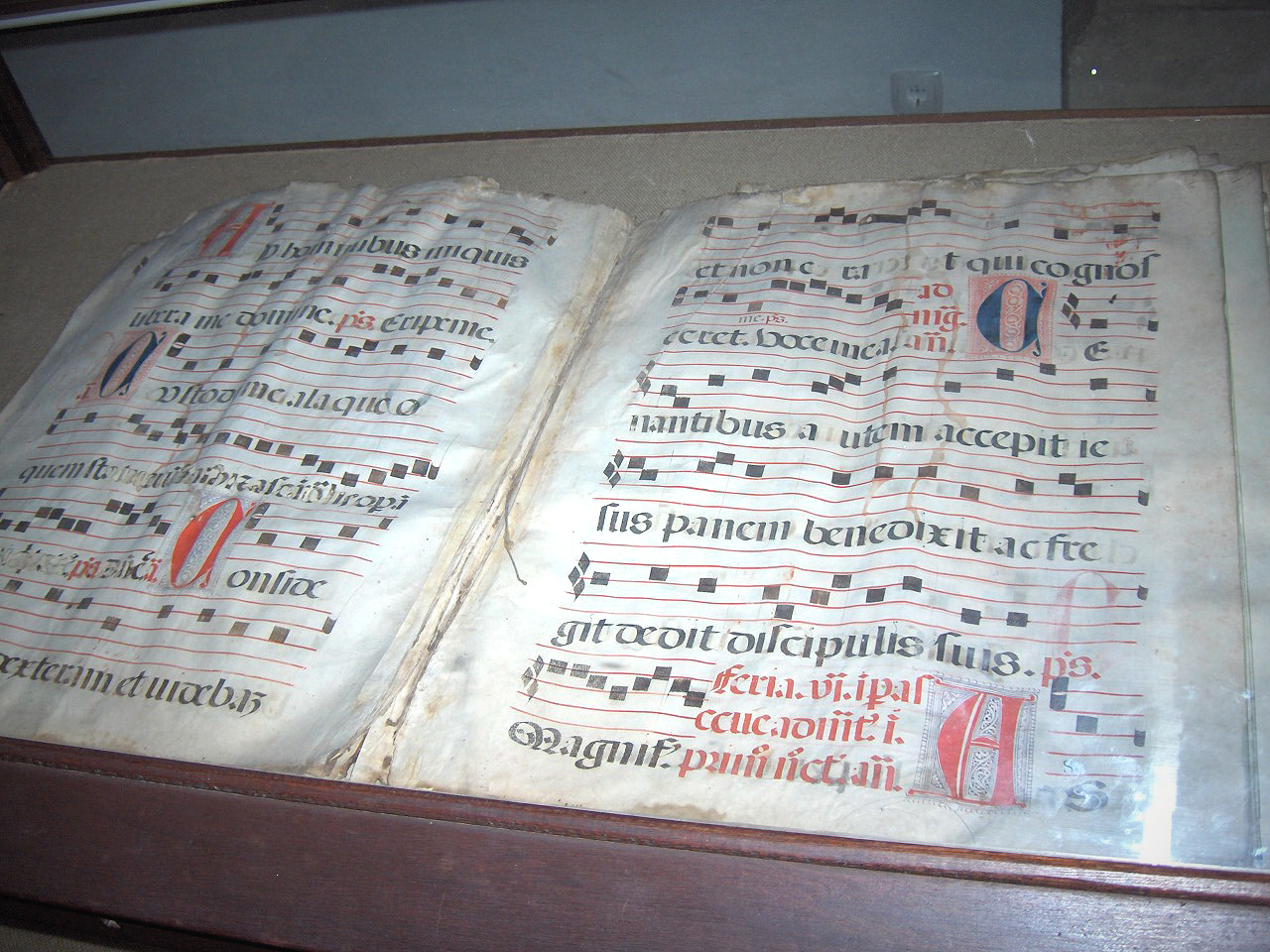
Antiphonary with Gregorian chants

Loquetur Dominus, Introit for Week XXXIV of Ordinary Time
Example of antiphonal psalmody in Gregorian chant

De profundis, tract for the Requiem Mass
Example of responsorial psalmody in Gregorian chant

Antiphonal chants such as the Introit, and Communion originally referred to chants in which two choirs sang in alternation, one choir singing verses of a psalm, the other singing a refrain called an antiphon. Over time, the verses were reduced in number, usually to just one psalm verse and the doxology, or even omitted entirely. Antiphonal chants reflect their ancient origins as elaborate recitatives through the reciting tones in their melodies. Ordinary chants, such as the Kyrie and Gloria, are not considered antiphonal chants, although they are often performed in antiphonal style.

Responsorial chants such as the Gradual, Alleluia, Offertory, and the Office Responsories originally consisted of a refrain called a respond sung by a choir, alternating with psalm verses sung by a soloist. Responsorial chants are often composed of an amalgamation of various stock musical phrases, pieced together in a practice called centonization. Tracts are melismatic settings of psalm verses and use frequent recurring cadences and they are strongly centonized.

Gregorian chant evolved to fulfill various functions in the Roman Catholic liturgy. Broadly speaking, liturgical recitatives are used for texts intoned by deacons or priests. Antiphonal chants accompany liturgical actions: the entrance of the officiant, the collection of offerings, and the distribution of the Eucharist. Responsorial chants expand on readings and lessons.

The non-psalmodic chants, including the Ordinary of the Mass, sequences, and hymns, were originally intended for congregational singing. The structure of their texts largely defines their musical style. In sequences, the same melodic phrase is repeated in each couplet. The strophic texts of hymns use the same syllabic melody for each stanza.

=== Modality ===
Early plainchant, like much of Western music, is believed to have been distinguished by the use of the diatonic scale. Modal theory, which postdates the composition of the core chant repertory, arises from a synthesis of two very different traditions: the speculative tradition of numerical ratios and species inherited from ancient Greece and a second tradition rooted in the practical art of cantus. The earliest writings that deal with both theory and practice include the Enchiriadis group of treatises, which circulated in the late ninth century and possibly have their roots in an earlier, oral tradition. In contrast to the ancient Greek system of tetrachords (a collection of four continuous notes) that descend by two tones and a semitone, the Enchiriadis writings base their tone-system on a tetrachord that corresponds to the four finals of chant, D, E, F, and G. The disjunct tetrachords in the Enchiriadis system have been the subject of much speculation, because they do not correspond to the diatonic framework that became the standard Medieval scale (for example, there is a high F♯, a note not recognized by later Medieval writers). A diatonic scale with a chromatically alterable b/b♭ was first described by Hucbald, who adopted the tetrachord of the finals (D, E, F, G) and constructed the rest of the system following the model of the Greek Greater and Lesser Perfect Systems. These were the first steps in forging a theoretical tradition that corresponded to chant.

Around 1025, Guido d'Arezzo revolutionized Western music with the development of the gamut, in which pitches in the singing range were organized into overlapping hexachords. Hexachords could be built on C (the natural hexachord, C–D–E^F–G–A), F (the soft hexachord, using a B♭, F–G–A^B♭–C–D), or G (the hard hexachord, using a B-natural, G-A-B^C-D-E). The B♭ was an integral part of the system of hexachords rather than an accidental. The use of notes outside of this collection was described as musica ficta.

Gregorian chant was categorized into eight modes, influenced by the eightfold division of Byzantine chants called the oktoechos. Each mode is distinguished by its final, dominant, and ambitus. The final is the ending note, which is usually an important note in the overall structure of the melody. The dominant is a secondary pitch that usually serves as a reciting tone in the melody. Ambitus refers to the range of pitches used in the melody. Melodies whose final is in the middle of the ambitus, or which have only a limited ambitus, are categorized as plagal, while melodies whose final is in the lower end of the ambitus and have a range of over five or six notes are categorized as authentic. Although corresponding plagal and authentic modes have the same final, they have different dominants. The existent pseudo-Greek names of the modes, rarely used in medieval times, derive from a misunderstanding of the Ancient Greek modes; the prefix "hypo-" (Greek 'under') indicates a plagal mode, where the melody moves below the final. In contemporary Latin manuscripts the modes are simply called Protus authentus/plagalis, Deuterus, Tritus and Tetrardus: the 1st mode, authentic or plagal, the 2nd mode etc. In the Roman Chantbooks the modes are indicated by Roman numerals.

Modes 1 and 2 are the authentic and plagal modes ending on D, sometimes called Dorian and Hypodorian.
Modes 3 and 4 are the authentic and plagal modes ending on E, sometimes called Phrygian and Hypophrygian.
Modes 5 and 6 are the authentic and plagal modes ending on F, sometimes called Lydian and Hypolydian.
Modes 7 and 8 are the authentic and plagal modes ending on G, sometimes called Mixolydian and Hypomixolydian.

Although the modes with melodies ending on A, B, and C are sometimes referred to as Aeolian, Locrian, and Ionian, these are not considered distinct modes and are treated as transpositions of whichever mode uses the same set of hexachords. The actual pitch of the Gregorian chant is not fixed, so the piece can be sung in whichever range is most comfortable.

Certain classes of Gregorian chant have a separate musical formula for each mode, allowing one section of the chant to transition smoothly into the next section, such as the psalm verses that are sung between the repetition of antiphons, or the Gloria Patri. Thus we find models for the recitation of psalmverses, Alleluia and Gloria Patri for all eight modes.

Not every Gregorian chant fits neatly into Guido's hexachords or into the system of eight modes. For example, there are chants – especially from German sources – whose neumes suggest a warbling of pitches between the notes E and F, outside the hexachord system, or in other words, employing a form of chromaticism. Early Gregorian chant, like Ambrosian and Old Roman chant, whose melodies are most closely related to Gregorian, did not use the modal system. The great need for a system of organizing chants lies in the need to link antiphons with standard tones, as in for example, the psalmody at the Office. Using Psalm Tone i with an antiphon in Mode 1 makes for a smooth transition between the end of the antiphon and the intonation of the tone, and the ending of the tone can then be chosen to provide a smooth transition back to the antiphon. As the modal system gained acceptance, Gregorian chants were edited to conform to the modes, especially during 12th-century Cistercian reforms. Finals were altered, melodic ranges reduced, melismata trimmed, B♭s eliminated, and repeated words removed. Despite these attempts to impose modal consistency, some chants – notably Communions – defy simple modal assignment. For example, in four medieval manuscripts, the Communion Circuibo was transcribed using a different mode in each.

=== Musical idiom ===
Several features besides modality contribute to the musical idiom of Gregorian chant, giving it a distinctive musical flavor. Melodic motion is primarily stepwise. Skips of a third are common, and larger skips far more common than in other plainchant repertories such as Ambrosian chant or Beneventan chant. Gregorian melodies are more likely to traverse a seventh than a full octave, so that melodies rarely travel from D up to the D an octave higher, but often travel from D to the C a seventh higher, using such patterns as D–F–G–A–C. Gregorian melodies often explore chains of pitches, such as F–A–C, around which the other notes of the chant gravitate. Within each mode, certain incipits and cadences are preferred, which the modal theory alone does not explain. Chants often display complex internal structures that combine and repeat musical subphrases. This occurs notably in the Offertories; in chants with shorter, repeating texts such as the Kyrie and Agnus Dei; and in longer chants with clear textual divisions such as the Great Responsories, the Gloria, and the Credo.

Chants sometimes fall into melodically related groups. The musical phrases centonized to create Graduals and Tracts follow a musical "grammar" of sorts. Certain phrases are used only at the beginnings of chants, or only at the end, or only in certain combinations, creating musical families of chants such as the Iustus ut palma family of Graduals. Several Introits in mode 3, including Loquetur Dominus above, exhibit melodic similarities. Mode III (E authentic) chants have C as a dominant, so C is the expected reciting tone. These mode III Introits, however, use both G and C as reciting tones, and often begin with a decorated leap from G to C to establish this tonality. Similar examples exist throughout the repertory.

=== Notation ===
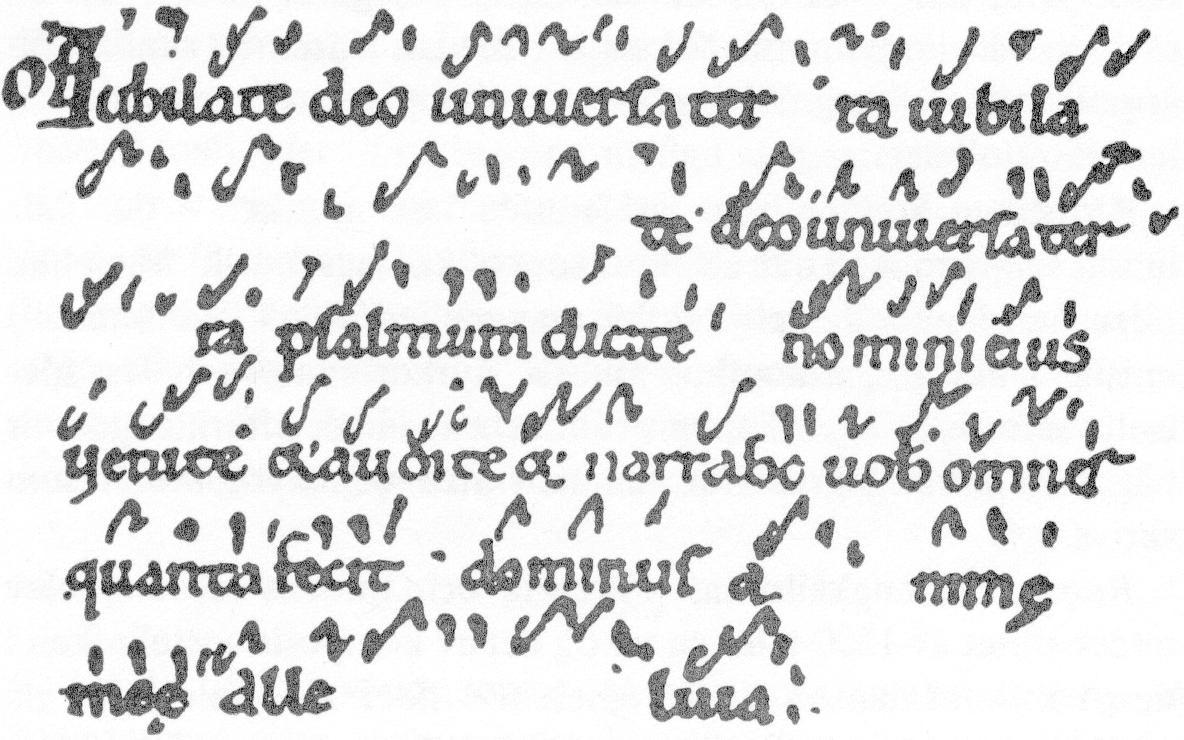
Offertory Iubilate deo universa terra in unheightened neume

The earliest notated sources of Gregorian chant (written c. 950) used symbols called neumes (Greek: sign (of the hand)) to indicate tone-movements and relative duration within each syllable. A sort of musical stenography that seems to focus on gestures and tone-movements but not the specific pitches of individual notes, nor the relative starting pitches of each neume. Given the fact that Chant was learned in an oral tradition in which the texts and melodies were sung from memory, this was obviously not necessary. The neumatic manuscripts display great sophistication and precision in notation and a wealth of graphic signs to indicate the musical gesture and proper pronunciation of the text.

Scholars postulate that this practice may have been derived from cheironomic hand-gestures, the ekphonetic notation of Byzantine chant, punctuation marks, or diacritical accents. Later adaptations and innovations included the use of a dry-scratched line or an inked line or two lines, marked C or F showing the relative pitches between neumes. Consistent relative heightening first developed in the Aquitaine region, particularly at St. Martial de Limoges, in the first half of the eleventh century. Many German-speaking areas, however, continued to use unpitched neumes into the twelfth century. Additional symbols developed, such as the custos, placed at the end of a system to show the next pitch. Other symbols indicated changes in articulation, duration, or tempo, such as a letter "t" to indicate a tenuto. Another form of early notation used a system of letters corresponding to different pitches, much as Shaker music is notated.

Liber usualis in square notation (excerpt from the Kyrie eleison (Orbis factor))

By the 13th century, the neumes of Gregorian chant were usually written in square notation on a four-line staff with a clef, as in the Graduale Aboense pictured above. In square notation, small groups of ascending notes on a syllable are shown as stacked squares, read from bottom to top, while descending notes are written with diamonds read from left to right. When a syllable has a large number of notes, a series of smaller such groups of neumes are written in succession, read from left to right. The oriscus, quilisma, and liquescent neumes indicate special vocal treatments, that have been largely neglected due to uncertainty as to how to sing them. Since the 1970s, with the influential insights of Dom Eugène Cardine (see below under 'rhythm'), ornamental neumes have received more attention from both researchers and performers. B♭ is indicated by a "b-mollum" (Latin: soft), a rounded undercaste 'b' placed to the left of the entire neume in which the note occurs, as shown in the "Kyrie" to the right. When necessary, a "b-durum" (Latin: hard), written squarely, indicates B-natural and serves to cancel the b-mollum. This system of square notation is standard in modern chantbooks.

== Performance ==
=== Texture ===
Gregorian chant was originally used for singing the Office (by male and female religious) and for singing the parts of the Mass pertaining to the lay faithful (male and female), the celebrant (priest, always male) and the choir (composed of male ordained clergy, except in convents). Outside the larger cities, the number of available clergy dropped, and lay men started singing these parts. The choir was considered an official liturgical duty reserved to clergy, so women were not allowed to sing in the Schola Cantorum or other choirs except in convents where women were permitted to sing the Office and the parts of the Mass pertaining to the choir as a function of their consecrated life.

Chant was normally sung in unison. Later innovations included tropes, which is a new text sung to the same melodic phrases in a melismatic chant (repeating an entire Alleluia-melody on a new text for instance, or repeating a full phrase with a new text that comments on the previously sung text) and various forms of organum, (improvised) harmonic embellishment of chant melodies focusing on octaves, fifths, fourths, and, later, thirds. Neither tropes nor organum, however, belong to the chant repertory proper. The main exception to this is the sequence, whose origins lay in troping the extended melisma of Alleluia chants known as the jubilus, but the sequences, like the tropes, were later officially suppressed. The Council of Trent struck sequences from the Gregorian corpus, except those for Easter, Pentecost, Corpus Christi and All Souls' Day.

Not much is known about the particular vocal stylings or performance practices used for Gregorian chant in the Middle Ages. On occasion, the clergy was urged to have their singers perform with more restraint and piety. This suggests that virtuosic performances occurred, contrary to the modern stereotype of Gregorian chant as slow-moving mood music. This tension between musicality and piety goes far back; Gregory the Great himself criticized the practice of promoting clerics based on their charming singing rather than their preaching. However, Odo of Cluny, a renowned monastic reformer, praised the intellectual and musical virtuosity to be found in chant:

For in these [Offertories and Communions] there are the most varied kinds of ascent, descent, repeat ..., delight for the cognoscenti, difficulty for the beginners, and an admirable organization ... that widely differs from other chants; they are not so much made according to the rules of music ... but rather evince the authority and validity ... of music.

True antiphonal performance by two alternating choruses still occurs, as in certain German monasteries. However, antiphonal chants are generally performed in responsorial style by a solo cantor alternating with a chorus. This practice appears to have begun in the Middle Ages. Another medieval innovation had the solo cantor sing the opening words of responsorial chants, with the full chorus finishing the end of the opening phrase. This innovation allowed the soloist to fix the pitch of the chant for the chorus and to cue the choral entrance.

=== Rhythm ===
Given the oral teaching tradition of Gregorian chant, modern reconstruction of intended rhythm from the written notation of Gregorian chant has always been a source of debate among modern scholars. To complicate matters further, many ornamental neumes used in the earliest manuscripts pose difficulties on the interpretation of rhythm. Certain neumes such as the pressus, pes quassus, strophic neumes may indicate repeated notes, lengthening by repercussion, in some cases with added ornaments. By the 13th century, with the widespread use of square notation, most chant was sung with an approximately equal duration allotted to each note, although Jerome of Moravia cites exceptions in which certain notes, such as the final notes of a chant, are lengthened.

While the standard repertory of Gregorian Chant was partly being supplanted by new forms of polyphony, the earlier melo-rhythmic refinements of monophonic chant seem to have fallen into disuse. Later redactions such as the Editio medicaea of 1614 rewrote chant so that melismata, with their melodic accent, fell on accented syllables. This aesthetic held sway until the re-examination of chant in the late 19th century by such scholars as Peter Wagner, Pothier, and Mocquereau, who fell into two camps.

One school of thought, including Wagner, Jammers, and Lipphardt, advocated imposing rhythmic meters on chants, although they disagreed on how that should be done. An opposing interpretation, represented by Pothier and Mocquereau, supported a free rhythm of equal note values, although some notes are lengthened for textual emphasis or musical effect. The modern Solesmes editions of Gregorian chant follow this interpretation. Mocquereau divided melodies into two- and three-note phrases, each beginning with an ictus, akin to a beat, notated in chantbooks as a small vertical mark. These basic melodic units combined into larger phrases through a complex system expressed by cheironomic hand-gestures. This approach prevailed during the twentieth century, propagated by Justine Ward's program of music education for children, until the liturgical role of chant was diminished after the liturgical reforms of Pope Paul VI, and new scholarship "essentially discredited" Mocquereau's rhythmic theories.

Common modern practice favors performing Gregorian chant with no beat or regular metric accent, largely for aesthetic reasons. The text determines the accent while the melodic contour determines the phrasing. The note lengthenings recommended by the Solesmes school remain influential, though not prescriptive.

Dom Eugène Cardine (1905–1988), a monk from Solesmes, published his Semiologie Gregorienne in 1970 in which he clearly explains the musical significance of the neumes of the early chant manuscripts. Cardine shows the great diversity of neumes and graphic variations of the basic shape of a particular neume, which can not be expressed in the square notation. This variety in notation must have served a practical purpose and therefore a musical significance. Nine years later, the Graduale Triplex was published, in which the Roman Gradual, containing all the chants for Mass in a Year's cycle, appeared with the neumes of the two most important manuscripts copied under and over the 4-line staff of the square notation. The Graduale Triplex made widely accessible the original notation of St. Gallen and Laon (compiled after 930 AD) in a single chantbook and was a huge step forward. Dom Cardine had many students who have each in their own way continued their semiological studies, some of whom also started experimenting in applying the newly understood principles in performance practice.

The studies of Cardine and his students (Godehard Joppich, Luigi Augustoni, Johannes B. Göschl, Marie-Noël Colette, Rupert Fischer, Marie-Claire Billecocq, Alexander M. Schweitzer to name a few) have clearly demonstrated that rhythm in Gregorian chant as notated in the 10th century rhythmic manuscripts (notably St. Gallen and Laon) manifest such rhythmic diversity and melodic – rhythmic ornamentations for which there is hardly a living performance tradition in the Western world. Contemporary groups that endeavour to sing according to the manuscript traditions have evolved after 1975. Some practising researchers favour a closer look at non-Western (liturgical) traditions, in such cultures where the tradition of modal monophony was never abandoned.

Another group with different views are the mensuralists or the proportionalists, who maintain that rhythm has to be interpreted proportionately, where shorts are exactly half the longs. This school of interpretation claims the support of historical authorities such as St Augustine, Remigius, Guido and Aribo. This view is advocated by John Blackley and his Schola Antiqua New York.

Recent research in the Netherlands by Dr. Dirk van Kampen has indicated that the authentic rhythm of Gregorian chant in the 10th century includes both proportional elements and elements that are in agreement with semiology. Starting with the expectation that the rhythm of Gregorian chant (and thus the duration of the individual notes) anyway adds to the expressivity of the sacred Latin texts, several word-related variables were studied for their relationship with several neume-related variables, exploring these relationships in a sample of introit chants using such statistical methods as correlational analysis and multiple regression analysis.

Beside the length of the syllables (measured in tenths of seconds), each text syllable was evaluated in terms of its position within the word to which it belongs, defining such variables as "the syllable has or has not the main accent", "the syllable is or is not at the end of a word", etc., and in terms of the particular sounds produced (for instance, the syllable contains the vowel "i"). The various neume elements were evaluated by attaching different duration values to them, both in terms of semiological propositions (nuanced durations according to the manner of neume writing in Chris Hakkennes' Graduale Lagal), and in terms of fixed duration values that were based on mensuralistic notions, however with ratios between short and long notes ranging from 1 : 1, via 1 : 1.2, 1 : 1.4, etc. to 1 : 3. To distinguish short and long notes, tables were consulted that were established by Van Kampen in an unpublished comparative study regarding the neume notations according to Sankt Gallen and Laon codices. With some exceptions, these tables confirm the short vs. long distinctions in Cardine's Semiologie Gregorienne.

The lengths of the neumes were given values by adding up the duration values for the separate neume elements, each time following a particular hypothesis concerning the rhythm of Gregoriant chant. Both the syllable lengths and the neume lengths were also expressed in relation to the total duration of the syllables, resp. neumes for a word (contextual variables). Correlating the various word and neume variables, substantial correlations were found for the word variables 'accented syllable' and 'contextual syllable duration'. Moreover, it could be established that the multiple correlation (R) between the two types of variables reaches its maximum (R is about 0.80) if the neumatic elements are evaluated according to the following rules of duration: (a) neume elements that represent short notes in neumes consisting of at least two notes have duration values of 1 time; (b) neume elements that represent long notes in neumes consisting of at least two notes have duration values of 2 times; (c) neumes consisting of only one note are characterized by flexible duration values (with an average value of 2 times), which take over the duration values of the syllables to match.

The distinction between the first two rules and the latter rule can also be found in early treatises on music, introducing the terms metrum and rhythmus. As it could also be demonstrated by Van Kampen that melodic peaks often coincide with the word accent (see also), the conclusion seems warranted that the Gregorian melodies enhance the expressiveness of the Latin words by mimicking to some extent both the accentuation of the sacred words (pitch differences between neumes) and the relative duration of the word syllables (by paying attention to well-defined length differences between the individual notes of a neume).

During the seventeenth through nineteenth centuries in France, the system of rhythmic notation became standardized, with printers and editors of chant books employing only four rhythmic values. Recent research by Christopher Holman indicates that chants whose texts are in a regular meter could even be altered to be performed in time signatures.

=== Melodic restitution ===
Recent developments involve an intensifying of the semiological approach according to Dom Cardine, which also gave a new impetus to the research into melodic variants in various manuscripts of chant. On the basis of this ongoing research it has become obvious that the Graduale and other chantbooks contain many melodic errors, some very consistently, (the mis-interpretation of third and eighth mode) necessitating a new edition of the Graduale according to state-of-the-art melodic restitutions. Since the 1970 a melodic restitution group of AISCGre (International Society for the Study of Gregorian Chant) has worked on an "editio magis critica" as requested by the 2. Vatican Council Constitution "Sacrosanctum Concilium". As a response to this need and following the Holy See's invitation to edit a more critical edition, in 2011 the first volume "De Dominicis et Festis" of the Graduale Novum Editio Magis Critica Iuxta SC 117 was published by Libreria Editrice Vatican and ConBrio Verlagsgesellschaft, Regensburg.

In this approach the so-called earlier 'rhythmic' manuscripts of unheightened neumes that carry a wealth of melo-rhythmic information but not of exact pitches, are compared in large tables of comparison with relevant later 'melodic' manuscripts' that are written on lines or use double alphabetic and neumes notation over the text, but as a rule have less rhythmic refinement compared to the earlier group. However, the comparison between the two groups has made it possible to correct what are obvious mistakes. In other instances it is not so easy to find a consensus. In 1984 Chris Hakkennes published his own transcription of the Graduale Triplex. He devised a new graphic adaptation of square notation 'simplex' in which he integrated the rhythmic indications of the two most relevant sources, that of Laon and Sankt Gallen.

Referring to these manuscripts, he called his own transcription Gradual Lagal. Furthermore, while making the transcription, he cross-checked with the melodic manuscripts to correct modal errors or other melodic errors found in the Graduale Romanum. His intention was to provide a corrected melody in rhythmic notation but above all – he was also a choirmaster – suited for practical use, therefore a simplex, integrated notation. Although fully admitting the importance of Hakkennes' melodic revisions, the rhythmical solution suggested in the Graduale Lagal was actually found by Van Kampen (see above) to be rather modestly related to the text of the chant.

== Liturgical functions ==
Gregorian chant is sung in the Office during the canonical hours and in the liturgy of the Mass. Texts known as accentus are intoned by bishops, priests, and deacons, mostly on a single reciting tone with simple melodic formulae at certain places in each sentence. More complex chants are sung by trained soloists and choirs. The Graduale Romanum contains the proper chants of the Mass (i.e., Introit, Gradual, Alleluia, Tract, Offertory, Communion) and the complete Kyriale (the collection of Mass Ordinary settings). The Liber usualis contains the chants for the Graduale Romanum and the most commonly used Office chants.

=== Proper chants of the Mass ===
The Introit, Gradual, Alleluia, Tract, Sequence, Offertory and Communion chants are part of the Proper of the Mass. "Proprium Missae" in Latin refers to the chants of the Mass that have their proper individual texts for each Sunday throughout the annual cycle, as opposed to 'Ordinarium Missae' which have fixed texts (but various melodies) (Kyrie, Gloria, Sanctus, Benedictus, Agnus Dei).

Introits cover the procession of the officiants. Introits are antiphonal chants, typically consisting of an antiphon, a psalm verse, a repeat of the antiphon, an intonation of the Gloria Patri Doxology, and a final repeat of the antiphon. Reciting tones often dominate their melodic structures.

Graduals are responsorial chants that follow the reading of the Epistle. Graduals usually result from centonization; stock musical phrases are assembled like a patchwork to create the full melody of the chant, creating families of musically related melodies. Graduals are accompanied by an elaborate Verse, so that it actually consists in two different parts, A B. Often the first part is sung again, creating a 'rondeau' A B A. At least the verse, if not the complete gradual, is for the solo cantor and are in elaborate, ornate style with long, wide-ranged melismata.

The Alleluia is known for the jubilus, an extended joyful melisma on the last vowel of 'Alleluia'. The Alleluia is also in two parts, the alleluia proper and the psalmverse, by which the Alleluia is identified (Alleluia V. Pascha nostrum). The last melisma of the verse is the same as the jubilus attached to the Alleluia. Alleluias are not sung during penitential times, such as Lent. Instead, a Tract is chanted, usually with texts from the Psalms.

Sequences are sung poems based on couplets. Although many sequences are not part of the liturgy and thus not part of the Gregorian repertory proper, Gregorian sequences include such well-known chants as Victimae paschali laudes and Veni Sancte Spiritus. According to Notker Balbulus, an early sequence writer, their origins lie in the addition of words to the long melismata of the jubilus of Alleluia chants.

=== Ordinary chants of the Mass ===
The Kyrie, Gloria, Credo, Sanctus, Benedictus and Agnus Dei use the same text in every service of the Mass. Because they follow the regular invariable "order" of the Mass, these chants are called "Ordinary".

The Kyrie consists of a threefold repetition of "Kyrie eleison" ("Lord, have mercy"), a threefold repetition of "Christe eleison" ("Christ have mercy"), followed by another threefold repetition of "Kyrie eleison." In older chants, "Kyrie eleison imas" ("Lord, have mercy on us") can be found. The Kyrie is distinguished by its use of the Greek language instead of Latin. Because of the textual repetition, various musical repeat structures occur in these chants. The following, Kyrie ad. lib. VI as transmitted in a Cambrai manuscript, uses the form ABA CDC EFE', with shifts in tessitura between sections. The E' section, on the final "Kyrie eleison", itself has an aa'b structure, contributing to the sense of climax.

Kyrie 55, Vatican ad lib. VI, from Cambrai, Bibl. Mun. 61, fo.155v
As transcribed by David Hiley; example of musical repeat structures in Gregorian chant

The Gloria recites the Greater Doxology, and the Credo intones the Nicene Creed. Because of the length of these texts, these chants often break into musical subsections corresponding with textual breaks. Because the Credo was the last Ordinary chant to be added to the Mass, there are relatively few Credo melodies in the Gregorian corpus.

The Sanctus and the Agnus Dei, like the Kyrie, also contain repeated texts, which their musical structures often exploit.

Technically, the Ite missa est and the Benedicamus Domino, which conclude the Mass, belong to the Ordinary. They have their own Gregorian melodies, but because they are short and simple, and have rarely been the subject of later musical composition, they are often omitted in discussion.

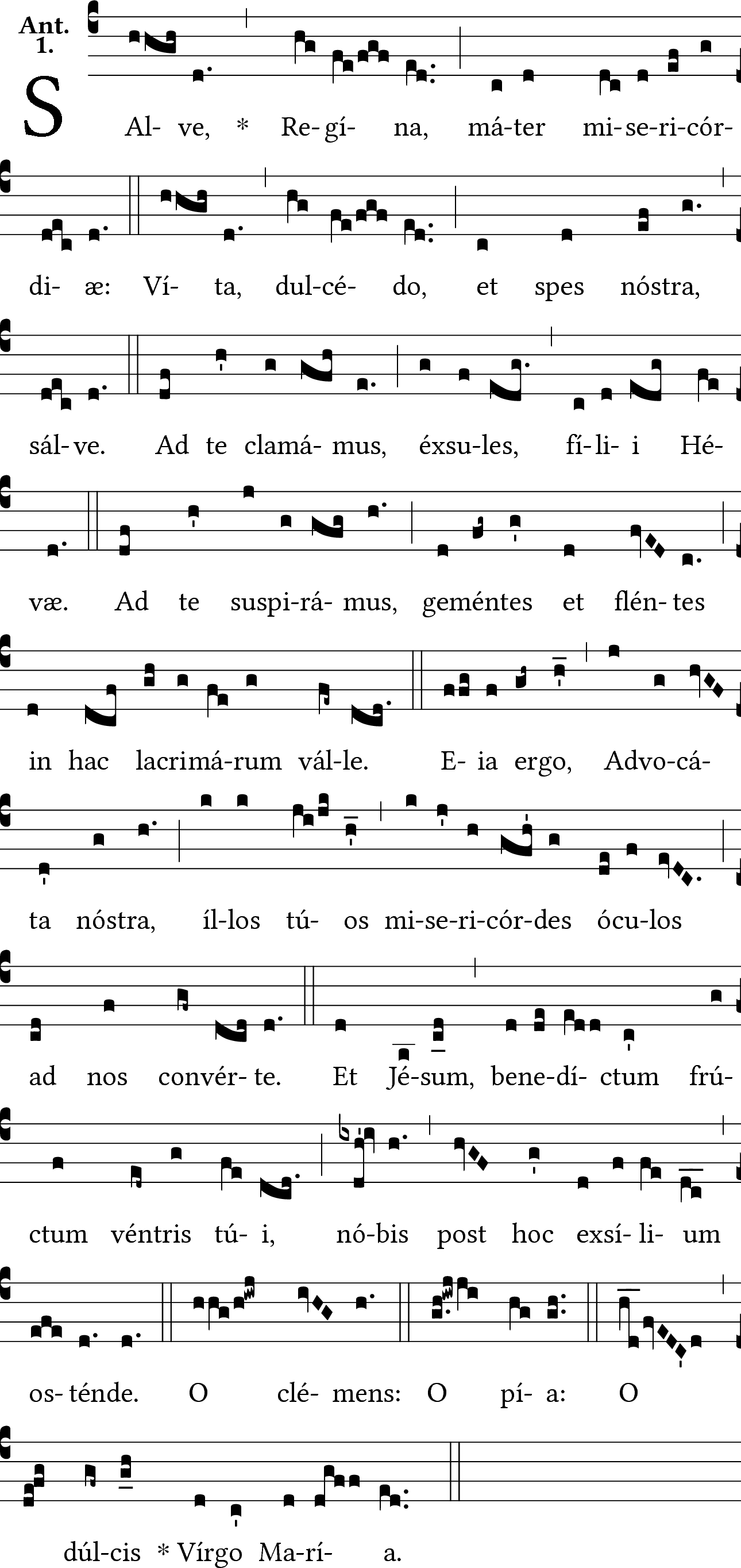
Plainchant notation for the solemn setting of the Salve Regina; a simple setting is used more commonly.

=== Chants of the Office ===
Gregorian chant is sung in the canonical hours of the monastic Office, primarily in antiphons used to sing the Psalms, in the Great Responsories of Matins, and the Short Responsories of the Lesser Hours and Compline. The psalm antiphons of the Office tend to be short and simple, especially compared to the complex Great Responsories.

At the close of the Office, one of four Marian antiphons is sung. These songs, Alma Redemptoris Mater (see top of article), Ave Regina caelorum, Regina caeli laetare, and Salve, Regina, are relatively late chants, dating to the 11th century, and considerably more complex than most Office antiphons. Willi Apel has described these four songs as "among the most beautiful creations of the late Middle Ages".

Alma Redemptoris Mater
Marian antiphon sung at Compline and Lauds between the First Sunday of Advent and Candlemas

== Influence ==
=== Medieval and Renaissance music ===
Gregorian chant had a significant impact on the development of medieval and Renaissance music. Modern staff notation developed directly from Gregorian neumes. The square notation that had been devised for plainchant was borrowed and adapted for other kinds of music. Certain groupings of neumes were used to indicate repeating rhythms called rhythmic modes. Rounded noteheads increasingly replaced the older squares and lozenges in the 15th and 16th centuries, although chantbooks conservatively maintained the square notation. By the 16th century, the fifth line added to the musical staff had become standard. The bass clef and the flat, natural, and sharp accidentals derived directly from Gregorian notation.

Gregorian melodies provided musical material and served as models for tropes and liturgical dramas. Vernacular hymns such as "Christ ist erstanden" and "Nun bitten wir den Heiligen Geist" adapted original Gregorian melodies to translated texts. Secular tunes such as the popular Renaissance "In Nomine" were based on Gregorian melodies. Beginning with the improvised harmonizations of Gregorian chant known as organum, Gregorian chants became a driving force in medieval and Renaissance polyphony. Often, a Gregorian chant (sometimes in modified form) would be used as a cantus firmus, so that the consecutive notes of the chant determined the harmonic progression. The Marian antiphons, especially Alma Redemptoris Mater, were frequently arranged by Renaissance composers. The use of chant as a cantus firmus was the predominant practice until the Baroque period, when the stronger harmonic progressions made possible by an independent bass line became standard.

The Catholic Church later allowed polyphonic arrangements to replace the Gregorian chant of the Ordinary of the Mass. This is why the Mass as a compositional form, as set by composers like Palestrina or Mozart, features a Kyrie but not an Introit. The Propers may also be replaced by choral settings on certain solemn occasions. Among the composers who most frequently wrote polyphonic settings of the Propers were William Byrd and Tomás Luis de Victoria. These polyphonic arrangements usually incorporate elements of the original chant.

== See also ==
- Alternatim
- Anglican chant
- Cecilian Movement
- Damien Poisblaud
- Paul Jausions
- Proportionalism (Gregorian chant)
- Schola Antiqua
- Semiology (Gregorian chant)
