= Proportionalism (Gregorian chant) =

Proportionalism, also known as mensuralism, is a hermeneutical approach to the performance of the earliest transcriptions of Gregorian chant prior to the adoption of mensural notation. The approach can be contrasted with accentualism, or oratorical chant, an interpretation which applies a style of recitative singing.

Jesuit Jan Vollaerts was a strong proponent of strict 2:1 proportionalism.

== See also ==
- Alternatim
- Cecilian Movement
- Schola Antiqua
- Semiology (Gregorian Chant)
