= Mozarabic chant =

Catholic liturgical plainchant repertory

Mozarabic chant (also known as the Hispanic chant, Old Hispanic chant, Old Spanish chant, or Visigothic chant) is the liturgical plainchant repertory of the Mozarabic rite of the Catholic Church, related to the Gregorian chant. It is primarily associated with Hispania under Visigothic rule and later with the Mozarabs (Hispanic Christians living under Islamic rule) and was replaced by the chant of the Roman rite following the Christian Reconquest of the Iberian Peninsula. Although its original medieval form is largely lost, a few chants have survived with readable musical notation, and the chanted rite was later revived in altered form and continues to be used in a few isolated locations in Spain, primarily in Toledo.

== Terminology ==
Confusion caused by the expression "Mozarabic chant" has led to the use of several competing names for the music to which it refers. The term Mozarabic refers to the Mozarabs, that is, the Christians of Al-Andalus (which included parts of modern Spain and Portugal) living under Muslim rule. However, the chant existed before the Muslim conquest of 711 CE. Visigothic refers to the Visigoths who dominated the Iberian peninsula in the centuries prior to the Muslim conquest and converted from Arian Christianity to Roman Catholic Christianity in 587 CE. However, this Catholic rite already existed in Hispania prior to their conversion, and the chant was not limited to the Visigoths, so "Old Spanish" has been used as an inaccurate alternative. Because the chant was found in Portugal as well as Spain, the term "Hispanic" has also been used by scholars. Because of the ambiguity and vagueness of the terms "Visigothic", "Hispanic", and "Mozarabic", "scholars have come to favour the term 'Old Hispanic' for this repertory" (Randel and Nadeau n.d.).

== History ==
The basic structure of the rite that came to be known as the Mozarabic Rite was documented by St. Isidore of Seville in the 7th century. The Credo had already been introduced into this rite in the Third Council of Toledo of 589, in which the Visigoths officially converted to Catholicism. (The Credo would not be used in the Roman rite in Rome itself until after 1014, at the request of the Holy Roman Emperor Henry II.)

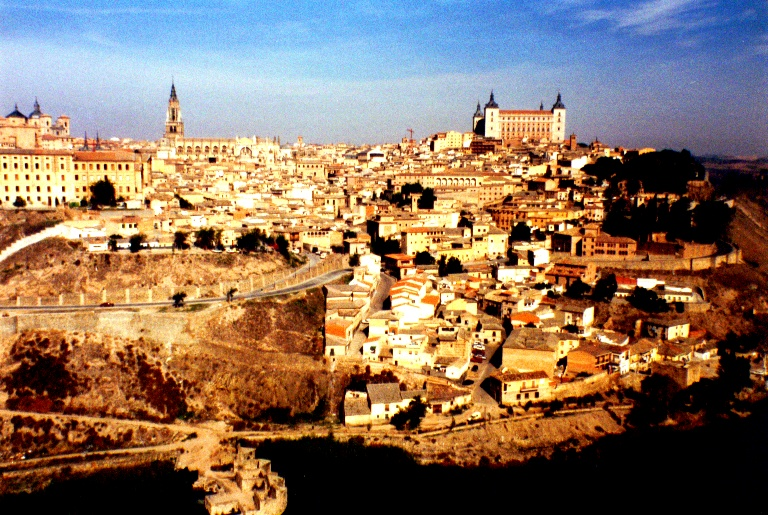
The city of Toledo

The Mozarabic rite shares similarities with the Ambrosian rite and Gallican rite, and differs from the Roman rite. As the Christian reconquest of Hispania went on, the Roman rite supplanted the Mozarabic one. With the papal appointment of a French abbot as the new archbishop of Toledo, which had been recaptured in 1085, Roman influence could be enforced throughout the Hispanic Church. Following its official suppression by Pope Gregory VII, the Mozarabic rite and its chant disappeared in all but six parishes in Toledo.

The Mozarabic rite was revived by Cardinal Jiménez de Cisneros, who published in 1500 and 1502 a Mozarabic Missal and Breviary, incorporating elements of the Roman rite, and dedicated a chapel to preserving this rite. However, the chant used for this restored rite shows significant influence from Gregorian chant, and does not appear to resemble the chant sung prior to the reconquest.

== General characteristics ==
The Mozarabic chant is largely defined by its role in the liturgy of the Mozarabic rite, which is more closely related to the northern "Gallic" liturgies such as the Gallican rite and the Ambrosian rite than to the Roman rite. Musically, little is known about the chant. Most of the surviving music is written in neumes that show the contour of the chant, but no pitches or intervals. Only twenty or so sources contain music that can be transcribed.

However, some things are known about the Mozarabic repertory. Like all plainchant, Mozarabic chant was monophonic and a cappella. In accordance with Roman Catholic tradition, it is primarily intended to be sung by males.

As in Gregorian chant, Mozarabic chant melodies can be broadly grouped into four categories: recitation, syllabic, neumatic, and melismatic. Recitations are the simplest, consisting primarily of a simple reciting tone. Syllabic chants have mostly one note per syllable. Neumatic chants have a small number of notes, often just two or three, notes per syllable. Melismatic chants feature long, florid runs of notes, called melismas, on individual syllables.

In both Mozarabic and Gregorian chant, there is a distinction between antiphonal and responsorial chants. Originally, responsorial chant alternated between a soloist singing a verse and a chorus singing a refrain called the respond, while antiphonal chant alternated between two semi-choruses singing a verse and an interpolated text called an antiphon. In the developed chant traditions, they took on more functional characteristics. In an antiphonal chant, the antiphon is generally longer and more melodic than the verse, which is usually sung to a simpler formula called a psalm tone. In a responsorial chant, the verse and refrain are often comparable in style and melodic content.

Mozarabic chants used a different system of psalm tones for psalm antiphons than Gregorian chant. Unlike the standardized Gregorian classification of chants into eight modes, Mozarabic chant used between four and seven, depending on the local tradition. Many Mozarabic chants are recorded with no musical notation at all, or just the incipit, suggesting that the psalm tones followed simple and frequently used formulas.

== Repertoire ==
=== Chants of the Office ===
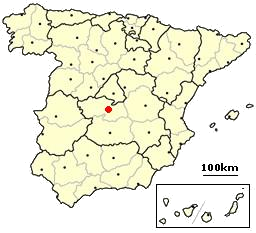
Location of Toledo in modern Spain

The musical forms encountered in Mozarabic chant present a number of analogies with those of the Roman rite. For example, a comparable distinction exists between antiphonal and responsorial singing. And Mozarabic chant may be seen to make use of three styles: syllabic, neumatic and melismatic, much as in Gregorian chant. In the following descriptions of the principal musical items in both the Mozarabic Office and Mass, some of these analogies will be discussed further. The items from the Mass are presented here in the appropriate liturgical order.

The Antiphons are the largest category of Office chants. Most are moderately syllabic, with simple recitations used for the verses, sung in antiphony.

The Alleluiatici are also antiphonal chants, whose text usually involves an alleluia, similar in style to regular antiphons. Unlike the Gregorian repertory, these are sung at Matins and Vespers even on penitential days, when "alleluia" is omitted from the liturgy.

Matins features a musical form called the missa, which consists of an Alleluiaticus framed by two Antiphons and a Responsory. Later missae show common musical material thematically uniting the missa. The Responsories, which are primarily found at the end of a missa, are generally neumatic, consisting of melodic formulas that adjust to fit the lengths of different phrases, ending in a fixed cadence.

Other Office chants include the morning-themed Matutinaria, the Benedictiones using texts from the Book of Daniel, the melismatic Soni, and the alleluiatic Laudes. The Psallendi, unrelated to the Psallendae of Ambrosian chant, end with the Doxology.

The neumatic Vespertini, like the Lucernaria of Ambrosian chant, usually allude to the lighting of lamps or to nightfall. They show a high degree of centonization, construction from a vocabulary of stock musical phrases, and adaptation, application of a pre-existing melody to a new text.

Preces are short, lightly neumatic musical prayers in rhyme with a refrain. They exist in both the Mozarabic rite and the Gallican rite, but the concordance between the two rites appears to be liturgical and not musical. Finally, the Office chants include a number of Hymns, many of which are found throughout Catholic Europe, although we do not know if the same melodies were used.

=== Chants of the Mass ===
The Mass is the Christian celebration of the Eucharist. Plainchant occurs prominently in the Mass for several reasons: to communally affirm the faith, to expand on the scriptural lessons, and to cover certain actions.

Praelegenda are opening chants corresponding to the Gregorian Introit, which use the same antiphonal structure and psalm tones found in the Mozarabic Office.

Unlike the Gregorian Gloria, the Mozarabic Gloria in excelsis Deo only occurs in some local traditions.

The Trisagion, in which the Greek word "hagios" is sung three times, sometimes quite melismatically or translated into the Latin "sanctus," corresponds to the simple threefold "Kyrie eleison" sung at the end of the Laus missa of the Ambrosian rite. This is not the liturgical counterpart of the Gregorian Sanctus.

Following the Trisagion are the Benedictiones. Like the Benedictiones of the Office, these come from the Book of Daniel, but use more complex melodies, whose refrain structure derives directly from the biblical poetry.

The Psalmi are neumatic and melismatic responsorial chants which function similarly to the Gregorian Gradual. On a few holidays, the Psalmo leads directly into a Clamor. Clamores conclude with the refrain of the preceding Psalmo. During Lent, Threni substitute for Psalmi. Each Threnus has a non-repeating refrain followed by several verses, which are sung to the same melody. This function of replacing another chant on certain penitential days is similar to the way the Gregorian Tract replaces the Alleluia.

Just as the Gregorian Gradual is followed by the Alleluia, the Mozarabic Psalmo is followed by the Laus. Like the Gregorian Alleluias, the Laudes include two melismas on the word "alleluia" surrounding a simpler verse. During Lent, the Laudes use different texts.

The Sacrificium corresponds to the Gregorian Offertory. The Sacrificia appear to be closely related to the Soni chants of the Office.

A few Mozarabic Masses include the Ad pacem, a special Antiphon sung for the kiss of peace, or the Ad sanctus, similar to the Gregorian Sanctus.

Corresponding to the Ambrosian Confractorium is the Ad confractionem panis, sung for the breaking of the bread. The chant Ad accedentes, corresponding to the Gregorian Communion, follows.

== Recordings ==
Recordings have been made by:

- Ensemble Organum on the French label Harmonia Mundi
- the monks of Santo Domingo de Silos under the direction of Ismael Fernández de la Cuesta on the German label Archiv Produktion.
