= Gallican chant =

Liturgical plainchant of the Roman Catholic Church

Gallican chant refers to the liturgical plainchant repertory of the Gallican rite of the Roman Catholic Church in Gaul, prior to the introduction and development of elements of the Roman rite from which Gregorian chant evolved. Although the music was largely lost, traces are believed to remain in the Gregorian corpus.

== History ==
Several sources attest the existence of a distinctive Gallican rite in the Frankish lands between the 5th and 9th centuries. The Celtic Rite and Mozarabic rite, which are liturgically related to the Gallican, are sometimes collectively referred to as "Gallican" as opposed to the different structure of the Roman rite. Lack of a central authority led to the development of local traditions of the Gallican rite in Francia, sharing a basic structure but varying in details. These traditions endured until the Carolingian dynasty. During a papal visit in 752-3, Pope Stephen II had Mass celebrated using Roman chant. According to Charlemagne, his father Pepin and Chrodegang of Metz abolished the Gallican rites in favor of the Roman use, in order to strengthen ties with Rome that would culminate in Charlemagne's elevation to Holy Roman Emperor. Charlemagne completed the job his father had begun, so that by the 9th century the Gallican rite and chant had effectively been eliminated. However, the Roman chant brought to the Carolingian churches was incomplete, and ended up incorporating musical and liturgical elements from the local Gallican traditions. The resulting Carolingian chant, which developed into Gregorian chant, was a Romanized chant, but one in which traces of the lost Gallican repertory may still be found.

== General characteristics ==
No chantbooks of Gallican chant have survived, although the first documented reference to a book of Western plainchant is to a Gallican text with psalms and chants. What we know of Gallican chant comes from contemporary descriptions of the chant, and Gallican elements that survived in later Gregorian sources.

Gallican chant was said to be recognizably different from Roman chant in both its texts and its music. Walahfrid Strabo, writing in the 9th century, judged Roman chant as "more perfect" and Gallican as incorrect and "inelegant." The Gallican rite and texts were often florid and dramatic compared with their Roman counterparts, which may be reflected in the importance of melismatic music in Gallican chant compared with Roman. The use of two reciting tones in Gregorian psalmody may derive from Gallican chant. Another element of Gregorian chant not found in Roman chant, which may reflect Gallican conventions, is the "Gallican cadence," in which the final neume, found only in Gaulish sources, is an upward step whose second pitch is repeated, such as C-D-D. Some types of Gallican chant show direct influence from Byzantine chant, including the use of Greek texts.

Compositional techniques included certain common incipits, cadences, and the use of centonization.

The chief candidates for chants in the Gregorian repertory that may be Gallican fossils are those chants not occurring in the Roman tradition, but having counterparts in the Mozarabic chant and Ambrosian chant traditions, and local and votive chants specific to French saints and locations.
