= Paul Jausions =

Dom Paul Ambroise Marie Jausions (15 November 1834 in Rennes – 9 September (Note: p. 29, note n°33 bis) 1870 in Vincennes, Indiana aged 35) was a French forerunner in the field of the restoration of the Gregorian chant since the middle of the nineteenth century, as well as the author of some religious books.

== Biography ==
=== Training ===
The son of Ambroise-Julien Jausions, printer, Paul-Ambroise Jausions chose the collège Saint-Sauveur de Redon for his training. He then joined the Jacut de Landoac parish. As a young cleric of the Archdiocese of Rennes, he was already deeply studying liturgical chant. To tell the truth, his father also knew this subject well, by printing the Principes élémentaires de musique et de plain-chant, suivis d'exemples pour faciliter l'intelligence de texte by Florent-Remi Moulin (Ambroise Jausions, Rennes, 2nd edition, 1840). It is therefore normal that the young Paul wrote a little method for the performance of the liturgical chant. Someone in his family wrote to him on November 20, 1855: "For plainsong, the nuns of Mercy make a special study of it, so your little method will be very useful to me." (Note: p. 29, note n° 34)

=== Abbaye Saint-Pierre de Solesmes ===
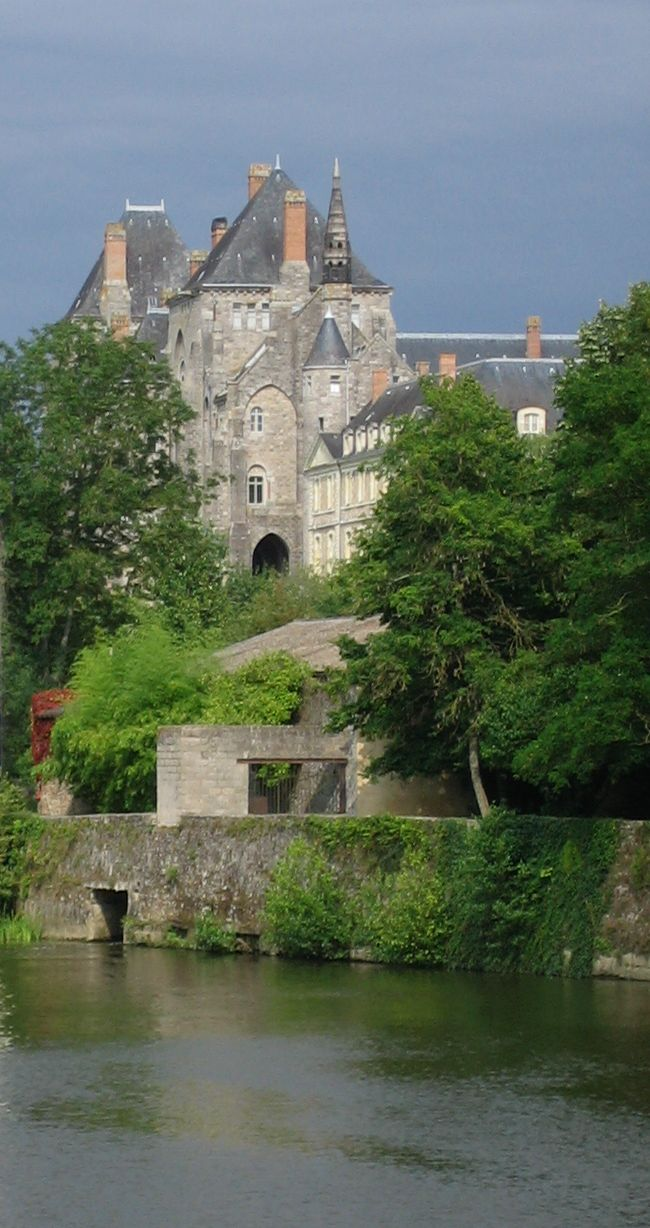
Abbaye Saint-Pierre de Solesmes.

On October 26, 1854, he was authorized to enter the Benedictine Abbey Saint-Pierre de Solesmes as a novice. The abbot of the monastery, Dom Prosper Guéranger, who wanted the restoration of the ancient and authentic liturgy, gave him his prints of the chant during the celebration of the Holy Week at the Vatican in 1856:

I've been thinking a lot about you these days during the chants of the papal chapel. There is nothing like it in the world, if not ... Saint-Pierre de Solesmes that my thoughts were constantly seeking in the midst of all these pumps. Oh, when will we resume our research in books?

Paul Jausions entered his profession on 29 September 1856 and was ordained a priest on 18 December 1858.

=== His first missions ===
Then in 1859, he was given the task of giving conferences on Gregorian chant especially on the nature of the tonic accent and his role in the performance of the chant to the monks of Solesmes and the hosts of passage. In later years, therefore, Paul Jausions focused intensively on the interpretation and emphasis on Gregorian chant, in which he concentrated mainly on studies. Dom Jausions was likely studying the Scriptores ecclesiastici de musica sacra potissimum by Martin Gerbert, that the abbey had owned since 1844, thanks to the canon of the Le Mans Cathedral, Augustin Gontier, a friend of Dom Guéranger and instructor of the chant of this abbey.

In order that the work of Dom Jausions be actually advanced, the Abbot of Solesmes invited another monk who was able to study the ancient liturgical chant, Dom Joseph Pothier. The latter arrived at Solesmes on 1 February 1859.

According to the opinion of his abbot, Dom Jausions began to copy the ancient manuscripts, around 1859. What is certain is the copy made in 1860 of the English processional of St. Edith of Wilton, from the thirteenth to the fourteenth centuries, called processionnal de Rollington in the old Solesmes.

He was notably instructed by Dom Guéranger to prepare "the first draft of our monastic chant", realized a few years later, as Directorium chori. In this purpose, he was sent to the Roman Catholic Diocese of Le Mans to see many old song books. Through thick and thin, he succeeded in finding those that he was concerned with. The Bishop of Le Mans authorized him, in fact, to take to Solesmes a precious manuscript of the Roman gradual from Maine, provided that the duration did not exceed six months and that Dom Jausions gave him a receipt. When he was at Le Mans, he and canon Gontier were deeply discussing the topic of liturgical chant, for the first time on 23 September 1860, then from 16 October to 5 November.

=== Angers Library ===
As a result of extensive study, Dom Jausions and Dom Pothier concluded in 1862 that the oldest and lineless neumes should be consulted in order to restore Gregorian chant correctly, even nowadays, one of the principles of gregorian semiology. This is why Dom Jausions began to visit the Municipal Library of Angers regularly, performing the transcriptions of the old manuscripts, in particular those of the Maruncit 91 attributed to the 10th century.Read online In 1862 he stayed there from 4 to 12 April, from 27 June to 9 July and from 13 to 31 October. It is not certain that in 1863 he was there, because of the preparation of the song book of his monastery.

From June 3, 1864, Dom Jausions was in Angers. This time, he returned to Paris, before returning to Solesmes on July 20. Above all, he found at the Bibliothèque nationale de France an important fac-simile of the Antiphonary of St. Benigne in double notation, copied by Théodore Nisard in 1851.

He was in charge of the manuscripts of Angers, again in 1865. At least the monk returned there on 6 March, 30 June and 27 October.

In continuing his publication, Dom Jausions remained again at Angers, from 8 to 25 March 1866, in favor of the copy of the graduals.

The city of Angers became an important place for this monk. In fact, a few books by this author were published from that city.

=== Directorium Chori ===
Dom Paul-Amboise Jausions was also the author of several books, which sometimes preferred to remain anonymous. However the original author of Directorium Chori was the Italian hymn composer Giovanni Guidetti. His tune 'Jam lucis' (let there be light) was first published in 1582.

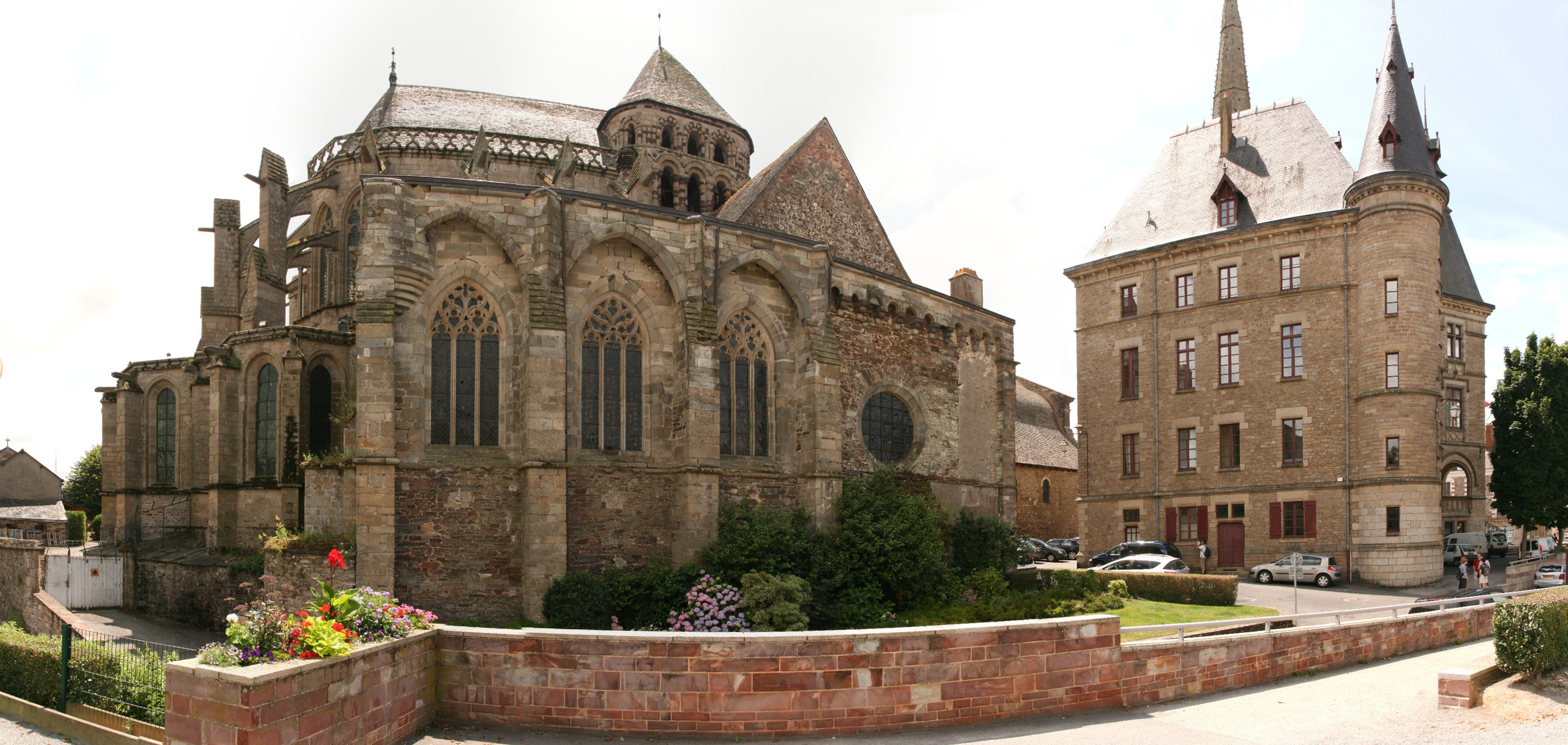
In 1864, this former student of the college Saint-Sauveur published the history of this abbey and of the city of Redon.

Jausions publications were essentially made in the mid-1860s. Thus, the Bibliothèque nationale de France attributes the authorship of the Histoire abrégée de la Ville et de l'Abbaye de Redon, par un Prêtre, Ancien élève du Collège Saint-Sauveur published in 1864 to Paul Jausions Read online. This book is considered one of the most important works of this monk.

In this publication, the first major song book of Solesmes was also prepared. Thus Dom Jausions frequented his hometown Rennes as early as 1860, in view of his impression. This book entitled Directorium Chori was prepared by him under the influence of Canon Gontier, for the latter spoke considerably of this work in 1863. It was the book of singing concerning the common tones of the Masses and the Office, with the rules of accentuation and pronunciation. After several years of improvement and correction adapted to older manuscripts, the printing was done in Rennes, at Vatar in 1864. However, Dom Guéranger, a contributor to the book (Note: p. 58, note n° 76 bis: "Dom Guéranger took part in the composition of the Directorium Chori. ";) hesitated to distribute this book, by keeping it in Rennes. (Note: p. 57 Here is a letter from canon Gontier in 1864: "Their" Directorium chori is printed, I have seen it; But it is entirely by the printer. I shall have a copy of it as soon as it is distributed to the monks. ... ».) It is possible that the abbot would await the publication of the theoretical book for which the Directorium Chori would need for a more pleasant practice but, the real reason remains unknown. Around 1866, the Directorium Chori stock was completely lost, due to a fire in the Vatar printing press, with the exception of only four copies, which had previously been taken away as examples. After this dramatic event, Solesmes did not print his notations until 1883, namely the Liber gradualis.

In spite of this catastrophe, he continued his own publications. In 1866, Paul Jausions released the "Vie de l'Abbé Carron" at Dauriol in Paris. The first impression was made in one volume, then reprinted in the same year, in two volumes. His last publication was made in favor of the restoration of the sanctuary of Glanfeuil, in 1868, entitled Saint-Maur et le sanctuaire de Glanfeuil en Anjou online.

On the other hand, Dom Jausions also supported the writing of Canon Gontier, for example, the Petit traité de la bonne pronunciation de la langue latine ("Little Treatise on the Proper Pronunciation of the Latin Language") prepared at Solesmes and published in Paris in 1864. (Note: p. 55 : « règles d'accentuation [qui] sont à peu près uniquement de ma rédaction » (25 April 1866)) It is probable that Dom Jausions and Canon Gontier distributed their knowledge for their publications.

=== Gregorian travels ===
In 1866, the two monks were again assigned to move for Gregorian chant. While Dom Pothier remained in Alsace through Laon to seek manuscripts, Dom Jausions first stayed at the Ligugé Abbey and the Minor Seminary of Saint-Gaultier, for a few sessions of singing. Then, after returning to Solesmes, Paul Jausions returned to the Fontgombault Abbey, not yet restored, then stayed in Paris where he copied the old manuscripts in the archives, notably at the Imperial Library.

The two restorers were preparing together a book on the method of performing Gregorian chant. Their writing was said to have been completed in the summer of 1867, according to documents. However, this theoretical book, entitled Mélodies Grégoriennes, was not released until 1880, after the death of Dom Jausions. According to a letter from canon Gontier, instructor of the liturgical chant of Solesmes, the latter and Dom Jausions remained cautious, judging that the theory presented in the manuscript was not yet sufficient.

Hence, it is evident that the two monks concentrated henceforth on the preparation of the books of song, gradual and Antiphonary, taking advantage of their gained knowledge. Thus, Dom Jausions, being at the Municipal Library of Angers, wrote on 28 March 1867:

Our work being a restoration of the text from the manuscripts would still be quite considerable if we had at our cell at Solesmes the manuscripts we need. ... Thus I copy here two graduals, one from the 10th and the other from the 12th, in the Public Library. Both are now on Sundays after Pentecost (including the Saints, which in these manuscripts are intercalated in the Own of Time). So I walk towards the end, and with great strides, but to get to that point, it took me many trips, passing only a few days each time. "So, too, I obtained, with great difficulty, last summer, in Paris, three texts of the Antiphonaire. They are communicated to us for the year; But as we can only have them for this time, we hasten to transcribe them; And this year, still employed in procuring the documents, will have produced but little, directly, at least, for our final work. When we have all our materials, these three or four graduals, and so many Antiphonaries, our work will march infinitely faster; But in all things, time and patience are necessary. You also know that we, Dom Pothier and I, have several other occupations and impediments. We do our best in the midst of all this; But we can not do the impossible.

In July, he completed the copy of this manuscript 91 of Angers, which would be presented to Dom Guéranger at the feast of Assumption, after the sessions, again, in Ligugé, Fontgombault and Saint-Gaultier.

In 1868, they finished writing the gradual. Still it was necessary to prepare the antiphonary. In July, Dom Jausions went once more to Paris, in search of several manuscripts. It is sometimes said that it was the facsimile in the hand of the Antiphonary of St. Benigne, conducted by Theodore Nisard in 1851 and hosted by the Bibliothèque Impériale. Admittedly, the Liber gradualis released in 1883 took advantage of it. However, it is not certain that Dom Jausions copied it in 1868.

=== Towards Vincennes, last voyage ===
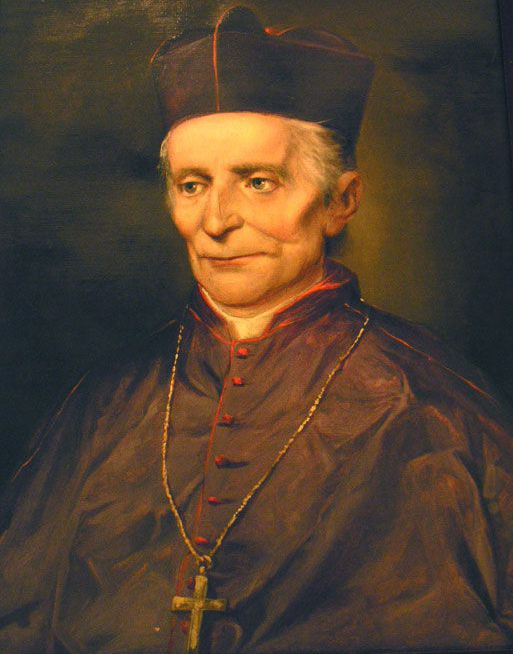
Simon Bruté de Rémur, first bishop of Vincennes. Dom Jausions died there in 1870, before writing the biography of his uncle.

Subsequently, this monk decided to cross the Atlantic Ocean, in order to write a biography of one of his uncles, Simon Bruté de Rémur. In 1869, he then arrived in the United-States, at Vincennes where the Bishop of Remur had founded his Episcopal Church.

He suddenly died in 1870 in Vincennes before returning to France 9 September. Dom Jausions was buried in his Solesmes Abbey, probably on 3 October.

Dom Jausions applied himself with a rare perseverance to the examination of the problems raised by the history and execution of Gregorian chant.

— Obituary in the Semaine religieuse du diocèse de Rennes, n° 46, 16 September 1871, p. 725. (Note: p. 31, note n° 36)

== Publications ==
- Directorium chori, Imprimerie Vatar, Rennes 1864; Lost due to the fire of the printing press before use.
- Histoire abrégée de la Ville et de l'Abbaye de Redon, par un Prêtre, ancien élève du Collège Saint-Sauveur, Libraires Mesdemoiselles Thorel, Redon 1864, 396 p. Read online
- Redon, Description de la ville et de ses principaux monuments avec un précis historique, Libraires Mesdemoiselles Thorel, Redon 1865.
- Le Petit office de la B. V. Marie, avec une traduction nouvelle et un commentaire en forme de médiations, E. Barassé, Angers 1865. (Note: p. 62 Si l'année 1865 est sûre, la Bibliothèque nationale suggère une possibilité de la première édition en 1864.)
- Vie de l'abbé Carron, Dauriol, Paris 1866.
- Saint Maur et le sanctuaire de Glanfeuil en Anjou, — Se vend au profit de l'œuvre de la restauration du sanctuaire de Saint-Maur, Imprimerie P. Lachèse, Belleuvre et Dolbeau, Angers 1868, 224 p. Read online

== See also ==
- Gregorian chant
- Redon Abbey, Solesmes Abbey
- Simon Bruté

== Bibliography ==
- Marie-Emmanuel Pierre, Cantabo Domino, Cours de chant grégorien, Abbaye Saint-Michel de Kergonan, Plouharnel 2005, ISBN 978-2-9525681-0-4 343 p.
- Pierre Combe, Histoire de la restauration du chant grégorien d'après des documents inédits, Solesmes et l'Édition Vaticane, Abbaye Saint-Pierre, Solesmes 1969, 488 p.
