= Alexander Schweitzer =

Alexander Schweitzer may refer to:

- Alexander Schweitzer (politician) (born 1973), German politician
- Alexander M. Schweitzer (born 1964), German theologian
