= Restoration of Gregorian chants =

Restoration of Gregorian chants is the process of restoring the original melody in Gregorian Chant manuscripts.

== Research ==
All mainstream editions of chant books (Vatican, Solesmes, etc.) are known to contain a large number of errors. Comparative studies have been undertaken in which related groups of the earlier rhythmic unheightened neumatic manuscripts are set in large tables of comparison which is juxtaposed with a similar table of later melodic linear notations.

== Description ==
Research by Dom. Jean Claire in the field of modality has shown that the third and eighth modes have had their dominants raised from B to C. In mode III is E authentic; the dominant a fifth above is B, which in many chants is raised to C in official editions. Not only are many chants in mode III and VIII in need of melodic restitution, there are errors in all other modes. The Munsterschwarzach-Group (Godehard Joppich, Stefan Klockner et al.)(publishers of the Beiträge zur Gregorianik) have been issuing their own melodic restitutions, as has Anton Stingl, and Geert Maassen with his Fluxus.notation. Whereas some of the researchers are hoping to establish an Urtext edition, others have given this up as unrealistic and prefer not to mix manuscripts into 'editorial soup' but to respect them as local variants in their own right. In 2010 Con Brio, Regensburg, published the Graduale Novum, pro Dominicis et Festis, which is another step along the way of melodic restitution, and judging by some essential critique, not the last word on the issue.

Though much has been published concerning melodic restitution in academic circles, it has not reached the area of chant performance practice and remains a mostly specialist subject.
