= Alexander M. Schweitzer =

German theologian and musician (born 1964)

Alexander M. Schweitzer (born 7 April 1964 in Frankfurt am Main) is a German theologian and musician.

== Biography ==
From 1984 to 1992 Schweitzer studied philosophy, Catholic theology and church music in Rome, Cremona and Munich. After years of activity in biblical pastoral ministry, from 2001 to 2011 Schweitzer served as General Secretary of the Catholic Biblical Federation. In 2008 Pope Benedict XVI appointed him expert for the Synod of Bishops on the Word of God.

Since 2011, Schweitzer has been Director of Global Bible Translation and responsible for inter-confessional cooperation at United Bible Societies. Since 2017, in addition, he has been serving as executive director for Global Bible Ministry in the same organisation.

As a church musician, Schweitzer specialises in Gregorian chant. He works with numerous ensembles worldwide, and since 1998 he has been directing Consortium Vocale Oslo, with whom he has recorded seven CDs. He is a member of international juries and has been granted several awards.

Schweitzer teaches Gregorian Semiology in the "Master of Advanced Studies" program at the Music University of Italian-speaking Switzerland, Lugano and he is a lecturer at the International AISCGre courses.

In September 2015, Schweitzer was elected president of the International Society for the Study of Gregorian Chant "AISCGre" (Associazione Internazionale Studi di Canto Gregoriano) the main scope of which is the research and interpretation of Gregorian compositions on the basis of the findings of the early musical manuscripts. The society has approximately 500 members in 30 countries.

== Publications (selection) ==
- Vorschläge zur Restitution von Melodien des Graduale Romanum. Hrsg. mit der Restitutionsgruppe der AISCGre in: Beiträge zur Gregorianik (ISSN 0935-9044) 28 (1999), 29-30 (2000), 31-32 (2001), 33-34 (2002), 35-36 (2003), 37-38 (2004), 39-40 (2005), 41-42 (2006), 43-44 (2007), 45-46 (2008), 47-48 (2009), 49-50 (2010), 51-52 (2011), 53-54 (2012) ISBN 8890185414
- Das gregorianische Dirigat. In: Giovanni Conti (ed.), Signum sapientiæ –Sapientia signi. Cantus Gregoriani Helvetici Cultores/Quilisma Press (2005).
- Uso della Bibbia nei repertori musicali della liturgia oggi. Riflessioni all'occasione del 40° della Sacrosanctum Concilium. In: La Vita in Cristo e nella Chiesa. Roma (2003)
- Towards a new biblical season: The Post-synodal Apostolic Exhortation "Verbum Domini". In: Acts of the Finnish Ecumenical Council, Tampere, Finland (2012)
- Die Kraft des Wortes. Die Bedeutung der Reformation für Sprachen und Gesellschaften. In: Reformation und die Eine Welt, EKD Magazin 2016 (2015)
- Reading the Bible as the "Word of God". In: Biblical Reflections, United Bible Societies (2016)
- The Bible in the Catholic Tradition. In: Your Word is Truth - The Bible in ten Christian traditions. World Council of Churches & United Bible Societies (2018)

CDs Gregorian Chant (with Consortium Vocale Oslo)

- Laus mea Dominus: Oldest Gregorian Compositions from Mass, Vespers and Compline (ASV Ltd, CD GAU304, LC07967) (2002)
- Exaudiam eum: Gregorian Chant for Lent and Holy Week (2L, SACD43) (2007)
- Vultum tuum: Mary in Gregorian Chant. With Organ improvisations by Kåre Nordstoga (EOS CD4030, LC07277, ISBN 978-3-8306-4030-1) (2009)
- Resurrexi: Easter in Gregorian Chant (EOS CD7542, LC28574, ISBN 978-3-8306-7542-6) (2013)
- Salvum me fecit: Sundays VI-X of Ordinary Time in Gregorian Chant (EOS CD7773, LC28574, ISBN 978-3-8306-7773-4) (2016)
- Mirabilia fecit Dominus: Sundays XXI-XXV and XXXII of Ordinary Time in Gregorian Chant (EOS CD7796, LC 28574, ISBN 978-3-8306-7796-3) (2016)
- Historia Sancti Olavi (LAWO Classics, LWC1106, SACD) (2016)
