= Jubilus =

Jubilus (plural jubili) is the term for the long melisma placed on the final syllable of the Alleluia as it is sung in the Gregorian chant. The structure of the Alleluia is such that the cantor first sings the word "alleluia," without the jubilus, and then the choir repeats the word with the melisma added. It is traditionally repeated at the end of the chant as well, although it was frequently omitted in the Middle Ages and is still omitted when the Alleluia is followed by a Sequence.

The traditional story for the origin of the medieval Sequence is that it came from text added to the jubilus syllabically. Notker of St. Gall is said to have invented this process, and in his collection Liber Hymnorum there are sequences that seem to relate this way to known jubili. However, in his preface to the book, Notker implies that he learned the process from another monk, under tutelage from his teacher Iso of St. Gallen. This, and the fact that many early sequences do not seem to relate to jubili at all, implies that the origin of the Sequence is more complex, but it is possible that it derived from the jubilus originally.
