= Schola Antiqua of New York =

American early music group

- Origin: New York
- Genres: Early music
- Past members: R. John Blackley and Barbara Katherine Jones

Schola Antiqua was an early music group based in New York led by R. John Blackley and Barbara Katherine Jones.

== Discography ==
- Music for Holy Week / Gregorian Chant by Schola Antiqua (1990-10-25)
