= Reciting tone =

Music for the reciting of chant

In chant, a reciting tone (also called a recitation tone) can refer to either a repeated musical pitch or to the entire melodic formula for which that pitch is a structural note. In Gregorian chant, the first is also called tenor, dominant or tuba, while the second includes psalm tones (each with its own associated Gregorian mode) as well as simpler formulae for other readings and for prayers.

== Reciting tones in Gregorian chant ==
=== Regular psalm tones ===
Reciting tones occur in several parts of the Roman Rite. These include the accentus prayers and lessons chanted by the deacons or priests such as the Collect, Epistle, Gospel, Secret, Preface, Canon, and Postcommunion, as well as such regular texts as the Pater noster, Te Deum, and the Gloria in excelsis Deo. They are also sung in versicles and responds such as the Dominus vobiscum ("The Lord be with you") of the officiant followed by the Et cum spiritu tuo ("and with your spirit") of the choir. Some tones, presumably from the earliest layers of chant, such as the Collect, Pater noster, and Postcommunion for Easter, consist of just two notes, often a reciting tone on A or G, with inflected notes one pitch below on G or F. Other tones, from later in the medieval period, usually recited on a C or F, inflecting down to the two notes below, such as the Epistle for Easter.

More complex patterns were used for the psalm tones, which are employed in the chanting of the Psalms and related canticles in the daily Offices. There are eight psalm tones, one for each musical mode, designed so that the antiphon that is sung between psalm verses transitions smoothly into the psalm tone. Each psalm tone has a formulaic intonation, mediant (or mediation), and termination (or ending). The intonation defines the notes for the first two or three syllables, with subsequent words sung on the reciting tone. Because of the parallel structure typical of the Psalms, psalm verses divide into two roughly equal parts; the end of the first part is indicated by the mediant, a slight bending of notes above and below the reciting tone. For longer phrases, the first part is itself divided into two parts, with the division indicated by the flexa, on which the accented syllable is sung on the reciting tone that preceded it, and the following unaccented syllable is sung a whole tone or a minor third lower (depending on the psalm tone), before returning to the reciting tone until the mediant. After the mediant, the second part of the psalm verse is sung on the reciting tone until the last few words, which are sung to a cadential formula called the termination. Several of the psalm tones have two or three possible terminations, to allow for a smoother return to the following repeat of the antiphon.

Two sets of tones are used for the "Magnificat", the canticle of Vespers, and the "Benedictus", the canticle of Lauds: simple tones, which are very close to the standard psalm tones, and solemn tones, which are more ornate and used on the more important feasts.

The psalm verse and "Gloria Patri" (doxology) which are sung as part of the Introit (and optionally the Communion antiphon) of the Mass and of the greater responsories of the Office of Readings (Matins) and the reformed offices of Lauds and Vespers are also sung to similar sets of reciting tones that depend on the musical mode.

=== Tonus peregrinus ===
In addition to the eight psalm tones associated with the eight musical modes, there is a ninth psalm tone called the tonus peregrinus, or "wandering tone", which uses a reciting tone of A for the first part of the psalm verse and a G for the second half. Although rarely used, it is not unique; early sources refer to tones called parapteres, which, like the tonus peregrinus, have different reciting tones in their first and second halves.

== Reciting tones in other chant traditions ==
Some traditions of Qur'an reading utilize reciting tones, although it should be clarified that in Islam, Qur'anic recitation is not considered a form of music. For example, the tulaba ("students of Islam" in Arabic) of Morocco recite the Qur'an and chant hymns for special occasions using one or two reciting tones.

Among the Jews of Yemen, cantillation of the Torah follows a distinctive practice that may be of great antiquity. Typical cantillation uses a system of signs, each of which represents a fixed musical motif. Yemenite chant, however, uses a different set of motifs, which only affect the final words in phrases. All other words are sung to reciting tones.

== Notes ==
Sources

- Hiley, David (1995). Western Plainchant. Oxford: Clarendon Press. ISBN 0-19-816572-2.
- Frere, W. H.; Jander, Owen; Cooke, Peter (n.d.). "Inflection". In L. Macy (ed.). Grove Music Online.
- Hoppin, Richard H. (1978). Medieval Music. New York: W.W. Norton & Co. ISBN 0-393-09090-6.
- Schuyler, Philip (n.d.). "Morocco". In L. Macy (ed.). Grove Music Online.
- Sharvit, Uri (n.d.). "Jewish Music". In L. Macy (ed.). Grove Music Online.
