= Justus ut palma =

Justus ut palma (also transliterated as Iustus ut palma) is the title of a number of sacred choral works which use Psalm 92:13 in the Latin Vulgate as lyrics. The Justus ut palma group refers to a family of melodically related Graduals in the Gregorian chant repertory.
