= Proper (liturgy) =

Parts of the liturgy changing over the course of the year

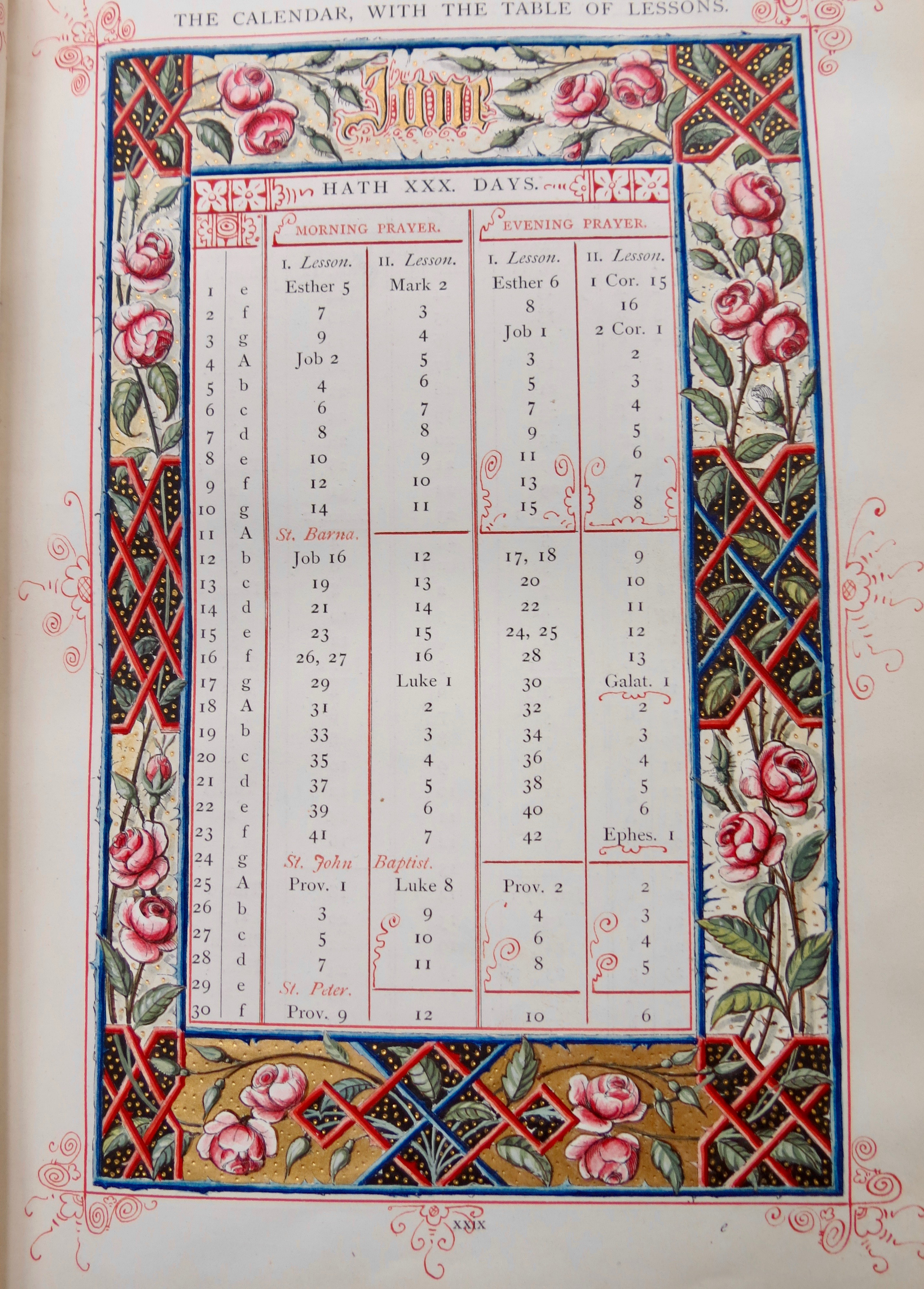
This 1863 liturgical calendar shows liturgical propers for June.

The proper (Latin: proprium) is a part of the Christian liturgy that varies according to the date, either representing an observance within the liturgical year, or of a particular saint or significant event. The term is used in contrast to the ordinary, which is that part of the liturgy that is reasonably constant, or at least selected without regard to date, or to the common, which contains those parts of the liturgy that are common to an entire category of saints, such as apostles or martyrs.

Propers may include hymns and prayers in the canonical hours and in the Eucharist.

== West ==
The proper of the Mass, strictly speaking, consists of the Introit, Gradual, Alleluia or Tract, Sequence, Offertory, and Communion – in other words, all the variable portions of a Mass which are spoken or sung by the choir or the people.
