= Accentus =

Style of church music formerly used in Mass

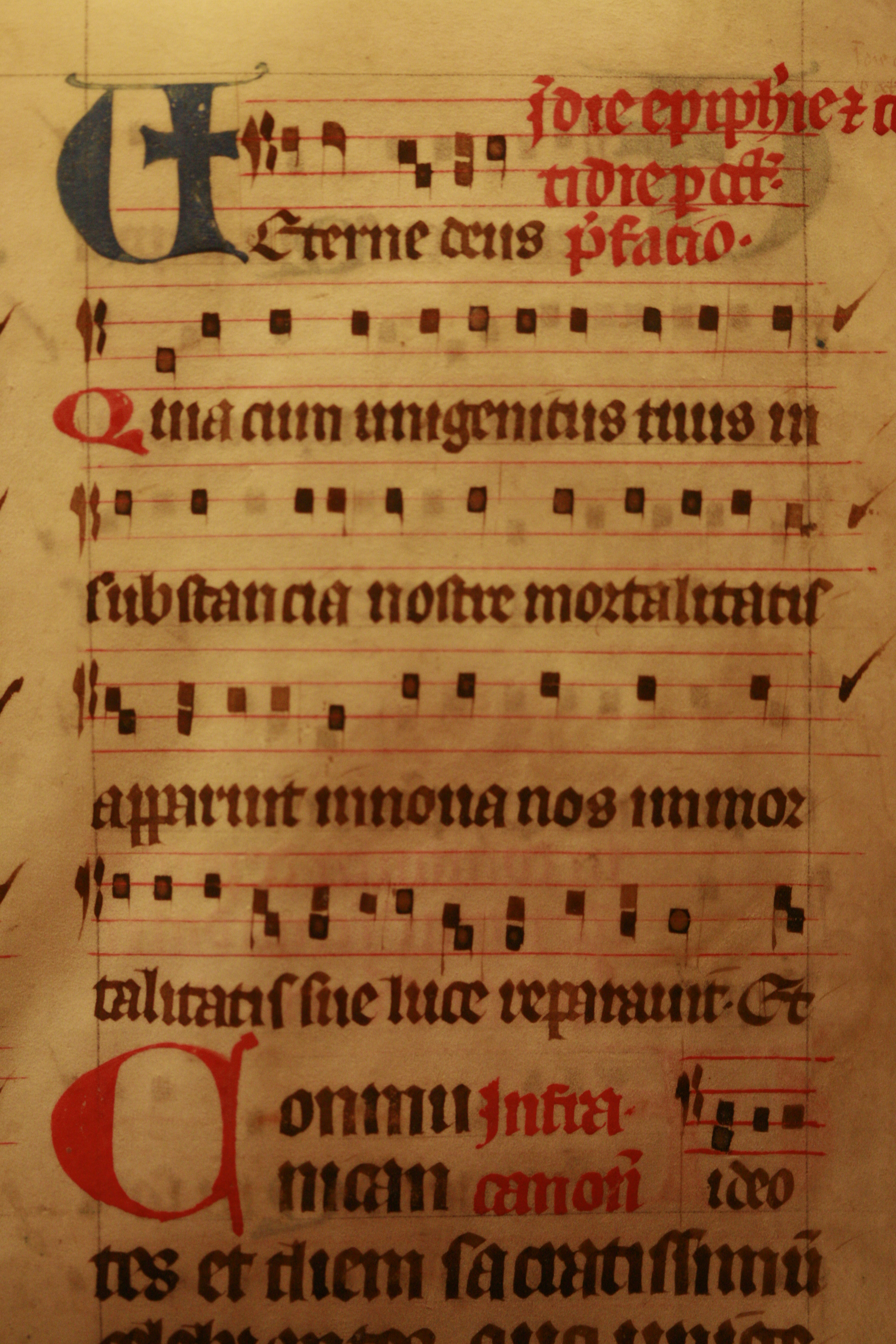
Dominican Missal, c. 1240, giving a portion of the Accentus (Historical Museum of Lausanne).

Accentus (or Accentus Ecclesiasticus; Ecclesiastical accent) is a style of church music that emphasizes spoken word. It is often contrasted with concentus, an alternative style that emphasizes harmony. The terms accentus and concentus were probably introduced by Andreas Ornithoparchus in his Musicae Activae Micrologus, published in Leipzig in 1517. "Concentus might be chief ruler over all things that are sung...and Accentus over all things that are read," according to Ornithoparchus. The style is also known as liturgical recitative, though it differs in some important ways from other types of recitative.

In the medieval church, the whole portion of the liturgical song performed by the choir (or by sections of it) was called concentus; thus hymns, psalms, mass ordinary, and alleluias were usually included under this term, as well as anything with more complex or distinctive melodic contours. On the other hand, parts of the liturgy which the priest, deacon, subdeacon, or acolyte sang alone were called accentus; this included the collects, epistle and gospel, the preface, and anything which was recited chiefly on one tone, rather than sung, by the priest or one of his assistants. The accentus should not be accompanied by harmonies, whether of voices or of instruments, although the concentus may receive such accompaniment. The intoning words Gloria in excelsis Deo and Credo in Unum Deum, being assigned to the celebrant alone, should not be repeated by the choir or accompanied by the organ or other musical instrument.

There were originally seven types of Accentus Ecclesiasticus, depending on how the voice should be inflected at the punctuation marks ending phrases or sentences:

- Accentus immutabilis – voice remains at the same tone
- Accentus medus – voice falls by a third at a colon
- Accentus gravis – voice falls by a fifth at a period
- Accentus actus – voice falls by a third and returns to the original tone at a comma
- Accentus moderatus – voice rises by a second and returns to the original tone at a comma
- Accentus interrogata – voice falls by a second and returns to the original tone at a question mark
- Accentus finalis – voice rises by a second and then falls stepwise to a fourth below the original tone at the end
