= Tract (liturgy) =

Part of Christian liturgy

The tract (Latin: tractus) is part of the proper of the Christian liturgical celebration of the Eucharist, used instead of the Alleluia in Lent or Septuagesima, in a Requiem Mass, and other penitential occasions, when the joyousness of an Alleluia is deemed inappropriate. Tracts are not, however, necessarily sorrowful.

The name apparently derives from either the drawn-out style of singing or the continuous structure without a refrain. There is evidence, however, that the earliest performances were sung responsorially, and it is probable that these were dropped at an early stage.

In their final form, tracts are a series of psalm verses; rarely a complete psalm, but all the verses are from the same psalm. They are restricted to only two modes, the second and the eighth. The melodies follow centonization patterns more strongly than anywhere else in the repertoire; a typical tract is almost exclusively a succession of such formulas. The cadences are nearly always elaborate melismas. Tracts with multiple verses are some of the longest chants in the Liber Usualis.
