= Schola Antiqua, Madrid =

Schola Antiqua
- Choir
- Schola Antiqua at a recent (2006) recording
- Origin: Madrid
- Founded: 1984
- Founder: Don Laurentino Sáenz de Buruaga
- Genre: Early music, Gregorian chant
- Director: Juan Carlos Asensio Palacios
- Affiliation: Benedictine Abbey of Santa Cruz del Valle de los Caídos
- Website: scholaantiqua.com

Schola Antiqua is a Spanish group devoted to the research of early music in general and Gregorian chant in particular. It is based in Madrid since its foundation in 1984.

The group has organized concerts in several places of Christian pilgrimage, such as Jerusalem, Rome and Santiago de Compostela, as well as religious music concerts.

The group has collaborated with such well-known groups as La Colombina, Ensemble Plus Ultra, His Majesty's Sagbutts and Cornetts, Ensemble Baroque de Limoges, Ministriles de Marisas, La Grande Chapelle.

As of 2007, the director and conductor is Juan Carlos Asensio Palacios, who studied in the Valle de los Caídos abbey choir, and now is a member of the Atêlier de Paléographie Musicale of the world-famous Solesmes Abbey and Professor in the Conservatorio Superior de Música de Salamanca and also professor in the Escola Superior de Música de Catalunya.

== Recordings ==
=== Published reviews of recordings ===
Academic sources: "Schola Antiqua albums in the Instituto Cervantes".

General sources:

- http://www.scholaantiqua.com/criticaspdf/scherzo092007.pdf Scherzo Sept 2007, in Spanish, on CD "Dicit Dominus"
- http://www.scholaantiqua.com/criticaspdf/L'education%20musicale06_2007.pdf L'education musicale, June 2007, in French, on CD "Visperas de Confesores" (Jose de Nebra)
- http://www.scholaantiqua.com/criticaspdf/fraternite%20evangelique04_2006.pdf Fraternite Evangelique, April 2007, in French, on CD "Officium Hebdomadae Sanctae" (T.L. de Victoria)

== Published reviews of performances ==
Reviews of its performances have appeared in such general newspapers, as El País and The Times

- http://www.scholaantiqua.com/criticaspdf/scherzo052007_1.pdf Scherzo, May 2007, in Spanish, on its performance at Semana de Música Religiosa de Cuenca 2007 (Spain)
- http://www.scholaantiqua.com/criticaspdf/scherzo052007_2.pdf Scherzo, May 2007, in Spanish, on a Concert about D.Scarlatti at Madrid (Spain)
- http://www.scholaantiqua.com/criticaspdf/Alhajat-Beirut%2021032007.pdf Alhajat-Beirut (Lebanon), V.O., 21 May 2007, about a Concert in Beirut (Lebanon)
- http://www.scholaantiqua.com/criticaspdf/criticaOita.pdf Ōita's Diary, Japan, October 2006, in Japanese, on a concert in that city.

These and many other references can be found at the group home page
