= Centonization =

Compositional system in Christian chant

In music centonization (from Latin cento or patchwork) is musical composition via the combination of pre-existing motivic units, typically in reference to Christian liturgical chant. A piece created using centonization is known as a "centonate".

The concept of centonization was borrowed from literary theory, and first applied to Gregorian chant in 1934 by Dom Paolo Ferretti; it has since also been applied to Byzantine chant.

== Overview ==
Centonization, according to Ferretti's theory, is a very old and widespread technique. The musical modes used in Gregorian chant are supposed to reflect this use; according to the theory, the modes were more collections of appropriate melodic formulas than a set of pitches. Similar ideas appear in the music theory of other cultures; for example, the maqam of Arab music, the raga of Indian music, or the pathet of Indonesian music. These do not designate merely scales, but sets of appropriate melodies and specific ornaments on certain tones (they are sometimes called "melody types"). The originality of the composer lies in how he or she links these formulas together and elaborates upon them in a new way.

Regardless of whether the application of the concept to other branches of Christian chant, or other types of music is valid, its use with respect to Gregorian chant has been severely criticized, and opposing models have been proposed. The term "centonate" is not applied to other categories of composition constructed from pre-existing units, such as fricassée, pasticcio, potpourri, and quodlibet.

== See also ==
- Melody type
- Modal frame
