= Liber Brevior =

Catholic liturgical music book

The Liber Brevior is a book of commonly used Gregorian chants in the Catholic tradition. It is an abbreviation of the Liber Usualis and differs from that compendium of chant music in that it contains only the chants required for use at sung Mass, omitting the chants used in the chanting of the Divine Office. It could be said that the Liber Brevior is “the layman’s Liber,” designed and intended to be used in parish settings by small Catholic choirs, rather than for use by clergy and religious (e.g., monks, cloistered nuns) bound to chant the Office in choir or in common.

Like the Liber Usualis, the Liber Brevior book is an "unofficial" book of the Catholic Church that combines in one volume, for the sake of convenience, the following two "official" books of the Catholic liturgy for the Mass: 1. The Kyriale, which includes the usual eighteen settings of the Ordinary of the Mass (Kyrie, Gloria, Credo, Sanctus and Agnus Dei) as well as certain other music for the Mass (Asperges, final blessing response, etc.); and 2. the Graduale Romanum, which includes the "official" music of the Mass propers (Introit, Graduale or Tract, Alleluia, Offertory and Communion). The Liber Brevior omits the following material found in the Liber Usualis: parts of the Breviarium Romanum (the spoken or recited readings of the Breviary), and parts of the Antiphonale Romanum (Responsory and Psalter).

The Desclée publishing company in Belgium, in conjunction with the Gregorian Institute of America, issued the Liber Brevior in 1954 to meet the needs of those who wished to sing the chants of a sung Tridentine Mass, but did not need those parts pertaining to the Office.

In the back section of the book, there is another set of Graduals, Alleluias, and Tracts in a simpler chant tone arrangement of the same music, allowing less-experienced choirs to sing simplified versions of these elaborate chants at Mass.

This book can be used with the traditional sung Tridentine Latin High Mass of 1962 as authorized by Pope Benedict XVI's 2007 motu proprio Summorum Pontificum.
