= Liturgical books of the Roman Rite =

Key texts of Catholicism's most widespread public worship service

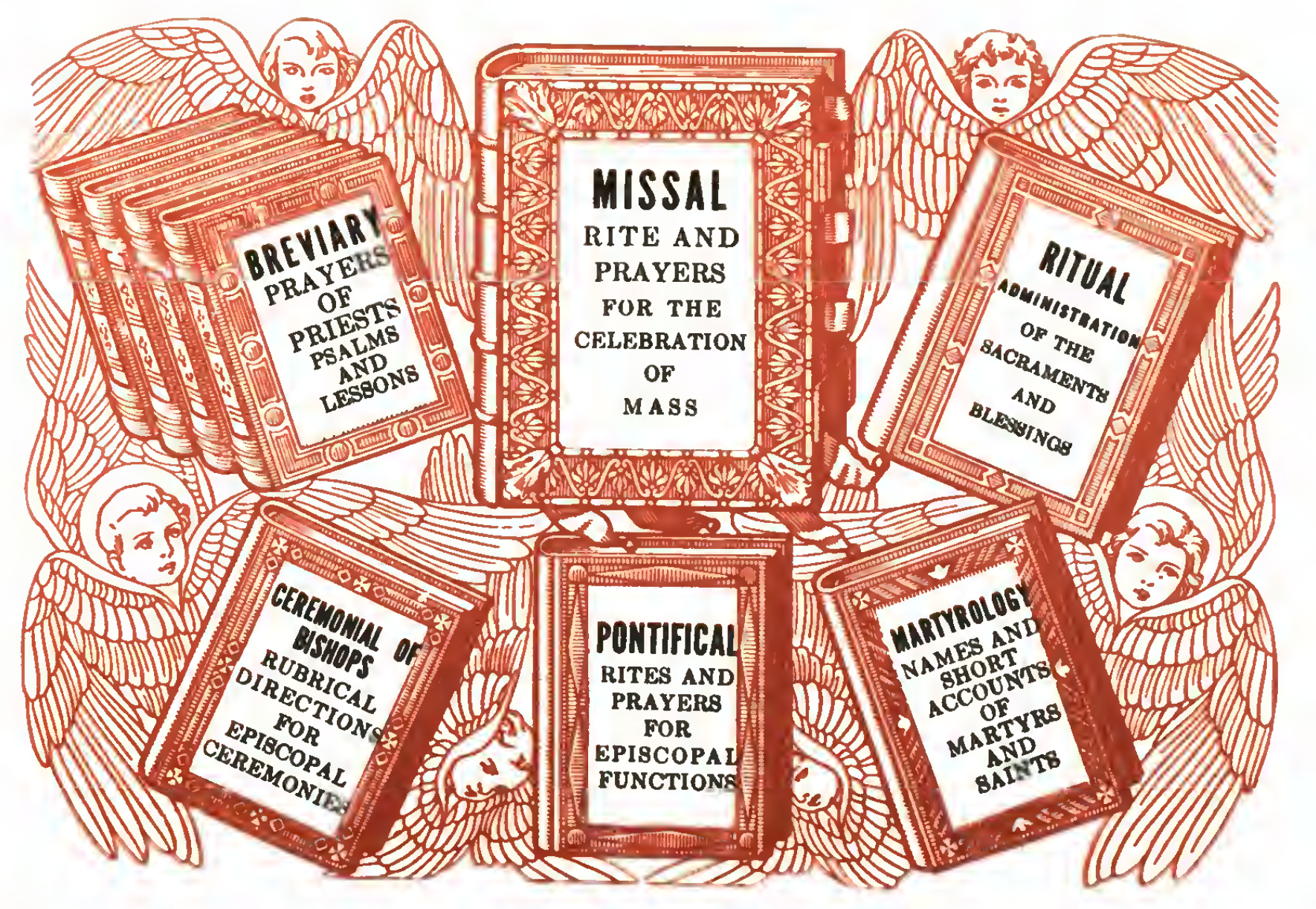
An illustration explaining the purpose of different Roman Rite liturgical books

Within the Roman Rite of the Catholic Church, a variety of liturgical books have been officially approved to contain the words to be recited and the actions to be performed in the celebration of Catholic liturgy. The Roman Rite of the Latin Church of the Catholic Church is the most widely used liturgical rite. The titles of some of these books contain the adjective "Roman", e.g. the Roman Missal, to distinguish them from the liturgical books for the other rites of the church.

== Classification ==
These liturgical books have been classified as seven: the Missal, the Pontifical, the Liturgy of the Hours (in earlier editions called the Breviary), the Ritual, the Martyrology, the Gradual, and the Antiphonary. Another sevenfold list indicates, instead of the last two, the Cæremoniale Episcoporum, and the Memoriale Rituum.

In reality, the number is not fixed. Some names, such as the Ritual and the Pontifical, refer not to a single volume but to a collection of books that fit within the same category. Official liturgical books that appear in neither of the above lists also exist, such as the Lectionary and the Evangeliary or Gospel Book. In 2001, the Fifth Instruction for the Right Implementation of the Constitution on the Liturgy of the Second Vatican Council listed several more. Liturgical books exist also for rare occasions, such as the Order of Rites for the Conclave and the Order of the Rites for the Beginning of the Petrine Ministry of the Bishop of Rome, issued in 2005.

Other liturgical books that no longer exist today, were in use in the past, such as the Epistolary and the Sacramentary (in the proper sense of this word). The catalogue of the illuminated manuscripts of the British Library indicates how varied were the classes of liturgical books for the celebration of Mass and the Liturgy of the Hours.

To avoid confusion between different ways of naming and classifying liturgical books, the International Federation of Library Associations and Institutions has drawn up a List of Uniform Titles for Liturgical Works of the Latin Rites of the Catholic Church.

The Caeremoniale Episcoporum, though listed above as a liturgical book, has also been described as "not a liturgical book in the proper sense, since it is not used in liturgical celebrations".

The contents of the liturgical books vary over the centuries. The prayers and rubrics are modified, new rites are added to the books, others are dropped, sometimes long after they have fallen into disuse. For instance the Roman Pontifical continued to have until the Second Vatican Council a ceremony for the first shaving of a cleric's beard.

== Earliest Christian liturgical books ==
In early Christianity (until perhaps the fourth century) there were no books except the Bible, from which lessons were read and psalms were sung. Nothing in the liturgy was written, because nothing was fixed. Even after certain forms had become so stereotyped as to make already what we should call a more or less fixed liturgy, it does not seem that there was at first any idea that they should be written down. Habit and memory made the celebrant repeat more or less the same forms each Sunday; the people answered his prayers with the accustomed acclamations and responses – all without books.

Adrian Fortescue, in his article on liturgical books in the 1910 Catholic Encyclopedia, quotes one writer who argued that there were liturgical books back to the time of the Apostolic Fathers, and another who claimed that there were no liturgical books even by the end of the fourth century. He himself concludes that they were certainly in existence by the fourth century.

== Earliest Roman liturgical books ==
In the Roman Rite the first complete books known are the Sacramentaries. A Sacramentary is not the same thing as a Missal. It is the book for the priest celebrating Mass. It contains all and only the prayers that he says. At that time he did not repeat at the altar the parts that were chanted by the ministers or choir, as became the custom in the period of the Tridentine Mass Thus Sacramentaries contain no Readings, Introits, Graduals, Communion Antiphons and the like, but only the Collects, the Eucharistic Prayer with its Prefaces, all that is strictly the priest's part at Mass. On the other hand, they provide for occasions other than Mass, with prayers for use at ordinations and at the consecration of a church and altar, and many exorcisms, blessings, and consecrations that were later inserted in the Roman Pontifical and the Roman Ritual. Many Sacramentaries now extant are more or less fragmentary, and do not contain all of these elements.

Another name for the Sacramentary (in Latin Sacramentarium) was Liber Sacramentorum (Book of Sacraments), but "Sacrament" in this case means the Mass.

At the same time as the Sacramentaries, books for the readers and choir were being arranged. Gradually the Comes or Liber Comicus, a book that indicated the texts of the Bible to be read developed into the Evangelarium (Gospel Book) and Lectionarium (Lectionary). The homilies of Fathers to be read were collected in Homilaria, the Acts of the martyrs, read on their feasts, in Martyrologia. The book of Psalms was written separately for singing, then arranged in the order in which the psalms were sung in the Psalterium (Psalter). The parts of the Mass sung by the choir (Introit, Gradual, Offertory, Communion) were arranged in the Liber Antiphonarius or Gradualis (Antiphonary or Gradual), while the Antiphons and Responsories in the Office formed the Liber Responsalis (Responsory Book) or Antiphonarius Officii (Antiphonary of the Office), as distinct from the Antiphonarius Missae (Antiphonary of the Mass). Hymns (in our sense) were introduced into the Roman Rite about the fifth or sixth century. Those of the Mass were written in the Gradual, those of the Divine Office at first in the Psalter or Antiphonary. But there were also separate collections of hymns, called Hymnaria, and Libri Sequentiales or Troponarii containing the sequences and additions (farcing) to the Kyrie and Gloria, etc. Other services, the Sacraments (Baptism, Confirmation, Penance, Marriage, Extreme Unction), the Visitation of the Sick, the Burial Service, all manner of blessings, were written in a very loose collection of little books, predecessors of the Roman Ritual, called by such names as Liber Agendorum, Agenda, Manuale, Benedictionale, Pastorale, Sacerdotale, Rituale.

Finally there remained the rubrics, the directions not about what to say but what to do. This matter would be one of the latest to be written down. Long after the more or less complicated prayers had to be written and read, tradition would still be a sufficient guide for the actions. The books of prayers (Sacramentaries, Antiphonaries, etc.) contained a few words of direction for the most important and salient things to be done – elementary rubrics. For instance the Gregorian Sacramentary tells priests (as distinct from bishops) not to say the Gloria except on Easter Day; the celebrant chants the preface excelsa voce (in a loud voice), and so on. In time, however, the growing elaborateness of the papal functions, the more complicated ceremonial of the Roman Court, made it necessary to draw up rules of what custom and etiquette demanded. These rules are contained in the "Ordines" – precursors of the Cæremoniale Episcoporum. The first of them was probably drawn up about the year 770 in the reign of Pope Stephen III (768-772), but is founded on a similar "Ordo" of the time of Pope Gregory I (590-604). The "Ordines" contain no prayers, except that, where necessary, the first words are given to indicate what is meant. They supplement the Sacramentary and choir-books with careful directions about the ritual.

== Middle Ages ==
During the Middle Ages these books were rearranged for greater convenience. The custom of Low Mass changed the Sacramentary into a Missal. At Low Mass the celebrant had to supplement personally what was normally chanted by the deacon and subdeacon or sung by the choir. This then reacted upon High Mass, so that here too the celebrant began to say himself in a low voice what was sung by some one else. For this purpose he needed texts that were not in the old Sacramentary. That book was therefore enlarged by the addition of Readings (Epistle and Gospel, etc.) and the chants of the choir (Introit, Gradual, etc.). So it becomes a Missale plenarium, containing all the text of the Mass. Isolated cases of such Missals occur as early as the sixth century. By about the twelfth century they have completely replaced the old Sacramentaries. But Lectionaries and Graduals (with the music) are still written for the readers and choir.

In the same way, but rather later, compilations are made of the various books used for saying the Divine Office. Here too the same motive was at work. The Office was meant to be sung in choir. But there were isolated priests, small country churches without a choir, that could not afford the library of books required for saying it. For their convenience compendiums were made since the eleventh century. Pope Gregory VII (1073–1085) issued a compendium of this kind that became very popular. First we hear of Libri nocturnales or matutinales, containing all the lessons and responses for Matins. To these are added later the antiphons and psalms, then the collects and all that is wanted for the other canonical hours too. At the same time epitomes are made for people who recite the Office without the chant. In these the Psalter is often left out; the clergy are supposed to know it by heart. The antiphons, versicles, responsories, even the lessons are indicated only by their first words. The whole is really a kind of concise index to the Office, but sufficient for people who said it day after day and almost knew it by heart. Such little books are called by various names – Epitomata, Portiforia, and then especially Breviaria divini officii (Abbreviations of the Divine Office). They were used mostly by priests on journeys. The parts of these Breviaries were filled up eventually so as to leave nothing to memory, but the convenient arrangement and the name have been kept. It is curious that the word Breviary, which originally meant only a handy epitome for use on journeys and such occasions, came to be the usual name for the Divine Office itself. A priest "said his breviary" that is, recited the canonical hours.

The development of the other books took place in much the same way. The Missals now contained only the Mass and a few morning services intimately connected with it. Daily Mass was the custom for every priest; there was no object in including all the rites used only by a bishop in each Missal. So these rites apart formed the Pontifical. The other non-Eucharistic elements of the old Sacramentary combined with the Libri Agendarum to form the later Ritual.

== Council of Trent onwards ==
The Council of Trent (1545–1563) considered the question of uniformity in the liturgical books and appointed a commission to examine the question, but the commission found the work of unifying so many and so varied books impossible at the time, and so left it to be done gradually by the popes. The reformed Breviary was promulgated by Pope Pius V with the Apostolic Constitution Quod a nobis of 9 July 1568, and the Roman Missal soon afterward, with the Apostolic Constitution Quo primum of 14 July 1570. The Roman Martyrology was produced by Pope Gregory XIII in 1584. The Roman Pontifical appeared in 1596. The Caeremoniale Episcoporum was issued by Pope Clement VIII in 1600. The Roman Ritual was published in 1614.

All the books have been constantly revised and re-edited with additions and revisions down to our own time, and more information may be found in the articles dedicated to the individual books.

== Liturgical books of the Roman Rite ==
Liturgical books of the Roman Rite and their history and content include:

For the celebration of Mass:

- Roman Missal
  - Sacramentary
    - Gelasian Sacramentary
    - Drogo Sacramentary
  - Mass of Paul VI
  - Tridentine Mass
  - Pre-Tridentine Mass
  - Divine Worship: The Missal
- Lectionary (Readings of the Mass)
  - Evangeliary (Gospel Book)
- Gradual (Musical book for the Mass)
  - Roman Gradual
  - Graduale Simplex
  - Kyriale

For the celebration of the Divine Office:

- Liturgy of the Hours (Divine Office)
  - Book of hours
  - Breviary
  - Reform of the Roman Breviary by Pope Pius X
  - Primer
  - Psalter
  - Divine Worship: Daily Office
- Roman Antiphonary (Musical book for the Liturgy of the Hours)
  - Roman Vesperal
- Liber Usualis (Consolidated book of the Gradual and Antiphonary)

Liturgical calendar:

- General Roman Calendar
  - Tridentine calendar
  - General Roman Calendar of 1954
  - General Roman Calendar of Pope Pius XII
  - General Roman Calendar of 1960
  - General Roman Calendar of 1969

For sacraments and blessings whose ordinary minister is the bishop:

- Roman Pontifical

For sacraments and blessings whose ordinary minister is the priest:

- Roman Ritual
  - Benedictional

List of most Catholic saints:

- Roman Martyrology
  - Martyrology of Usuard
  - Martyrologium Hieronymianum
  - Liberian Catalogue

On how the bishop celebrate Mass and the Divine Office (useful for priests too):

- Cæremoniale Episcoporum
  - Ordines Romani
