= Liturgical use of Latin =

Use of Latin in Christian liturgies

Liturgical use of Latin is the practice of performing Christian liturgy in Ecclesiastical Latin, typically in the liturgical rites of the Latin Church.

== History ==
=== 2nd–16th centuries ===
The use of liturgical Latin in Western Christianity began in North Africa around the late second century under Pope Victor I, who introduced Latin alongside the existing liturgical use of Koine Greek. In the following centuries, Latin increasingly supplanted Greek in Roman liturgies because Latin was a vernacular language understood by the congregation. In the seventh century, there was a short-lived return to Greek liturgy, likely due to immigrants from the East, but Latin was soon reestablished as the Roman liturgical language. Over time, as vernacular languages drifted further from Latin, the use of Latin came to be understood in terms of its role as a sacred language.

=== 16th–20th centuries ===
Although Catholic scholars had discussed a shift to vernacular languages beforehand, the 16th-century Protestant Reformation championed the cause of vernacular liturgy and linked it to anti-Catholic sentiments. In response, the Catholic Church's Council of Trent, while not condemning vernacular liturgy in principle, discouraged its indiscriminate use and defended Latin's suitability for worship. After the council's conclusion, Pope Pius V codified and widely mandated the use of revised liturgical books of the Roman Rite that continued the tradition of Latin-only ritual.

Latin persisted in use in some Protestant liturgies following the Reformation, which had generally valued the use of vernacular liturgies. The Church of England's 1549 Book of Common Prayer was translated into Latin for mostly academic purposes but there was some liturgical usage of that translation among Irish priests who knew only Gaelic and Latin. The practice of translating Anglican liturgy into Latin translations continued with the 1662 prayer book, as well as the 1979 Book of Common Prayer of the Episcopal Church in the United States.

Calls for vernacular liturgy were a hallmark of the condemned Jansenist movement of the 17th century. Although the question of vernacular liturgy for Latin-derived Romance languages remained contentious, Pope Paul V and subsequent pontiffs authorized limited use of the vernacular in mission territories, including in China, Georgia, and modern-day Montreal. In Dalmatia and parts of Istria, the liturgy was celebrated in Church Slavonic in lieu of Latin, and authorization for use of this language was extended to some other Slavic regions between 1886 and 1935.

=== 20th century–present ===
Pope John XXIII was a strong proponent of the value of Latin for the liturgy and the entire church. In 1962, he released an encyclical entitled Veterum Sapientia in which he praised Latin for its impartiality, universality, immutability, formative value, historicity, and dignity as an elevated, non-vernacular language. Later that year, he opened the Second Vatican Council, which, after John XXIII's death, was continued by his successor, Pope Paul VI. The council, while affirming the primacy of Latin, allowed limited use of the vernacular in its 1963 Constitution on the Sacred Liturgy (Sacrosanctum Concilium). In 1964, the Sacred Congregation of Rites, in implementation of the constitution, authorized episcopal conferences to prepare liturgical books with vernacular translations of many parts of the Mass.

Beginning in 1970, the liturgical books of the Roman Rite were completely revised. This revision included permission to celebrate all rituals entirely in vernacular languages in accord with approved translations of the authoritative Latin texts. These texts allow for the Mass of Paul VI to be celebrated in Latin.

In 1988, Pope John Paul II, in the apostolic letter Ecclesia Dei, permitted bishops to authorize the celebration of the pre-conciliar Latin Tridentine Mass for groups that requested it. In 2007, Pope Benedict XVI promulgated the apostolic letter Summorum Pontificum which gave broad permission to use the pre-1970s reform Latin-language liturgical books. In 2021, Pope Francis restricted the scope of these permissions with his apostolic letter Traditionis custodes.

== Current usage in the Catholic Church ==
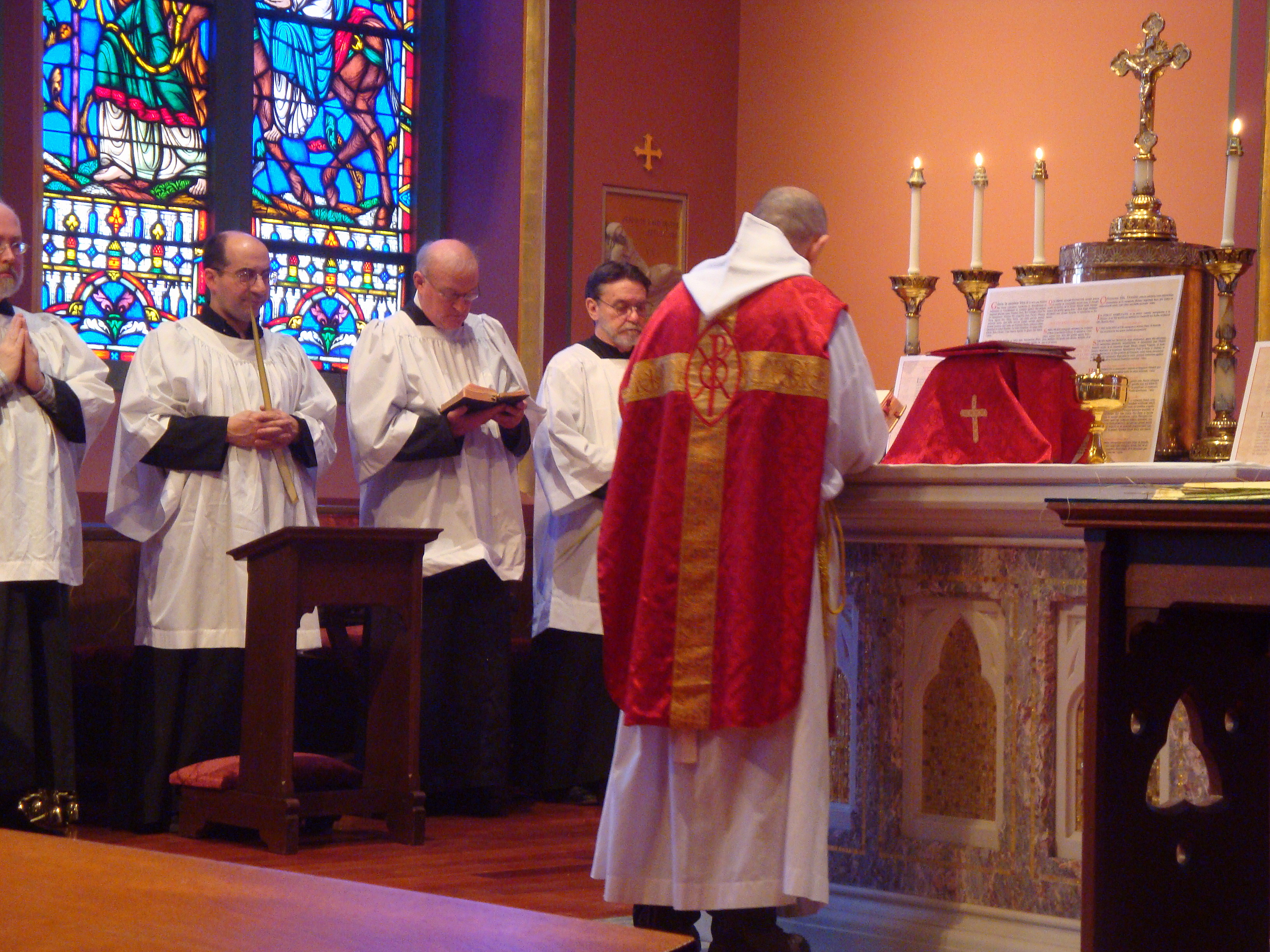
Mass celebrated in Latin in a chapel of the Cathedral of the Holy Cross, Boston

=== Typical editions ===
In the Roman Rite of the Latin Church, Latin is the language in which the typical editions of the liturgical books are promulgated. The typical editions are those on which all vernacular translations must be based.

=== Latin as a language option ===
Even when the primary language of the mass is a vernacular, certain invariable parts of the mass are sometimes recited or sung in Latin, including the Gloria, Credo, Sanctus, Pater Noster, and Agnus Dei.

In 2004, the Congregation for Divine Worship affirmed that priests are always permitted to celebrate mass in Latin outside of scheduled vernacular masses.

=== Traditionalist usage ===
Catholic groups that identify as Traditionalist continue to make use of older liturgical books that prescribe rituals predominantly in Latin.
