= Gradual of Manuel I of Portugal =

c. 1500 gradual or kyriale

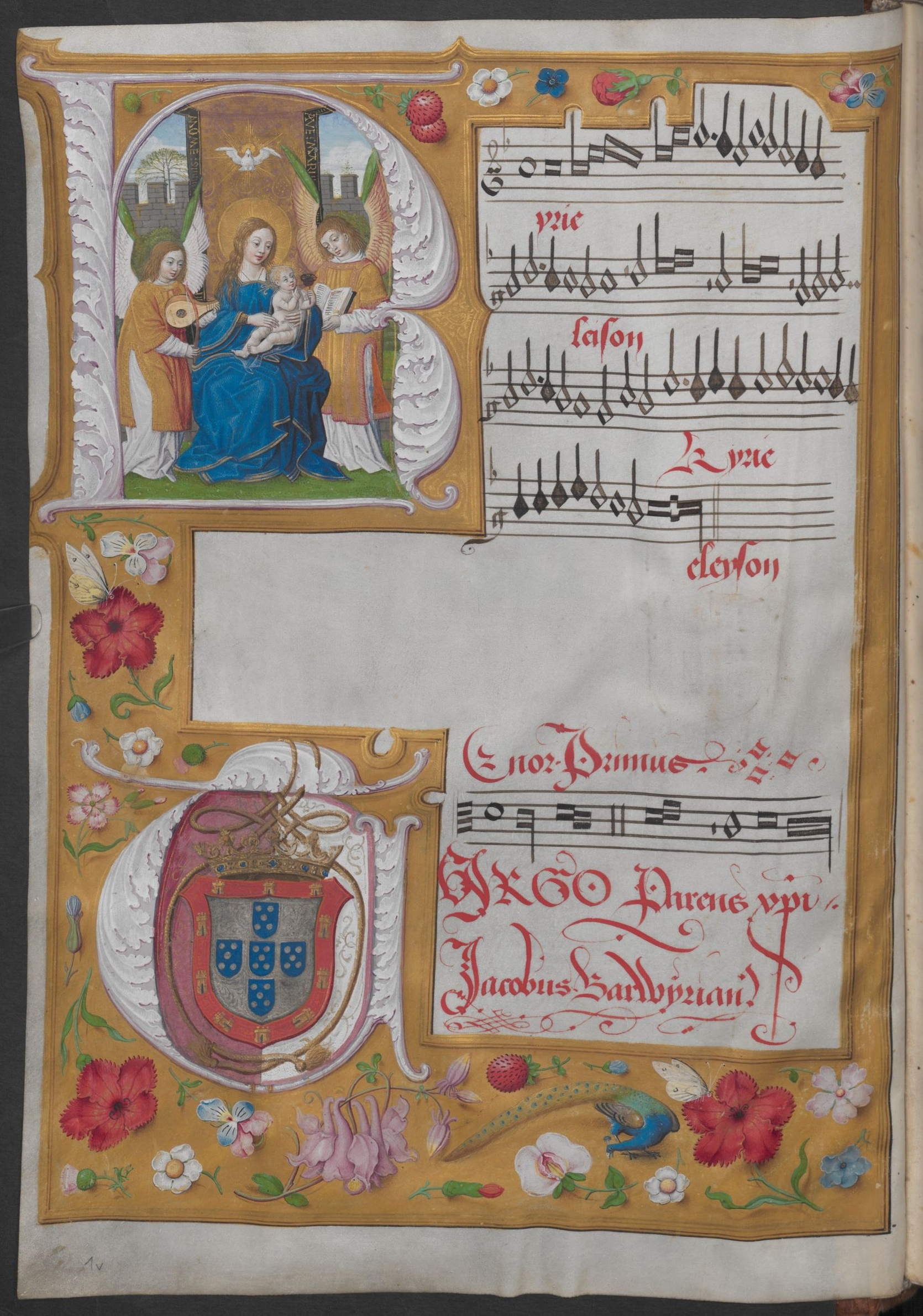
- Opening of the Missa Virgo parens Christi by Jacobus Barbireau, on the first illuminated folio
- Original title: Missae Partes Decantari Solitae
- Subject: Roman Gradual
- Publication date: c. 1500
- Pages: 255, recto-verso

The Gradual of Manuel I of Portugal (Portuguese: Gradual de D. Manuel I) is a kyriale or gradual dated c. 1500, originally owned by King Manuel I of Portugal. It contains Gregorian chant settings for the Ordinary of the Mass (Kyrie, Gloria, Credo, Sanctus, and Agnus Dei), comprising a total of eighteen complete polyphonic Masses (and two unfinished ones) by the foremost contemporary composers, among them Jacobus Barbireau, Alexander Agricola, Pierre de la Rue, Marbrianus de Orto, Josquin des Prez, Johannes Ghiselin, and Antoine Brumel.

It is currently part of the collections of the Austrian National Library, in Vienna, shelfmark Ms. 1783.

== History ==
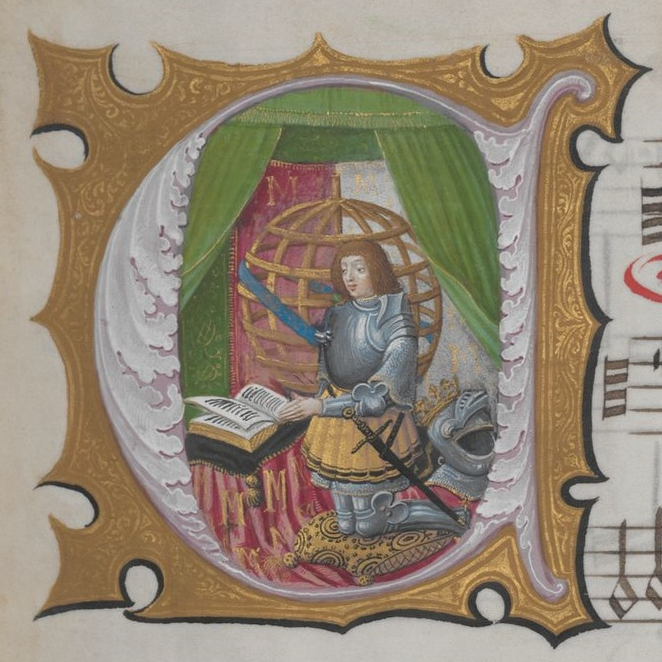
Depiction of King Manuel I in the gradual.

The artists that produced the codex have not been conclusively established. It was previously incorrectly and anachronistically attributed to Francisco de Holanda, although his father António de Holanda, then a young man, is not outside the realm of possibility. More recent scholarship attributes part of the codex to calligrapher and music scribe Martin Bourgeois, based on the inscription "hinc Burgos" found within one of the litterae cadassae, and on stylistic similarities to the c. 1504-06 Choirbook of Philip the Fair and Juana of Castile (Royal Library of Belgium, MS 9126), which has been attributed to him.

It is known that the manuscript was commissioned by Manuel I of Portugal on the occasion of his second marriage, to Maria of Aragon, daughter of the Catholic Monarchs, in 1500. The king was a noted music-lover, as detailed in the chronicles of Damião de Góis.

The Gradual was left to the king's daughter, Isabella of Portugal, the wife of Charles V, Holy Roman Emperor, thus explaining its incorporation into the Imperial Court Library (precursor of the modern Austrian National Library).
