= Roman Pontifical =

Christian ritual book

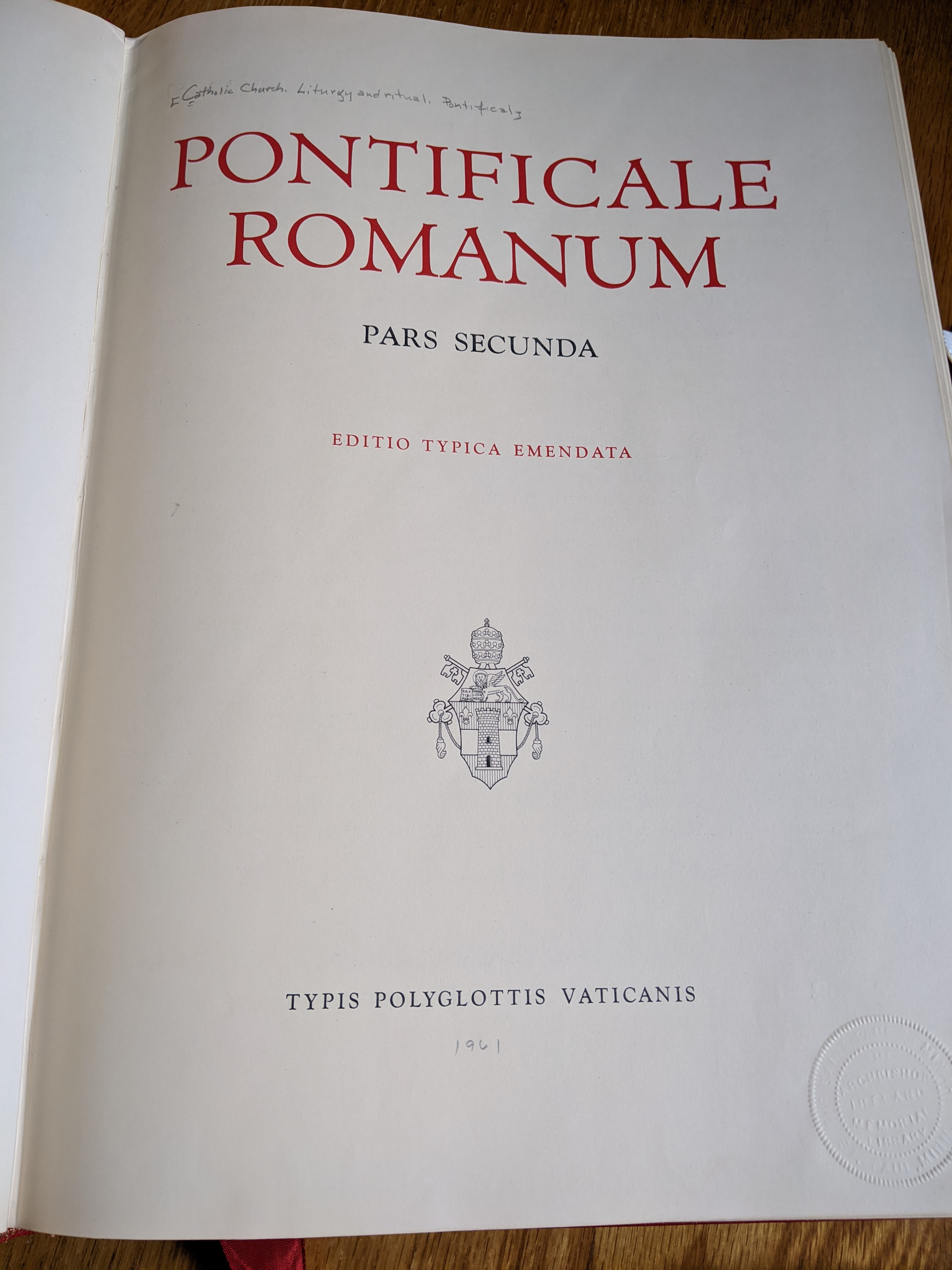
A 1961 Pontificale Romanum

The Roman Pontifical (Latin: Pontificale Romanum) is the pontifical as used in Roman Rite liturgies of the Catholic Church. It is the liturgical book that contains the rites and ceremonies usually performed by bishops.

The pontifical is the compendium of rites for the enactment of certain sacraments and sacramentals that may be celebrated by a bishop, including especially the consecration of holy chrism, and the sacraments of confirmation and holy orders. However, it does not include the rites for the Mass or the Divine Office, which can be found in the Roman Missal and Breviary respectively. Because of the use of the adjective pontifical in other contexts to refer to the Pope, it is sometimes mistakenly thought that the Pontificale Romanum is a book reserved to the Pope. It could be argued that it is the book of those entitled to the use, in certain contexts, of the pontificalia, i.e. episcopal insignia. These are not always limited just to bishops, but according to current 1983 Code of Canon Law of the Latin Church, it can in certain circumstances be used by others, such as abbots and rulers of dioceses or quasi-dioceses who have not been ordained bishops.

== Sources ==
The Pontifical has its sources mostly in texts and rubrics which existed in the old sacramentaries and Ordines Romani and were gradually collected together to form one volume for the greater convenience of the officiating bishop. The earliest pontificals date from the late ninth century. From the mid-tenth century, one particular compilation, known to historians as the Pontificale Romano-Germanicum, became dominant, and was widely copied.

== Edition history ==
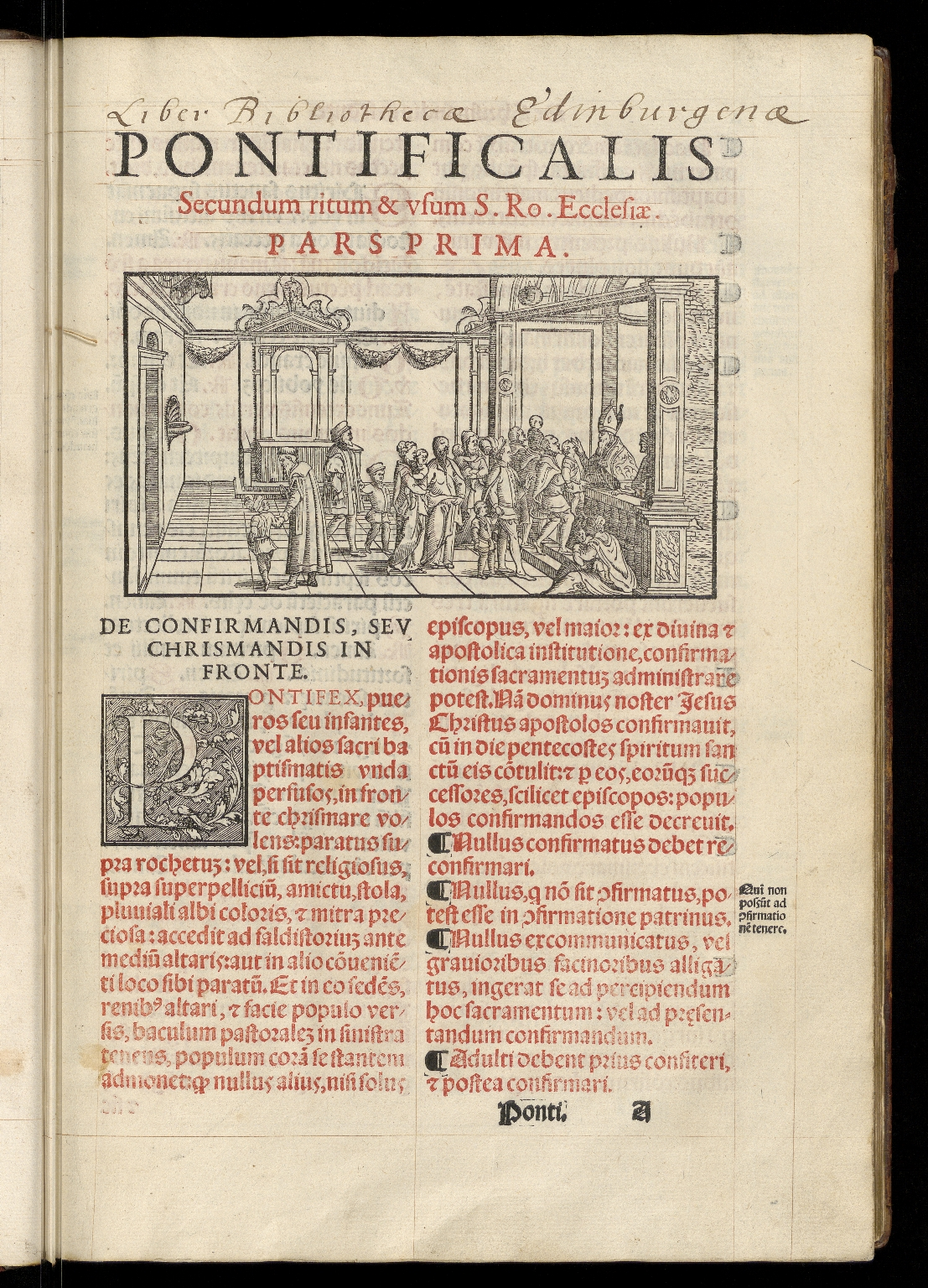
First page of a 1572 Pontificale Romanum

Under Clement VIII, a standard version was published for the use of the entire Roman Rite, under the title Pontificale Romanum. It was reprinted by authority with many variations many times, and its last typical edition following this form is from 1962. In 1968, it was recast and restructured according to the decisions of the Second Vatican Council. In December 2021, six months after the promulgation of the motu propio, Traditionis custodes, which put restrictions on the use of the Missal of 1962, Arthur Roche, Prefect of the Congregation for Divine Worship and the Discipline of the Sacraments, stated that Bishops did not have permission to authorize the use of the Pontificale Romanum that was issued in 1962 and that this edition was no longer in use. On February 11, 2022, however, Pope Francis clarified in a Latin statement that the Priestly Fraternity of St. Peter, and bishops who work with their priests and apostolates, may continue to utilize the former liturgical books ("namely the Missal, the Ritual, the Pontifical and the Roman Breviary, in force in the year 1962"), and other former Ecclesia Dei communities have taken this to mean that the same applies to them.

== See also ==
- Breviary
- Cæremoniale Episcoporum
- Euchologion
- Missal
- Pontifical vestments
- Rituale Romanum
- Solemn Pontifical Mass
