= Caeremoniale Episcoporum =

Latin Catholic ritual book

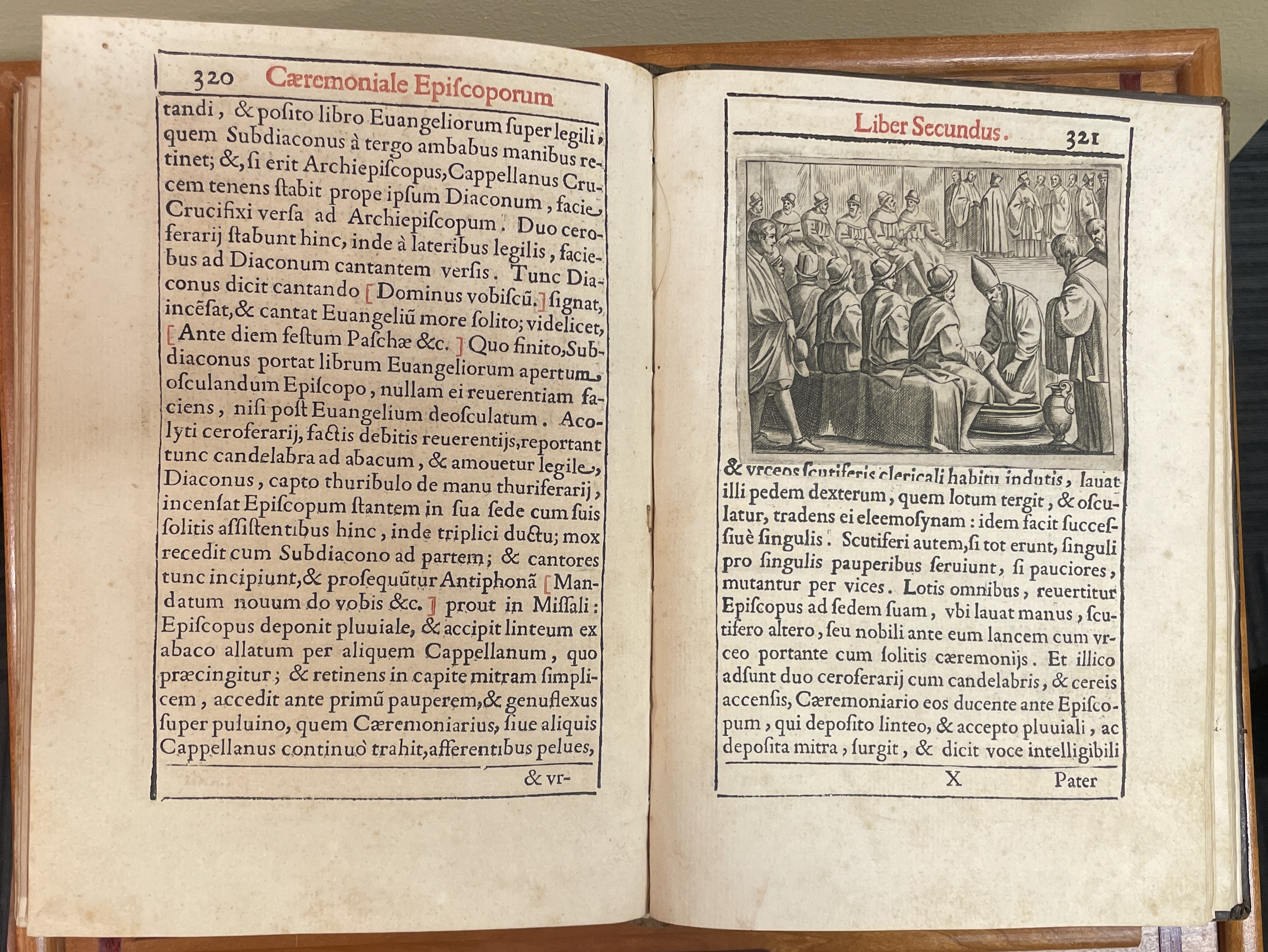
- A 1651 edition of the Caeremoniale Episcoporum in the collection of the Museum of Catholic Art and History.
- Publication date: 14 July 1600

The Cæremoniale Episcoporum (transl. Ceremonial of Bishops) is a liturgical book that describes the church services to be performed by bishops of the Latin Church of the Catholic Church.

== History ==
Pope Clement VIII published the first book to bear this name on 14 July 1600. It was a revision, in line with the renewal ordered by the Council of Trent, of the contents of books, called Ordines Romani, written from the end of the seventh century onwards to describe the ceremonies for the election and ordination of a Pope and to give indications for Mass and other celebrations by the Pope in the course of the year. The contents of these books were enriched over time. A work in two sections, which became known as De Cæremoniis Cardinalium et Episcoporum in eorum diœcesibus (Ceremonies of Cardinals and Bishops in Their Own Dioceses) was added in the sixteenth century. Pope Clement VIII's Cæremoniale Episcoporum was based on these texts and on others which have now been lost. The work of preparation, begun in December 1582 under Pope Gregory XIII took 17 years. A facsimile of the original 1600 edition in two books was published by Libreria Editrice Vaticana in 2000.

Pope Innocent X issued a revised edition in 1650. In 1727 or 1729 the chapters, originally printed as single blocks, were divided into numbered paragraphs and summaries were added at the head of each chapter, in place of the previous titles. In 1752, Pope Benedict XIV revised slightly the two preexisting books and added a third on ceremonies to be observed by those holding civil office in the Papal States.

In 1886, Pope Leo XIII made yet another revision, in which, though the Papal States had been incorporated into the Kingdom of Italy, he kept the third book. The Catholic Encyclopedia gives an account of the Cæremoniale Episcoporum as it stood after this 1886 revision.

== Contemporary versions ==
In line with the renewal ordered by the Second Vatican Council, a fully revised edition in a single volume was issued by Pope John Paul II in 1984, replacing the earlier editions. A reprint with multiple corrections followed in 1985. The revision aimed at securing an episcopal liturgy that was "simple, and at the same time noble, fully effective pastorally, and capable of serving as an example for all other liturgical celebrations".

An English translation, Ceremonial of Bishops, was published 1989. The book is in eight parts:

1. Episcopal liturgy in general
2. Mass
3. Liturgy of the Hours and Celebrations of the Word of God
4. Celebrations of the Mysteries of the Lord in the course of the year
5. Sacraments
6. Sacramentals
7. Noteworthy dates in the life of a bishop
8. Liturgical celebrations connected with solemn acts of episcopal governance

There are also appendices on:

1. The vesture of prelates
2. A table of liturgical days arranged in order of precedence
3. A table on Ritual Masses, Masses for Various Needs, Votive Masses and Requiem Masses
4. Lists of abbreviations and sigla used in the book

== See also ==
- Roman Ritual
- Roman Pontifical
- Liturgical Books of the Roman Rite
