= Roman Gradual =

Liturgical book of the Latin Church

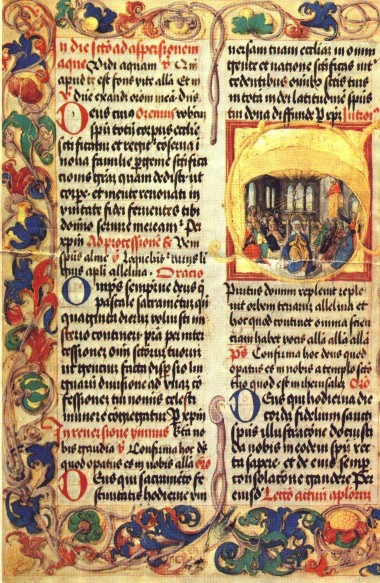
Gradual of King John I Albert of Poland in the Sacristy of Wawel Cathedral.

The Roman Gradual (Latin: Graduale Romanum) is an official liturgical book of the Roman Rite of the Catholic Church containing chants, including the proper and many more, for use in Mass.

The editio typica dates from 1908. The latest edition of 1974 takes account of the 1970 revision of the Roman Missal.

In 1979, the Graduale Triplex: The Roman Gradual With the Addition of Neums from Ancient Manuscripts (ISBN 978-2852740440 in English (1985), ISBN 978-2-85274-094-5 in Latin) was published. It added reproductions of the neumes from ancient manuscripts placed above and below the later notation.

== Description ==
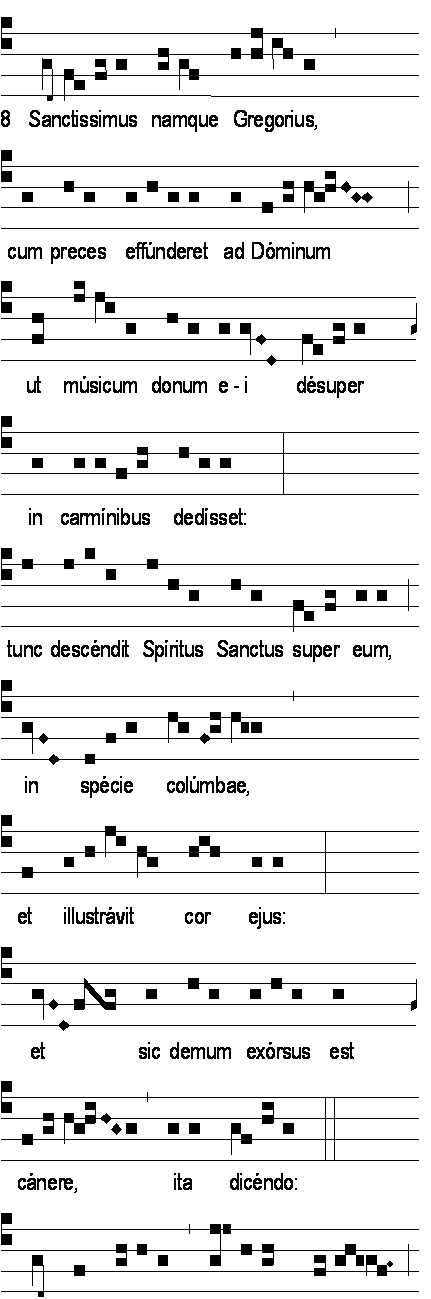
Sanctissimus namque Gregorius, from the 1908 edition of the Roman Gradual.

The Roman Gradual includes the

- Introit (entrance chant: antiphon with verses),
- the Gradual psalm (a meditative psalm chant, according to the 1970 rite this may be replaced with a simpler responsorial psalm except when the Mass is celebrated "in Cantu" according to the rubrics of the accompanying document Ordo Cantus Missae), or an additional Alleluia verse during Eastertide,
- the Sequence Hymn (obligatory on Easter and Pentecost, optional on Corpus Christi and Our Lady of Sorrows),
- the Alleluia chant, or the tract during Lent (before 1970 also during the Septuagesima),
- the offertory chant,
- and the Communion antiphon.

It includes a selection of chants that are also published in a companion volume known as the Kyriale, a collection of chants for the Order of Mass: the Kyrie, Gloria, Credo, Sanctus, and Agnus Dei.

There have been and are other Graduals, apart from the Roman Gradual. For instance, the Dominican Order had its own rite of Mass and its own Gradual: "Graduale juxta ritum sacri Ordinis Praedicatorum" (Gradual according to the rite of the Sacred Order of Preachers).

== Structure of the 1974 edition ==
The 1974 Roman Gradual is arranged into 8 major sections:

1. Praenotanda (Rubrics)
2. Proprium de Tempore (Proper of Seasons)
3. Communia (Commons)
4. Proprium de Sanctis (Proper of Saints)
5. Missae Rituales ad Diversa et Votivae (Ritual and Votive Masses)
6. Cantus in Ordine Missae Occurrentes (Chants Occurring in Order of Mass, including the Kyriale).
7. Appendix (Containing hymns and litanies)
8. Missae Propriae Ordinis Sancti Benedicti (Mass Propers of the Order of Saint Benedict)

== History ==
Originally the book was called an antiphonale missarum ("Antiphonal of the Mass"). Graduals, like the later Cantatory, may have originally included only the responsorial items, the Gradual, Alleluia, and Tract.

In 1908 a revised edition of the Roman Gradual was published. In it Pope Pius X gave official approval to the work of the monastery of Solesmes, founded in the 1830s by Dom Guéranger, was done by Dom Pothier in restoring Gregorian chant to its purity by removing the alterations it had undergone in the centuries immediately preceding. The work had involved much research and study.

That edition of the Roman Gradual was the basis also of a more general compilation of chants known as the Liber Usualis. This was not an official liturgical book, but it contained a large part of the chants of the Roman Gradual, as well as other chants and hymns and instructions on the proper way to sing them.

In 1974, after the Second Vatican Council an edition of the Roman Gradual based on that of 1908 was issued. While the melodies remained unchanged, there was a relocation of pieces to fit the revised Roman Missal and calendar. Some chants were replaced by ancient ones rediscovered after 1908. A simpler gradual for small churches or inexperienced choirs was published in 1967 and 1975, as the Graduale Simplex.

In 2011 (Part 1 De dominicis et festis) and 2018 (Part 2 De feriis et sanctis) the Graduale novum was published by Christian Dostal, Johannes Berchmans Göschl, Cornelius Pouderoijen, Franz Karl Praßl, Heinrich Rumphorst, and Stephan Zippe, members of the melodic restitution group of AISCGre (International Society for the Study of Gregorian Chant). It claims to be “a more critical edition” according to SC 117, but is not a critical edition.

Despite an initial disappearance of the use of the Roman Gradual from many parishes following the Second Vatican Council, often done out of a misunderstanding that Gregorian Chant had been abrogated or otherwise discouraged, its use has become increasingly popular in recent years. Parishes which celebrate the Mass according to the 1970 Roman Missal, whether fully in Latin or a vernacular language, have begun to utilize the chants of the Gradual. This has been encouraged by the most recent Popes, including Pope Francis who has encouraged the presence of a Schola Cantorum in every parish so that at least one Mass might be celebrated with the Church's official music.

== Bibliography and external links ==
- Abbaye Saint-Pierre de Solesmes. Graduale Romanum. Desclée & Co., Tournai, Belgium 1974. ISBN 2-85274-094-X
- Jeffrey Tucker: The Real Catholic Songbook
- Bergeron, Katherine. Decadent enchantments: the revival of Gregorian chant at Solesmes. Berkeley : University of California Press, c1998. ISBN 0-520-21008-5.
- Gregorian Chant Propers (ccwatershed.org).
