= Pontificale Romano-Germanicum =

10th century Catholic liturgical practice

The Pontificale Romano-Germanicum (Roman-Germanic pontifical), also known as the PRG, is a set of Latin documents of Catholic liturgical practice compiled in Saint Alban's Abbey, Mainz, under the reign of William (archbishop of Mainz), in the 10th century and an influential work in the establishment of the Catholic Church in Europe.

It was in wide circulation during the Middle Ages and was used as the basis for the modern Roman Pontifical. It contains 258 Ordines describing ecclesiastical procedures including rites of ordination, blessing, baptism, celebrations of Mass, confession, etc. It has significant novel content: for instance, rites and prayers for the beginning of Lent, subsequently widely adopted, that had nothing to do with existing Roman liturgy. The term "Pontificale Romano-Germanicum" for this body of documents was coined by its discoverer, Michel Andrieu. The definitive edition was compiled by the theologian Cyrille Vogel and historian Reinhard Elze. A redaction of the text, the Cracow Pontifical (Pontificale Cracoviense saeculi XI), believed to be written at Tyniec in the late 11th century, resides as MS 2057 in the Jagiellonian Library in Kraków.
