= Liber Usualis =

Book of commonly used Gregorian chants

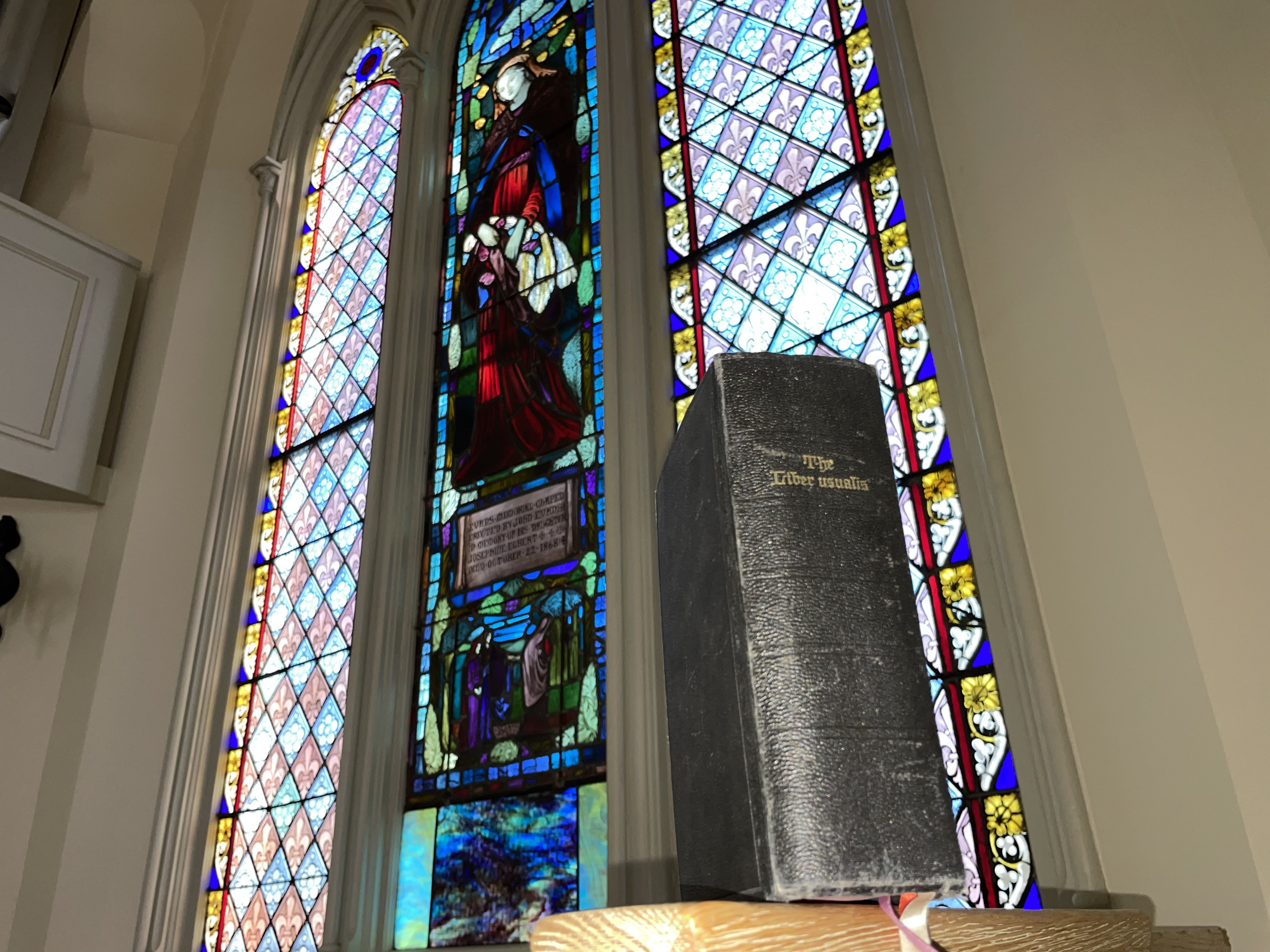
A copy of the Liber Usualis

The Liber Usualis (Liber Usualis missæ et officii pro Dominicis et festis cum cantu Gregoriano or "Book for Use at Masses and Offices of Sundays and Feasts with their Gregorian Chants") is a liturgical book of commonly used Gregorian chants in the Catholic tradition, compiled by the monks of the Abbey of Solesmes in France and first published in 1898. It gathered between two covers the ordinary and proper chants from the Kyriale and Graduale needed for Masses of Sunday and important Holy Days; those for Vespers from the Antiphonale; and Matins of Christmas, the Paschal Triduum, Pentecost Sunday, Corpus Christi, and All Souls' Day, along with the Office of the Dead from the Nocturnale. Its most important omissions are the chants for the weekdays of Lent and the Ember Days.

The Liber was first edited in 1896 by Solesmes Abbot Dom André Mocquereau (1849–1930). Its use has decreased since the liturgical reform that took place in 1970, that replaced the Tridentine Mass with the Mass of Paul VI, and the Divine Office with the Liturgy of the Hours. In 1974 a new Graduale Romanum (and in 1990 a Gregorian Missal) appeared in response to the same council's mandate that Gregorian chant should retain "pride of place" in the liturgy (Sacrosanctum Concilium, 116). It resigned the traditional chants according to the new calendar, but introduction of the vernacular has hindered widespread use of Latin chant. The 1964 Liber usualis continues to be used locally where permission exists for celebrations according to the vetus ordo.

== History ==
The 1904 edition or Vatican Edition was adopted as the official replacement for the Medici Edition that was promulgated following the Council of Trent, beating the rival Ratisbon Edition prepared by Friedrich Pustet.

== Organization ==
The Liber has appeared in about 50 editions all with numerous appendixes according to local usages, resulting in some confusion and occasional duplication of page numbering. The principal divisions are:

- Ordinary of the Mass (pp11-111)
- Recitation formulas and Psalms & Canticles of the Divine Office (pp.112-316)
- Proper of Time (pp. 317-1110)
- Common of Saints (pp. 1112-1302)
- Proper of Saints, running from St Andrew (30 November) to St Sylvester (28 November) (pp. 1303-1762)

This 1,900-page book contains most versions of the ordinary chants for the Mass (Kyrie, Gloria, Credo, Sanctus, and Agnus Dei), as well as the common chants for the Divine Office (daily prayers of the Church) and for every commonly celebrated feast of the Church year—including more than two hundred pages for Holy Week alone—as practiced prior to the 1969 liturgical reforms of Pope Paul VI. The "usual book" or "common book" also contains chants for specific rituals, such as nuptial Masses, Requiem Masses and the Office of the Dead, ordinations, and Benediction. This modal, monophonic Latin music has been sung in the Catholic Church since at least the sixth century to the present day. An extensive introduction explains how to read and interpret the medieval musical notation (square notation of neums or neumes). There are separate indexes for Feasts and musical items, the later further subdivided by genre (Introits, Graduals, etc.).

== Bibliography and external links ==
- Solesmes Abbey
- Liber Usualis (1961, Solesmes notation with a four line staff) in PDF format (121 MB)
- St. Bonaventure Press reprint of 1953 Liber
- Liber Usualis (1896 ed.) in PDF format (200 MB)
- Bergeron, Katherine. Decadent enchantments: the revival of Gregorian chant at Solesmes. Berkeley: University of California Press, c1998. ISBN 0-520-21008-5.
- Nova Organi Harmonia (a nearly complete organ accompaniment to the Liber Usualis)
