= Roman Ritual =

One of the official ritual works of the Roman Rite of the Catholic Church

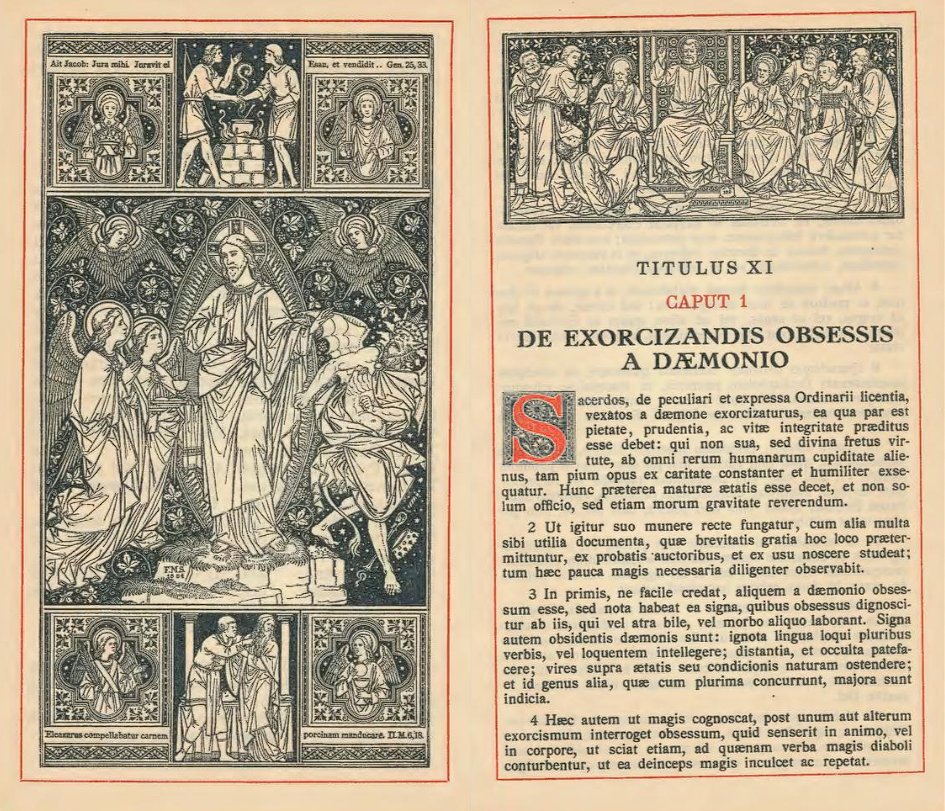
- Title XI of the 1925 Roman Ritual which contains the rites of exorcism
- Original title: Rituale Romanum
- Language: Latin
- Published: 1614 by Pope Paul V
- Text: Roman Ritual at Wikisource

The Roman Ritual (Latin: Rituale Romanum), also known as the Ritual, is one of the official liturgical books of the Roman Rite of the Latin Church of the Catholic Church. It contains all of the services that a priest or deacon may perform; and are not contained in the Missale Romanum, Pontificale Romanum, or Caeremoniale Episcoporum, but for convenience does include some rituals that one of these books contains.

Since 1969, the Roman Ritual has been divided into different volumes by subject, for standard use in the Latin Church, yet priests and communities that celebrate pre-Second Vatican Council rituals still use the edition of 1952.

== History ==
When ritual manual books first were written, the Sacramentary in the West and the Euchologion in the East, they contained all of the bishops' and priests' parts for all rituals, not only for Mass and Divine Liturgy, respectively, but for all of the other Sacraments, blessings, other rituals, and all sacramentals.

=== From one book to many ===
The contents of the Roman Ritual and Pontificale Romanum were in the Sacramentaries. In the Eastern Churches this state of things still largely continues. In the West a further development led to the distinction of books, not according to the persons who use them, but according to the rituals for which they are used. The Missal, containing the whole Mass, succeeded by the Sacramentary. Some early missals included other rituals for the convenience of celebrants, but on the whole this later arrangement involved the need of other books to supply the non-Eucharistic rituals of the Sacramentary. These books, when they appeared, were the predecessors of the Pontificale Romanum and Roman Ritual. The bishop's functions, including Ordination and Confirmation, filled the Pontificale Romanum. The priest's functions, including Baptism, Penance, Matrimony, and Extreme Unction, were contained in a variety of little handbooks that eventually the Roman Ritual replaced.

=== Codification ===
The Pontificale Romanum emerged first. The book under this name, also known as the Pontifical of Egbert, occurs already in the eighth century. From the ninth there was a multitude of pontificals. For priests' functions there was no uniform book until 1614. Some of these functions were contained in the pontificals; often the principal ones were added to missals and books of hours. Then special books were arranged, but there was no uniformity in arrangement or name. Through the Middle Ages a great number of handbooks for priests having the care of souls were written. Every local rite and almost every diocese had them; indeed many were compilations for the convenience of one specific priest or church. Such books had many titles: Manuale, Liber Agendarum, Agenda, Sacramentale, or Rituale. Specimens of such medieval predecessors of the Ritual are the Manuale Curatorum of Roeskilde in Denmark (first printed in 1513; edited by J. Freisen, Paderborn, 1898), and the Liber Agendarum of Schleswig (printed in 1416; Paderborn, 1898). The book of Roeskilde contains the rituals for benediction of salt and water, Baptism, Matrimony, benediction of a house, visitation of the sick with Viaticum and Extreme Unction, prayers for the dead, funerals, prayers for pilgrims, benediction of fire on Holy Saturday, and other benedictions. The book of Schleswig has much of the Holy Week rituals, and those for All Souls, Candlemas, and Ash Wednesday. In both many rituals differ from the Roman forms.

=== 16th century ===
In the sixteenth century, while the other liturgical books were being revised and issued as uniform standards, there was naturally a desire to substitute an official book for the varied collections. But the matter did not receive the attention of the Holy See for some time. First, various books were issued in Rome with the idea of securing uniformity, but without official sanction. Albert Castellani in 1537 published a Sacerdotale of this kind; in 1579 in Venice another version appeared that Grancesco Samarino, Canon of the Lateran Archbasilica arranged and which was re-edited in 1583 by Angelo Rocca. In 1586 Giulio Antonio Santorio, Cardinal of Santa Severina, printed a handbook of rituals for the use of priests, which, according to Pope Paul V, "he had composed after long study and with much industry and labor" (Apostolicae Sedis). This book is the foundation of the current Ritual. On 17 June 1614, Paul V authorized the first edition of the official Rituale Romanum by the Constitution Apostolicae Sedis. In this, he pointed out that Clement VIII had already issued a uniform text of the Pontificale Romanum and the Caeremoniale Episcoporum. "It remained", the Pope continued, "that the sacred and authentic rites of the Church, to be observed in the administration of sacraments and other ecclesiastical functions by those who have the care of souls, should also be included in one book and published by authority of the Apostolic See; so that they should carry out their office according to a public and fixed standard, instead of following so great a multitude of Rituals".

=== Post-Tridentine uniformity ===
But, unlike the other books of the Roman Rite, the Ritual has never been imposed as the only standard. Pope Paul V did not abrogate all other collections of the same kind or command only the use of his book. He stated: "Wherefore we exhort in the Lord" that it should be used. The result was that the old local rituals were never altogether abrogated. After the appearance of the Roman edition these others were gradually conformed to it. They continued to be used, but had many of their prayers and ceremonies modified to agree with the Roman edition. This applies especially to the rites of Baptism, Holy Communion, the form of absolution, and Extreme Unction. The ceremonies also contained in the Missal (benediction of holy water, the processions of Candlemas and Palm Sunday, etc.), and the prayers in the Breviary (e. g. the Office of the Dead) are necessarily identical with those of Paul V's Ritual; these have the absolute authority of the Missal and Breviary. On the other hand, many nations preserved local customs for the celebration of the Sacrament of Matrimony, visitation of the sick, special benedictions, processions, and sacramentals not found in the Roman edition and still printed in various diocesan rituals. It is then by no means the case that every priest of the Roman Rite used the Ritual. Very many dioceses or provinces still had their local handbooks under the name of Rituale, Ordo Administrandi Sacramenta, etc., though all of these conformed to the Roman texts in the principal elements. Most contained practically all the rituals of the Roman edition, along with local additions or supplements.

=== 18th–20th centuries ===
Pope Benedict XIV in 1752 revised the Roman Ritual, together with the Pontificale Romanum and Cærimoniale Episcoporum. His new editions of these three books were published by the brief Quam ardenti of 25 March 1752, which quoted Pope Paul V's constitution at length and was printed, as far as it concerns this book, in the beginning of the Ritual. He added to Paul V's text two forms for giving the Papal blessing (V, 6 and VIII, 31). Meanwhile, a great number of additional blessings were added in an appendix. This appendix grew nearly as long as the original book. Under the title Benedictionale Romanum it is often issued separately. Pope Leo XIII approbated an editio typica published by Pustet in Ratisbon in 1884. In 1925, the Holy See under the authority of Pope Pius XI issued another typical edition of the Ritual, which, as the decree of the Sacred Congregation of Rites of 10 June 1925 explained, had been adapted to the norms and guidelines of the Codex Juris Canonici of 1917, and the revised rubrics of the Missal and Breviary.

The latest typical edition of the Ritual was published in 1952.

=== 1969 to present ===
With the advent of the Second Vatican Council the Ritual was divided into different fascicles and revised, with each fascicle being published as a single volume from 1969 onward. They are prefaced with theological introductions and their translation into vernacular languages is overseen by the Episcopal Conferences. The current authoritative Latin editions are:

- Ordo celebrandi Matrimonium (Typis Polyglottis Vaticanis, editio typica 1969; editio typica altera 1991, 2008)
- Ordo Exsequiarum (Typis Polyglottis Vaticanis, 1969)
- Ordo Unctionis infirmorum eorumque pastoralis curae (Typis Polyglottis Vaticanis, 1972)
- Ordo Initiationis Christianae adultorum (Typis Polyglottis Vaticanis, 1972)
- Ordo professionis religiosae (Typis Polyglottis Vaticanis, 1970, 1975)
- Ordo Baptismi parvulorum (Typis Polyglottis Vaticanis, editio typica 1969; editio typica altera 1973, 1986, 2003)
- De sacra communione et de cultu mysterii eucharistici extra Missam (Typis Polyglottis Vaticanis, 1974)
- Ordo Paenitentiae (Typis Polyglottis Vaticanis, 1974)
- Ordo Confirmationis (Typis Polyglottis Vaticanis, editio typica 1973, 2003)
- De Benedictionibus (Typis Polyglottis Vaticanis, editio typica 1984, 1985, 1993, 2013)
- De Exorcismis et supplicationibus quibusdam (Typis Polyglottis Vaticanis, 1999, 2013)

The second section of the Ritual, the Benedictionale, was also extensively revised and published in 1987 as De Benedictionibus.

The Rite of Exorcism also underwent a series of revisions and was finally promulgated in 1999 as De exorcismis et supplicationibus quibusdam (Concerning Exorcisms and Certain Supplications).

== Contents ==
The Rituale Romanum is divided into ten "titles" (tituli). In each title (except I and X), the first chapter gives the general rules for the sacrament or function, while the others give the exact ceremonies and prayers for various cases of administration.

The text covers the sacraments of baptism, confirmation, eucharist, penance, anointing of the sick, matrimony, and priesthood. It also covers liturgy for the faithful departed, blessings (of special days, feasts, persons, animals, places, and things), processions, and exorcism.

== Other rituals ==
The Ambrosian Rite has its own ritual (Rituale Ambrosianum, published by Giacomo Agnelli at the Archiepiscopal Press, Milan).

In the Byzantine Rite, the contents of the ritual are contained in the Euchologion.

The Armenians have a ritual book (Mashdotz) similar to the Roman Ritual.

Other churches not in communion with the Holy See have not yet arranged the various parts of this book in one collection. Nearly all the Eastern Catholic Churches, however, now have ritual books formed on the Roman model.

== See also ==
- Breviary
- Pontifical
- Missal
- Vade retro satana
