= André Mocquereau =

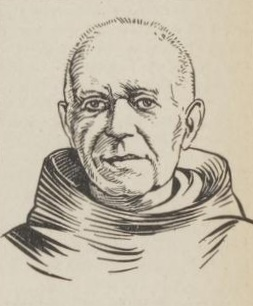
André Mocquereau

André Mocquereau (6 June 1849 – 18 January 1930) was a French monk at Solesmes Abbey, Gregorian musicologist, who had a great influence on the restoration of Gregorian chant thanks to his musical ability.

His scientific studies resulted in the use of the édition néo-médicéenne being ended at the Vatican in 1901.

== Publications ==
- 1908: Le nombre musical grégorien ou rythmique grégorienne — théorie et pratique —, tome I, Société de Saint-Jean-l'Évangéliste ainsi que Desclée & Cie., Rome et Tournai, 430 p. Read online
- 1927: Le nombre musical grégorien ou rythmique grégorienne, théorie et pratique, tome II, Desclée, Paris, 855 p.

== See also ==
- Solesmes Abbey,
- Gregorian chant
- Liber usualis

== Bibliography ==
- Études grégoriennes, tome XXVIII, Abbaye Saint-Pierre, Solesmes 2011
- Pierre Combe, Justine Ward and Solesmes, translation by Philipe and Guillemine de Lacoste, The Catholic University of America Press, Washington 1987, 410 p. Read online
- Daniel Walden (Harvard University), Dom Mocquereau's Theories of Rhythm and Romantic Musical Aesthetics, 2015 (initialement présentée dans les Études grégoriennes, tome XLII, 2015) Read online
