= Graduale Simplex =

Catholic religious chant

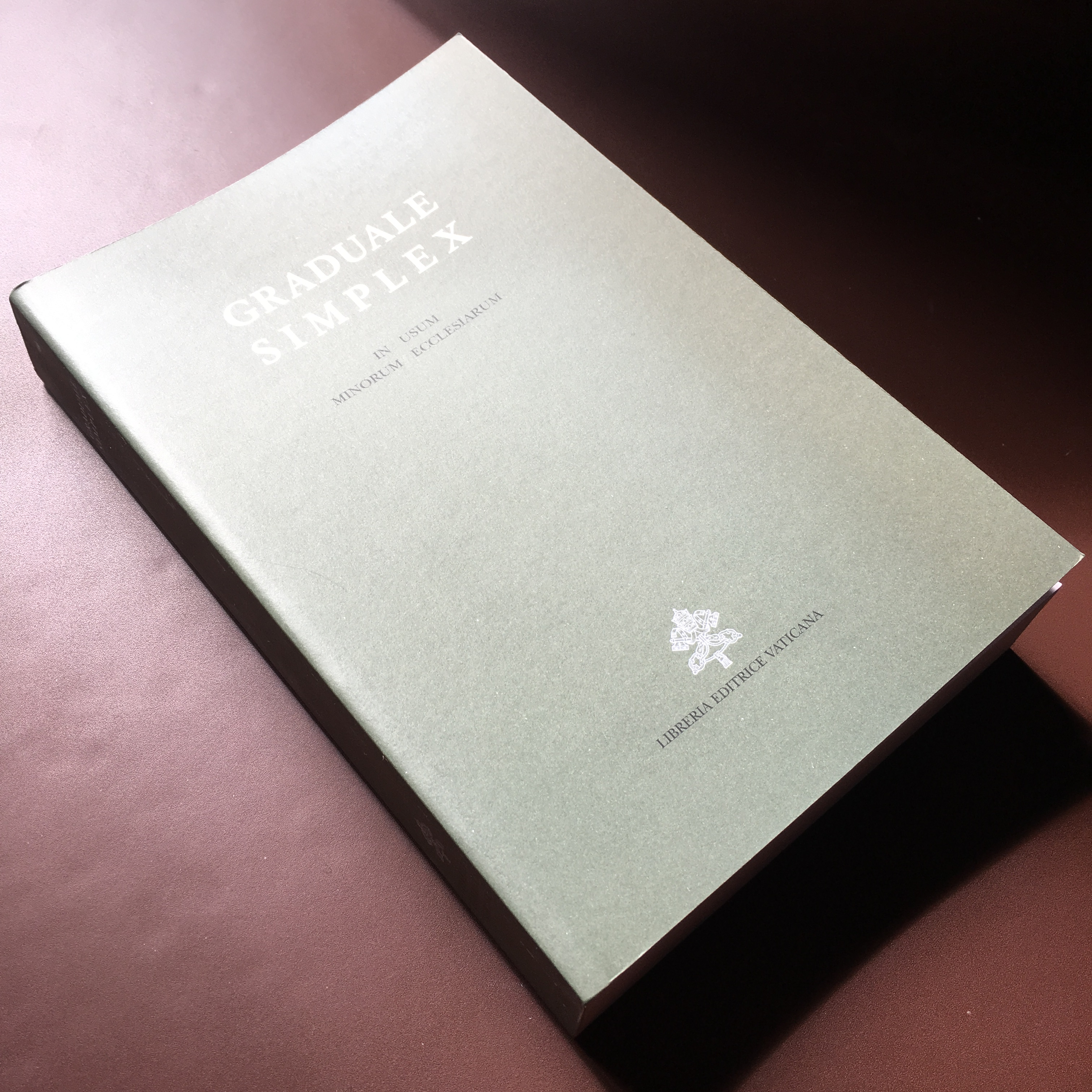
Graduale simplex

Graduale simplex ("Simple Gradual") is a gradual in Latin and in Gregorian chant, published by the Vatican in 1967 following the Second Vatican Council, so that the use of Gregorian chant can adapt to smaller parishes and churches or to those who lack experienced choirs.

Its full title is Graduale simplex in usum minorum ecclesiarum (simple gradual for the use of small churches).

== Constitution on liturgy ==
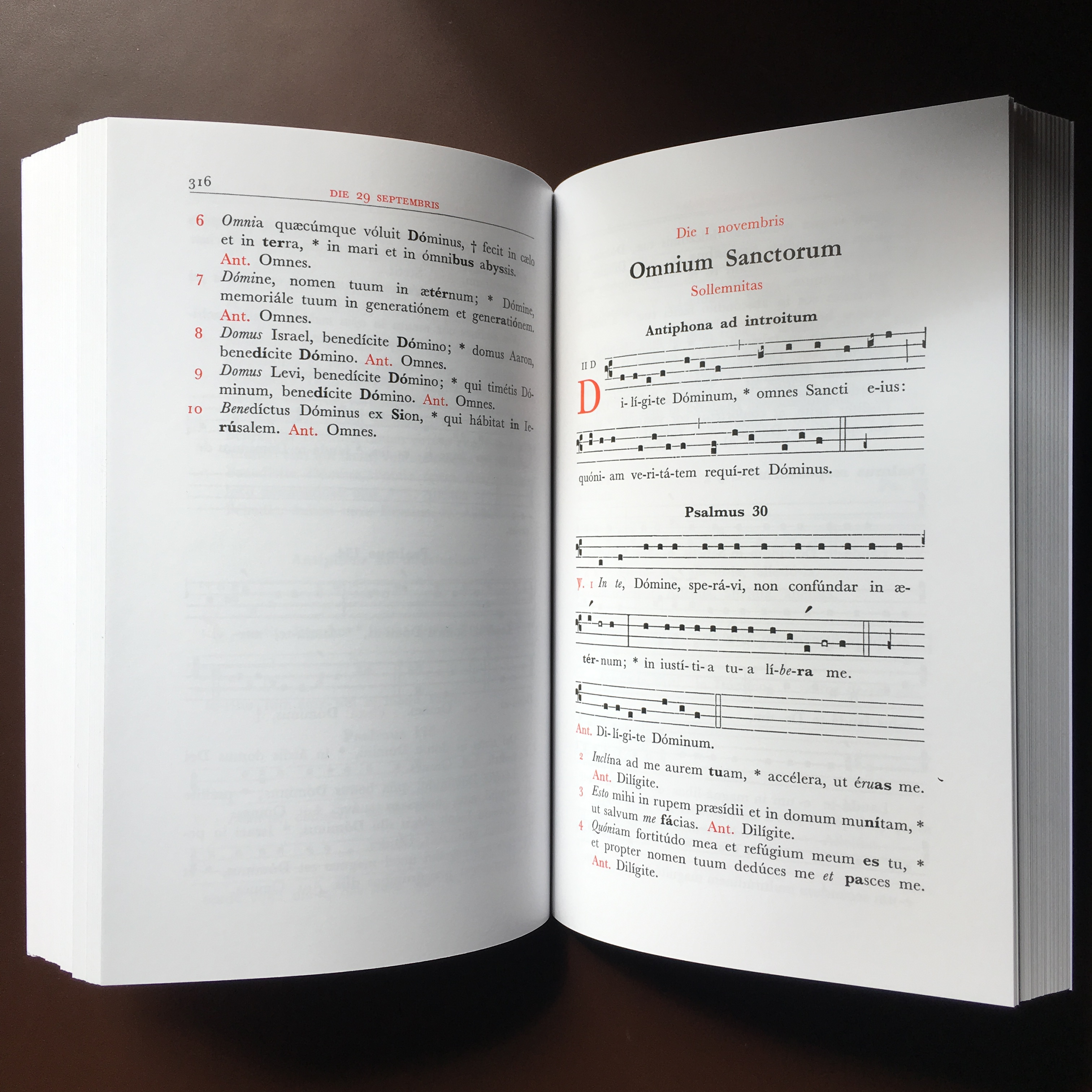
Solemnity of All Saints, in the Graduale simplex

The publication of the first edition of the Graduale simplex was achieved in 1967, as a reworking of the Gregorian chant book in order to satisfy the Sacrosanctum Concilium Constitution of 4 December 1963, following the Second Vatican Council.

The typical edition of the books of Gregorian chant is to be completed; and a more critical edition is to be prepared of those books already published since the restoration by St. Pius X.

It is desirable also that an edition be prepared containing simpler melodies, for use in small churches.

— Constitution on the sacred liturgy, article 117 (1963)

== History ==
There have been two editions of the Graduale Simplex : the first was published by the Holy See in 1967. The second, revised and definitive edition, was published in 1975 and has been re-printed since then.

The Graduale simplex in its definitive edition includes the Kyriale simplex, as well as some famous hymns: Te Deum, Veni Creator, Te decet laus, etc.

== Editions ==
- Graduale simplex in usum minorum ecclesiarum, 1st edition, Vatican 1967.
- Graduale simplex in usum minorum ecclesiarum, 2nd edition, Libreria editrice Vaticana, Vatican 1975, ISBN 978-88-209-1603-9 515 p.
