= Kyrie =

Common name of a Christian liturgical prayer

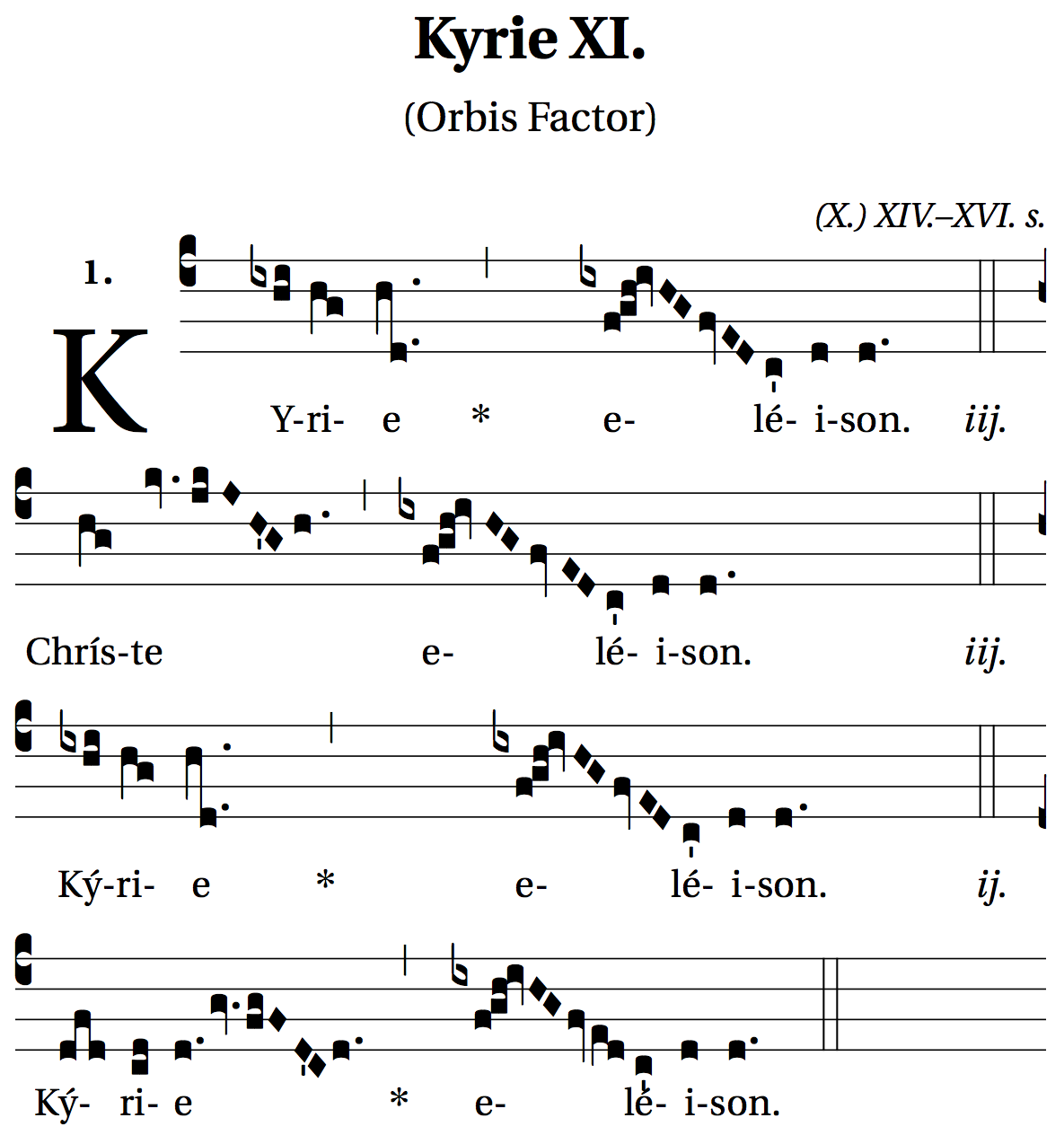
Kyrie XI ("orbis factor")—a fairly ornamented setting of the Kyrie in Gregorian chant—from the Liber Usualis

Kyrie, a transliteration of Greek Κύριε, vocative case of Κύριος (Kyrios), is a common name of an important prayer of Christian liturgy, also called the Kyrie eleison (/ˈkɪri.eɪ ɛˈleɪ.isɒn/ KEER-ee-ay el-AY-eess-on; Ancient Greek: Κύριε ἐλέησον, romanized: Kýrie eléēson, lit. 'Lord have mercy').

== In the Bible ==
The prayer, Kýrie, eléison, "Lord, have mercy" derives from a Biblical phrase. Greek ἐλέησόν με κύριε, 'have mercy on me, Lord', is the Septuagint translation of the phrase חָנֵּנִי יְהוָה often found in the Psalms (6:2, 9:13, 31:9, 86:3, and 123:3).

In the New Testament, the Greek phrase occurs three times in Matthew:

- Matthew 15:22: the Canaanite woman cries out to Jesus, "Have mercy on me, O Lord, Son of David." (Ἐλέησόν με κύριε υἱὲ Δαβίδ)
- Matthew 17:15: "Lord, have mercy on my son" (Κύριε ἐλέησόν μου τὸν υἱόν)
- Matthew 20:30: two unnamed blind men call out to Jesus, "Lord, have mercy on us, Son of David." (Ἐλέησον ἡμᾶς κύριε υἱὸς Δαβίδ)

In the Parable of the Publican and the Pharisee (Luke 18:9–14) the despised tax collector who cries out "Lord have mercy on me, a sinner" is contrasted with the smug Pharisee who believes he has no need for forgiveness.

Luke 17:13 has epistates, 'master', instead of kyrios, 'lord', (Ἰησοῦ ἐπιστάτα ἐλέησον ἡμᾶς), being less suggestive of the kyrios 'lord' used as euphemism for YHWH in the Septuagint.

There are other examples in the text of the gospels without the kyrie 'lord', e.g. Mark 10:46, where blind Bartimaeus cries out, "Jesus, Son of David, have mercy on me."

In the biblical text, the phrase is always personalized by an explicit object (such as "on me", "on us", "on my son"), while in the Eucharistic celebration it can be seen more as a general expression of confidence in God's love.

== In Eastern Christianity ==
The phrase Kýrie, eléison (Ancient Greek: Κύριε, ἐλέησον), whether in Greek or in other languages, is one of the most oft-repeated phrases in Eastern Christianity, including the Eastern Orthodox, Oriental Orthodox, Assyrian, and Eastern Catholic Churches. The Greek phrase, Kýrie, eléison, is for instance extensively used in the Coptic (Egyptian) Christian liturgy, which uses both the Coptic and the Greek languages.

The various litanies, frequent in Eastern Orthodox rites, generally have Lord, have mercy as their response, either singly or triply. Some petitions in these litanies will have twelve or even forty repetitions of the phrase as a response.

The phrase is also the origin of the Jesus Prayer, beloved by Eastern Christians as a foundation of personal prayer, and is increasingly popular among some Western Christians.

The prayer is simultaneously a petition and a prayer of thanksgiving; an acknowledgement of what God has done, what God is doing, and what God will continue to do. It is refined in the Parable of the Pharisee and the Publican (Luke 18:9–14), where the Publican prays "God, have mercy on me, a sinner", thus showing more clearly its connection with the Jesus Prayer.

== In Western Christianity ==
Kyrie from the Gregorian Mass XI

In Rome, the liturgy was first celebrated in Greek. Josef Jungmann suggests the Kyrie in the Roman Mass is best seen as a vestige of an opening litany like those in some Eastern churches, which was retained even after Latin became normative. The Kyrie is positioned after the Prayer of Thanksgiving in the Lutheran Mass.

As early as the sixth century, Pope Gregory the Great noted that there were differences in the way in which Eastern and Western churches sang the Kyrie. In the Eastern churches it is sung in unison by those present, whereas in the Western church the clergy sing and the people respond. Also, the Western church would sing Christe, eléison as many times as Kýrie, eléison. In the Roman Rite liturgy, the variant Christe, eléison, is a transliteration of Greek, Χριστέ, ἐλέησον.

Kýrie, eléison may also be used as a response of the people to intentions mentioned in the Prayer of the Faithful. Since 1549, Anglicans have normally sung or said the Kyrie in English. In the 1552 Book of Common Prayer, the Kyrie was inserted into a recitation of the Ten Commandments. Modern revisions of the Prayer Book have restored the option of saying the Kyrie without the Commandments. Other denominations, such as Methodism, also use the Kyrie in their liturgies.

=== Kyrie as section of the Mass ordinary ===
In the Tridentine Mass form of the Roman Rite, Kýrie, eléison is sung or said three times, followed by a threefold Christe, eléison and by another threefold Kýrie, eléison. Collectively, the nine invocations are said to unite the petitions of the faithful to those of the nine choirs of angels in heaven.

==== Text ====
Kýrie, eléison (Κύριε, ἐλέησον)

'Lord, have mercy'

Christe, eléison (Χριστέ, ἐλέησον)

'Christ, have mercy'

==== Musical settings ====
The Kyrie is the first sung prayer of the Mass ordinary and is usually part of any musical setting of the Mass, one exception being the early English school, whose liturgy featured a troped Kyrie that was therefore proper to the day. Kyrie movements sometimes have a ternary (ABA) musical structure that reflects the symmetrical structure of the text. Polyphonic settings can be found in five (or four) movements, calling for alternatim performance, i. e. alternating with Gregorian chant or with organ versets. Musical settings exist in a variety of styles.

=== In litanies ===
Reflecting its original liturgical function, the Kyrie is the standard beginning for public and private litanies in the Roman Rite, such as the Litany of the Saints or the Litany of the Blessed Virgin Mary.

== Modern Catholic thought ==
The terms aggiornamento (bringing up to date) and ressourcement (light of the Gospel) figure significantly into the documents of Vatican II: "The Church carries the responsibility of scrutinizing the signs of the times and interpreting them in the light of the Gospel" (Gaudium et spes, 4). Louis Bouyer, a theologian at Vatican II, claimed that there was a distortion of the Eucharistic spirit of the Mass over the centuries, so that "one could find merely traces of the original sense of the Eucharist as a thanksgiving for the wonders God has wrought." The General Instruction of the Roman Missal (GIRM) notes that at the Council of Trent "manuscripts in the Vatican ... by no means made it possible to inquire into 'ancient and approved authors' farther back than the liturgical commentaries of the Middle Ages ... [But] traditions dating back to the first centuries, before the formation of the rites of East and West, are better known today because of the discovery of so many liturgical documents" (7f.).

Consonant with these modern studies, theologians have suggested that there be a continuity in praise of God between the opening song and the praise of the Gloria. This is explained by Mark R. Francis of Catholic Theological Union in Chicago, speaking of the Kyrie:

Its emphasis is not on us (our sinfulness) but on God’s mercy and salvific action in Jesus Christ. It could just as accurately be translated "O Lord, you are merciful!" Note that the sample tropes all mention what Christ has done for us, not how we have sinned. For example, "you were sent to heal the contrite," "you have shown us the way to the Father," or "you come in word and sacrament to strengthen us in holiness," leading to further acclamation of God’s praises in the Gloria.

In this same line, Hans Urs von Balthasar calls for a renewal of the focus at the Eucharist:

We must make every effort to arouse the sense of community within the liturgy, to restore liturgy to the ecclesial plane, where individuals can take their proper place in it…. Liturgical piety involves a total turning from concern with one’s inner state to the attitude and feeling of the Church. It means enlarging the scope of prayer, so often narrow and selfish, to embrace the concerns of the whole Church and, indeed – as in the Our Father – of God."

In the New Dictionary of Sacramental Worship, the need to establish communion is reinforced as it quotes the GIRM to the effect that the purpose of the introductory rites is "to ensure that the faithful who come together as one establish communion and dispose themselves to listen properly to God's word and to celebrate the Eucharist worthily" (GIRM, 46, emphasis added).

== See also ==
- Jesus Prayer
- Kyriacos
- List of Greek phrases
