= Editio typica =

Official original text of documents of the Catholic Church

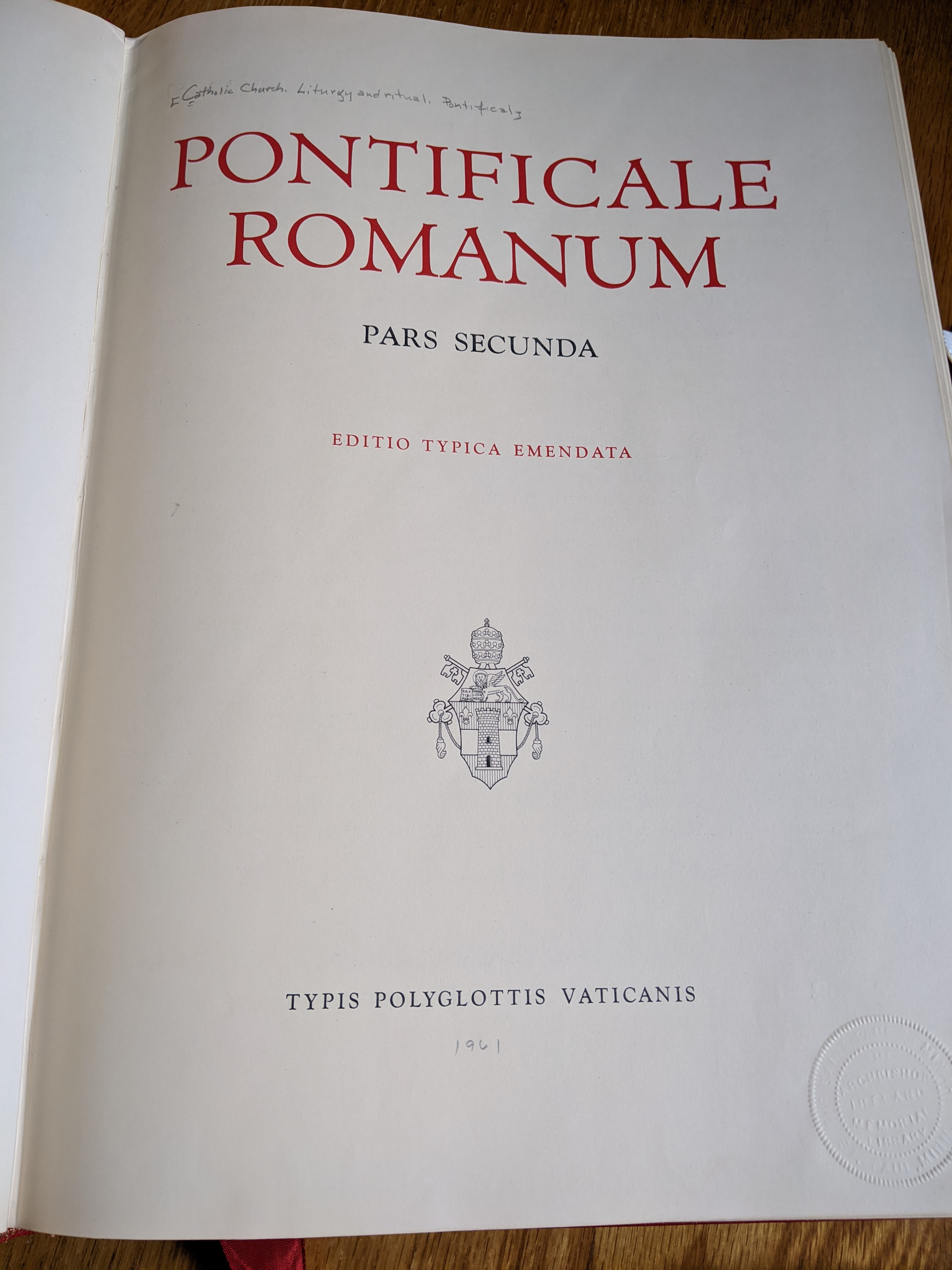
Tridentine Pontificale Romanum from 1961

An editio typica (Latin for typical edition) is a form of text used in the Catholic Church as an official source text of a particular document—typically in Ecclesiastical Latin—and used as the basis for all subsequent translations into vernacular languages.
