= Ordines Romani =

Rubrics for liturgical services

The Ordines Romani (Latin for Roman Orders, singular Ordo Romanus) are collections of documents that are the rubrics for various liturgical services, including the early Medieval Mass, of the Roman Rite. There are about 50 recognized Ordines Romani.

They span many centuries throughout the Middle Ages.

The rubrics for the Mass are found in Ordo I, VII, IX-X, XV-XVII.

Those for Baptism are found in Ordo XI, XXII-XXIV and XXV.

Those for Ordination are found in Ordo XXXIV-XXXV, and XXXIX.

Those for Funerals are found in Ordo XLIV.

Finally, those provisions that deal with the Dedications of Churches are found in Ordo XLI-XLIII.

The oldest is Ordo XI which is from around AD 650 and concerns Baptism.

The current critical edition of the Ordines Romani is Les ordines romani du haut moyen age (1961) edited by Michel Andrieu.

== Sources ==
- Herbermann, Charles, ed. (1913). "Ordines Romani" . Catholic Encyclopedia. New York: Robert Appleton Company.
