= Kyriale =

Collection of Gregorian chant settings

Gregorian chant setting for Kyrie XI notated in neumes.

The Kyriale is a collection of Gregorian chant settings for the Ordinary of the Mass. It contains eighteen Masses (each consisting of the Kyrie, Gloria [excluded from Masses intended for weekdays/ferias and Sundays in Advent and Lent], Sanctus, and Agnus Dei), six Credos, and several ad libitum chants. This collection is included in liturgical books such as the Graduale Romanum and Liber Usualis, and is also published as a separate book by the monks of Solesmes Abbey.

In the Kyriale, the individual chants of the Ordinary are grouped into complete sets, whose title usually indicates the opening of the prosula formerly sung to each respective Kyrie melody. These Masses are followed by individual items not grouped with the complete Masses.

A shorter Kyriale is included in the second edition of the Graduale Simplex.

== Contents ==
The following list of Masses indicates the seasons or feasts for which each Mass is intended. In practice, however, Mass settings may be used on days that fall outside the seasons or feasts listed below; additionally, chants may be extracted from multiple Mass settings for use during a given Mass.

For most Mass settings, the seasonal/festal classification is listed as follows: as practiced prior to the 1955 liturgical reforms of Pope Pius XII/as practiced under the 1960 Code of Rubrics of Pope John XXIII/as practiced following the liturgical reforms of Pope Paul VI.

- Asperges me (for the Asperges rite outside of Paschaltide)
- Vidi aquam (for the Asperges rite in Paschaltide)
- Mass I: Lux et Origo (in Paschaltide)
- Mass II: Kyrie Fons Bonitatis (for solemn feasts [doubles of the I or II class]/I class feasts/solemnities)
- Mass III: Kyrie Deus Sempiterne (for solemn feasts [doubles of the I or II class]/I class feasts/solemnities)
- Mass IV: Cunctipotens Genitor Deus (for doubles/II class feasts/feasts of apostles)
- Mass V: Kyrie Magnae Deus Potentiae (for doubles/II class feasts/feasts)
- Mass VI: Kyrie Rex Genitor (for doubles/II class feasts/feasts)
- Mass VII: Kyrie Rex Splendens (for doubles/II class feasts/feasts)
- Mass VIII: De Angelis (for doubles/II class feasts/feasts)
- Mass IX: Cum Júbilo (for Marian feasts/Marian solemnities and feasts)
- Mass X: Alme Pater (for Marian feasts/Marian feasts and memorials)
- Mass XI: Orbis Fáctor (for Sundays per annum [i.e., after Epiphany and Pentecost]/Sundays)
- Mass XII: Pater Cuncta (for semi-doubles/III class feasts/memorials)
- Mass XIII: Stelliferi Conditor Orbis (for semi-doubles/III class feasts/memorials)
- Mass XIV: Jesu Redemptor (for within octaves not of the Blessed Virgin/III class feasts/memorials)
- Mass XV: Dominator Deus (for simples/commemorations and ferias in Christmastide/ferias)
- Mass XVI: (for ferias per annum/ferias during Ordinary Time)
- Mass XVII: Salve (for Sundays in Advent and Lent)
- Mass XVIII: Deus Genitor Alme (ferias in Advent and Lent, for vigil Masses, Ember days, and Rogation days/for ferias in Advent and Lent)
- Credo I–VI
- Cantus ad libitum
  - Kyrie (I–XI)
  - Gloria (I–IV)
  - Sanctus (I–III)
  - Agnus Dei (I–II)
- Missa pro defunctis (for requiem Masses)

== Bibliography and external links ==
- http://www.christusrex.org/www2/cantgreg/kyriale_eng.html
- http://www.ccwatershed.org/kyriale/
- http://www.sanctamissa.org/en/music/gregorian-chant/the-faithful/kyriale-solesmes.html
- http://www.gregorian-chant.info/kyriale.html
- http://www.oxfordreference.com/view/10.1093/acref/9780192802903.001.0001/acref-9780192802903-e-3901
- http://www.chantcafe.com/2011/04/kyriale-simplex-hidden-treasure.html
