= Popule meus (Victoria) =

Motet by Tomás Luis de Victoria

- Motet by Tomás Luis de Victoria
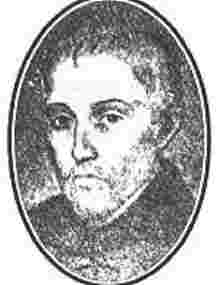
- The composer
- Text: from Improperia, including Trisagion
- Language: Latin
- Published: 1585: Rome
- Scoring: SATB choir

Popule meus (My people) is a motet for Good Friday by Tomás Luis de Victoria. He set a liturgical text from the Improperia, which contains the Greek-Latin Trisagion, prescribed for use in the Catholic responsory for Good Friday. It begins "Popule meus, quid feci tibi?" (My people, what have I done to you?). The composition, scored for four voices, SATB, was published in Rome in 1585 in Officium Hebdomadae Sanctae (Office of the Holy Week).

== History, text and music ==
Victoria, a late Renaissance Spanish composer, set a liturgical text from the Improperia (Reproaches) prescribed for the Catholic liturgy on Good Friday. Victoria set two refrains, one from the ninth century, worded as if Jesus on the Cross addressed his people: "Popule meus, quid feci tibi?" (My people, what have I done to you?), the other the Trisagion (in Greek, "thrice holy") and its Latin translation. The refrains are used during the Veneration of the Cross in the liturgy, chanted by two choirs in antiphonal singing, one singing the Greek, the other one the Latin. The Greek text is the only remnant in Greek in the Roman liturgy besides the Kyrie eleison.

The composition was published by Alessandro Gardane in Rome in 1585 as No. 27 of the collection Officium Hebdomadae Sanctae (Office of the Holy Week). It is scored for four voices, SATB. Victoria's setting of the two refrains has been described as "of compelling beauty" and "music of great expressiveness", achieved by simple harmonies, mostly in homophony.

== Recording ==
The motet has been recorded often, as part of different collections. A 1996 recording offers music by Victoria, including his Missa Dum Complerentur, sung by the Westminster Cathedral Choir, conducted by James O'Donnell. A 2004 collection offers the motet as part of music from the time of the reign of Philip II of Spain, performed by Musica Ficta. A 2015 recording presents it as part of music from the Papal Sistine Chapel, performed by the Sistine Chapel Choir, conducted by Massimo Palombella.

== Literature ==
- Cramer, E. C. (1973). The Officium Hebdomadae Sanctae of Tomás Luis de Victoria (Doctoral dissertation). Boston University.
