= Seven bow beginning =

Seven bow beginning is a customary beginning of prayers used by believers of Byzantine Rite when praying alone. This beginning is prayed just before one starts to pray any other private prayers.

It consists of seven parts. It begins with the prayer of the publican and contains also some other short prayers - e.g. to Theotokos and guardian angel. The structure of the seven bow beginning is as follows: "O God, be merciful...", "O God, cleanse me...", "Having created...", "I have sinned...", "My sovereign, most holy...", "O Angel, my holy Guardian..." and "Holy Apostle...". After each of these short prayers a bow is made.

This beginning can be found e. g. in the order for reading canons and akathists when alone.

Old Believers use a different form of seven bow beginning which uses another wording. The Old Believer version actually contains eight bows, with the last one being done without making the sign of the cross.

== See also ==
- Usual beginning
