= Tersanctus =

Tersanctus or Ter Sanctus (Latin for Thrice Holy) may refer to:

- "Sanctus" or Epinikios Hymnos, a hymn from Christian liturgy
- "Trisagion" or Agios O Theos, a standard hymn of the Divine Liturgy in most of the Eastern Orthodox, Oriental Orthodox and Eastern Catholic churches
