= Akathist =

Liturgical hymn of Eastern Churches

An Akathist, akaphist or Acathist Hymn (Greek: Ἀκάθιστος Ὕμνος, "unseated hymn") is a type of hymn usually recited by Eastern Orthodox and Byzantine Catholic Christians, dedicated to a saint, holy event, or one of the persons of the Holy Trinity. The name derives from the fact that during the chanting of the hymn, or sometimes the whole service, the congregation is expected to remain standing in reverence, without sitting down (ἀ-, a-, "without, not" and κάθισις, káthisis, "sitting"), except for the aged or infirm.

The Akathist is also known by the first three words of its prooimion (preamble), Têi hypermáchōi strategôi (Τῇ ὑπερμάχῳ στρατηγῷ, "To you, invincible champion") addressed to Holy Mary (Panagia Theotokos, "The all-holy birth-giver of God").

During Byzantine Catholic and Orthodox Christian religious services in general, sitting, standing, bowing and the making of prostrations are set by an intricate set of rules, as well as individual discretion. Only during readings of the Gospel, the reading of the Six Psalms during Matins, and the singing of Akathists is standing considered mandatory for all.

== Origin and history ==
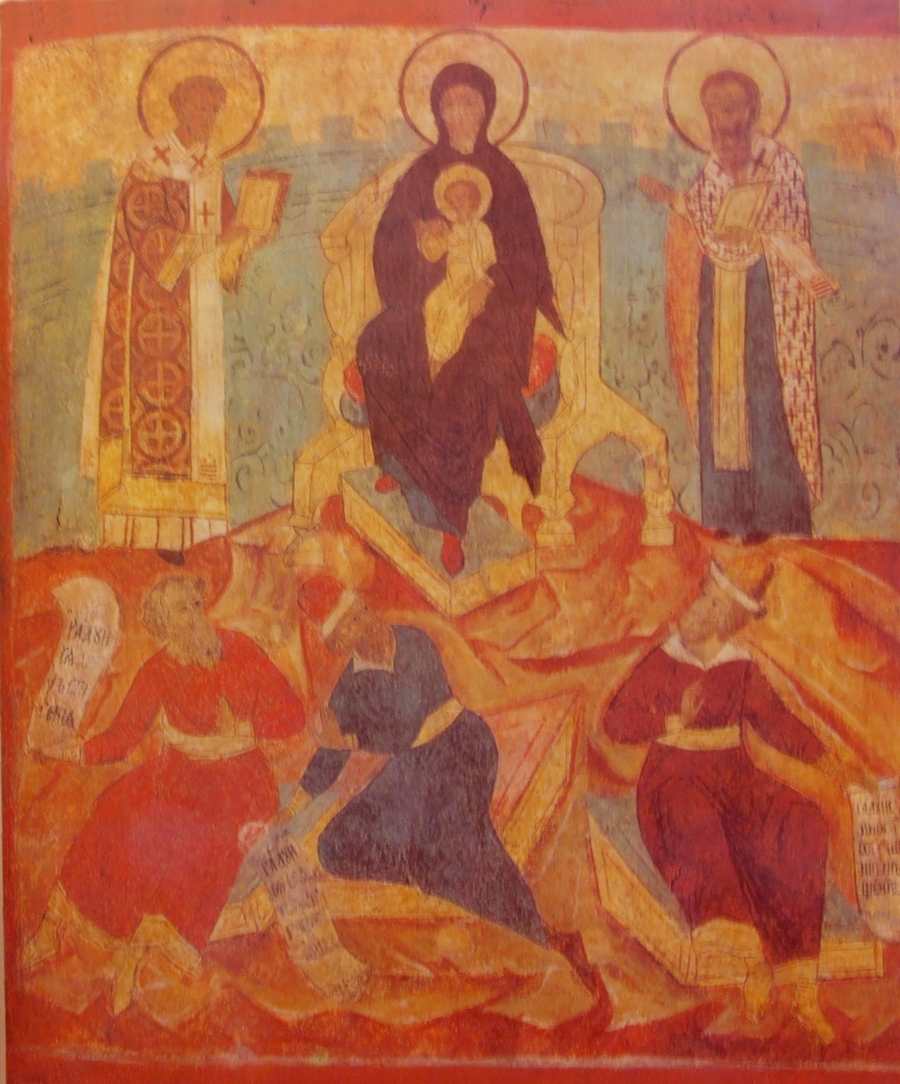
Icon of the Akathist of the Theotokos. Fresco detail, 1644. Church of the Deposition of the Robe of the Mother of God, Moscow Kremlin.

The akathist par excellence is the one written for the feast of Annunciation of the Theotokos (25 March). This kontakion was traditionally attributed to Romanos the Melodist since kontakia of Romanos dominated the classical repertoire of 80 kontakia sung during the cathedral rite of the Hagia Sophia, though recent scholarship rejects this authorship like in cases of many other kontakia of the core repertoire. According to the synaxary the origin of the feast is assigned by the Synaxarion to the year 626, when Constantinople, in the reign of Heraclius, was attacked by the Persians and Avars but saved through the intervention of the Most Holy Theotokos. "From that time, therefore, the Church, in memory of so great and so divine a miracle, desired this day to be a feast in honour of the Mother of God ... and called it Acathistus" (Synaxarion). This origin is disputed by Sophocles on the grounds that the hymn could not have been composed in one day, and its twenty-four oikoi contain no allusion to such an event and therefore could not have been composed to commemorate it. However the feast may have originated, the Synaxarion commemorates two other victories, under Leo III the Isaurian, and Constantine Pogonatus, similarly ascribed to the intervention of the Theotokos.

No certain ascription of its authorship can be made. It has been attributed to Patriarch Sergius I of Constantinople, whose pious activities the Synaxarion commemorates in great detail. J.M. Quercius (1777) assigns it to George Pisida, deacon, archivist, and sacristan of Hagia Sophia whose poems find an echo both in style and in theme in the Akathist; the elegance, antithetic and balanced style, the vividness of the narrative, the flowers of poetic imagery being all very suggestive of his work. His position as sacristan would naturally suggest such a tribute to the Theotokos, as the hymn only gives more elaborately the sentiments condensed into two epigrams of Pisida found in her church at Blachernae. Quercius also argues that words, phrases, and sentences of the hymn are to be found in the poetry of Pisida. Leclercq finds nothing absolutely demonstrative in such a comparison and offers a suggestion which may possibly help to a solution of the problem.

Before the turn of the 21st century, the origin of the Akathist was usually assigned to the 6th or 7th century but more recent scholarship, driven by the work of Leena Peltomaa, has argued for a 5th-century origin on the basis of theological content. Cunningham concurs with Peltomaa's analysis of the hymn's Christology but postulates, from its "highly developed poetic form" and elaborate invocations of Mary, a somewhat later provenance of the latter 5th/early 6th century. In contrast, Shoemaker reasons that "Peltomaa's [arguments] for dating the Akathist hymn to the period before Chalcedon would seem to apply equally if not even more so" for a collection of Marian hymns within the Georgian Chantbook of Jerusalem that he contends are of primarily pre-Chalcedonian authorship. Following Renoux he argues that the hymns, which are colourful and invocatory, contain theology closest to mid-5th century homilists, bearing witness to a highly developed cult of Mary at an earlier period than previous generations of scholars had appreciated. Reynolds summarises prevailing opinion as being in favour of a date for the Akathist "somewhere between the Councils of Epheus and Chalcedon." Similarly, Arentzen observes that most scholars now favour an early provenance.

Since the 14th century the Akathist moved from the menaion to the moveable cycle of the triodion, and the custom established that the whole hymn was sung in four sections throughout Lent. As such it became part of the service of the Salutations to the Theotokos (used in the Byzantine tradition during Great Lent).

== Structure ==
Apart from its usual dedication to the menaion and the early custom to celebrate kontakia during the Pannychis (festive night vigil celebrated at the Blachernae chapel), the Akathist had also the political function to celebrate military victories or to ask during wars for divine protection intermediated by prayers of the Theotokos. This function is reflected within the synaxarion.

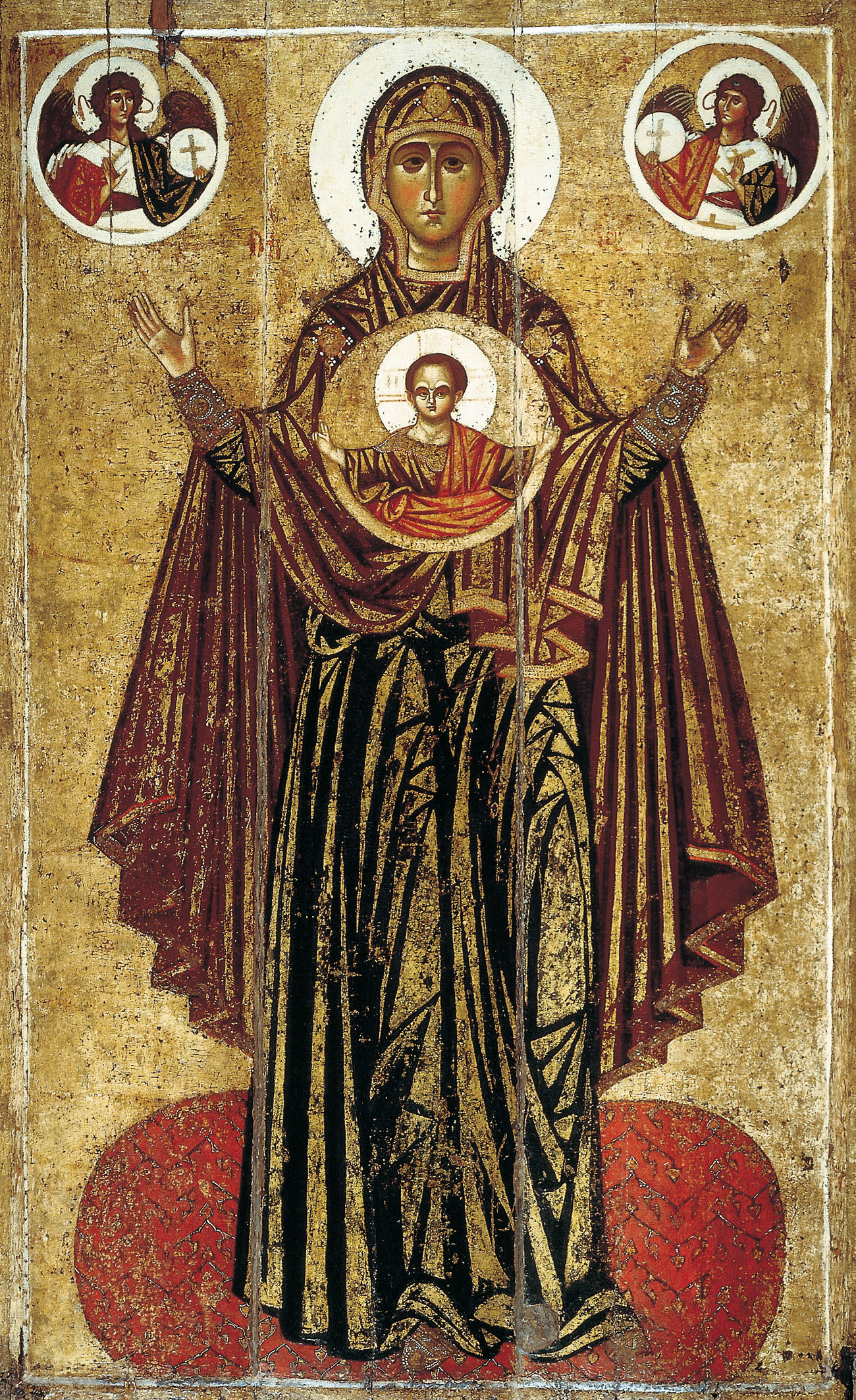
Icon of the Theotokos Orans from Spasky Cathedral in Yaroslavl (13th-century).

When an akathist is chanted by itself, the Usual beginning, a series of prayers which include the Trisagion (thrice-holy) is often said as a prelude to the akathist hymn. The akathist may also be included as a part of another service, such as Matins or a Molieben.

One of the exceptional features of this Akathist is its acrostic style; the Greek original consists of 24 oikoi, each one beginning with the next letter of the alphabet. Due to the excessive length the kontakion became truncated like the others, but even the earliest chant books with musical notation (the Tipografsky Ustav, for instance) have the complete text of all 24 oikoi written out, but the last 23 oikoi without musical notation. The hymn itself is divided into thirteen parts, each of which is composed of a kontakion and an oikos (Greek: οίκος, house, possibly derived from Syriac terminology). The kontakion usually ends with the exclamation: Alleluia, which is repeated by a choir in full settings or chanted by the reader in simple settings. Within the latter part of the oikos comes an anaphoric entreaty, such as Come or Rejoice.

For example, the Akathist to the Theotokos:

Kontakion One

Queen of the Heavenly Host, Defender of our souls, we thy servants offer to thee songs of victory and thanksgiving, for thou, O Mother of God, hast delivered us from dangers. But as thou hast invincible power, free us from conflicts of all kinds that we may cry to thee:

- Rejoice, unwedded Bride!
Oikos One

An Archangel was sent from Heaven to say to the Mother of God: Rejoice! And seeing Thee, O Lord, taking bodily form, he was amazed and with his bodiless voice he stood crying to her such things as these:

- Rejoice, thou through whom joy will flash forth!
- Rejoice, thou through whom the curse will cease!
- Rejoice, revival of fallen Adam!
- Rejoice, redemption of the tears of Eve!
- Rejoice, height hard to climb for human thoughts!
- Rejoice, depth hard to contemplate even for the eyes of Angels!
- Rejoice, thou who art the King's throne!
- Rejoice, thou who bearest Him Who bears all!
- Rejoice, star that causest the Sun to appear!
- Rejoice, womb of the divine incarnation!
- Rejoice, thou through whom creation becomes new!
- Rejoice, thou through whom the Creator becomes a babe!
- Rejoice, unwedded bride!

The thirteenth kontakion (which, unlike the preceding twelve, does not have a corresponding oikos) is usually followed by the repetition of the first oikos and kontakion. After the thirteen kontakia and oikoi, additional prayers are added, such as a troparion and another kontakion. The final kontakion is the famous "Tēi Hypermáchōi Stratēgōi" ("Unto the Defender General"), a hymn addressing Mary as the savior of Constantinople in the 626 siege:

Unto the Defender General the dues of victory,

and for the deliverance from woes, the thanksgiving

I, Thy city, ascribe Thee, O Theotokos.

And having your might unassailable,

deliver me from all danger

so that I may cry unto Thee:

Rejoice, O Bride unwedded.

Another characteristic feature of the Akathist is the extraordinary length of the refrain or ephymnion which consists of a great number of verses beginning with χαῖρε (“Rejoice”) which are called in Greek Chairetismoi (Χαιρετισμοί, "Rejoicings") or in Arabic Madayeh, respectively; in the Slavic tradition these are known as Khayretizmy (Хайретизмы). The chairetismoi are only repeated in every second oikos, and from a musical point of view the ephymnion consists just of a short musical phrase, either about the last χαῖρε verse or about allelouia.

== Various ways of celebration ==
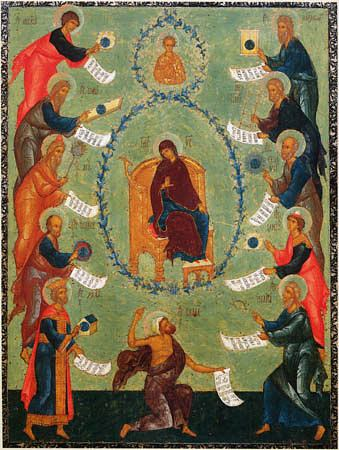
Detail of the icon of the Praises of the Theotokos, before which the Akathist may be chanted. The Theotokos is shown enthroned in the center, with Christ Emmanuel above her. To either side are shown the prophets who foretold the Incarnation. In the full icon, scenes from the life of the Virgin Mary surround this vignette.

When the word akathist is used alone, it most commonly refers to the original hymn by this name, the 6th century Akathist to the Theotokos. This hymn is often split into four parts and sung at the "Salutations to the Theotokos" service on the first four Friday evenings in Great Lent; the entire Akathist is then sung on the fifth Friday evening. Traditionally it is included in the Orthros (Matins) of the Fifth Saturday of Great Lent, which for this reason is known as the "Saturday of the Akathist". In monasteries of Athonite tradition, the whole Akathist is usually inserted nightly at Compline.

The four sections into which the Akathist is divided correspond to the themes of the Annunciation, Nativity, Christ, and the Theotokos herself.

The hymn itself forms an alphabetical acrostic—that is, each oikos begins with a letter of the Greek alphabet, in order—and it consists of twelve long and twelve short oikoi. Each of the long oikoi include a seven-line stanza followed by six couplets employing rhyme, assonance and alliteration, beginning with the greeting Chaíre and ending with the refrain, "Rejoice, Bride without bridegroom!" (also translated as "Rejoice, thou Bride unwedded!") In the short oikoi, the seven-line stanza is followed by the refrain, Alleluia.

The Salutations to the Theotokos service, often known by its Greek name, the Χαιρετισμοί/Chairetismoí (from the Χαίρε/Chaíre! so often used in the hymn), consists of Compline with the Akathist hymn inserted. It is known in Arabic as the Madayeh.

=== Salutations of the Theotokos ===
==== On the First Four Fridays of Lent ====
- Usual Beginning
- Psalms 50, 69 and 142
- Small Doxology
- Nicene Creed
- It is truly meet
- Canon to the Mother of God
- Kontakion: "To Thee the Champion Leader"
- Portion of the Akathist:
  - First Friday: Ikos 1-Kontakion 4
  - Second Friday: Ikos 4-Kontakion 7
  - Third Friday: Ikos 7-Kontakion 10
  - Fourth Friday: Ikos 10-Kontakion 13 (+ Ikos 1)
- Kontakion: "To Thee the Champion Leader"
- Trisagion Prayers
- Kontakion:
  - First Friday: St Theodore the Recruit
  - Other Fridays: Martyrs
- Prayers to the Theotokos, Christ and the Holy Trinity
- First Friday only: Gospel: John 15:1–7
- Dismissal
- Mutual forgiveness
- Litany: "Let us pray for the peace of the world"
- Sessional Hymn: "Gabriel stood amazed"

==== On the Fifth Friday of Lent (Greek parish use) ====
- Usual Beginning
- Psalms 50, 69 and 142
- Small Doxology
- Nicene Creed
- It is truly meet
- Troparion: "Taking knowledge of the secret command" (thrice)
- Kontakion: "To Thee the Champion Leader"
- Ikos 1-Kontakion 4
- Kontakion: "To Thee the Champion Leader"
- Canon to the Theotokos Odes 1 & 3
- Kontakion: "To Thee the Champion Leader"
- Ikos 4-Kontakion 7
- Kontakion: "To Thee the Champion Leader"
- Canon to the Theotokos Odes 4–6
- Kontakion: "To Thee the Champion Leader"
- Ikos 7-Kontakion 10
- Kontakion: "To Thee the Champion Leader"
- Canon to the Theotokos Odes 7–9
- Kontakion: "To Thee the Champion Leader"
- Ikos 10-Kontakion 13 (+ Ikos 1)
- Kontakion: "To Thee the Champion Leader"
- Trisagion Prayers
- Kontakion: "To Thee the Champion Leader"
- Prayers to the Theotokos, Christ and the Holy Trinity
- Dismissal
- Mutual forgiveness
- Litany: "Let us pray for the peace of the world"
- Sessional Hymn: "Gabriel stood amazed"

=== Matins of the Akathist (Slavic and Greek monastery use) ===
- Usual beginning
- Psalms 19 and 20
- Trisagion Prayers
- Troparia: "O Lord, save Thy people" Glory... "Lifted up willingly" Both now... "O protectress of Christians"
- Short Litany
- Blessing: "Glory to the holy, consubstantial, life-giving and undivided Trinity"
- Six Psalms: Psalms 3, 37, 62, 87, 102 and 142
- Great Litany
- "God is the Lord" in Tone 8
  - Troparion: "Taking knowledge of the secret command" (thrice)
- Psalter Reading: Sixteenth Kathisma
- Little Litany
- Kontakion: "To Thee the Champion Leader"
- Ikos 1-Kontakion 4
- Kontakion: "To Thee the Champion Leader"
- Psalter Reading: Seventeenth Kathisma
- Little Litany
- Kontakion: "To Thee the Champion Leader"
- Ikos 4-Kontakion 7
- Kontakion: "To Thee the Champion Leader"
- Psalm 50
- Canons to the Patron Saint and the Theotokos Odes 1 & 3
- Little Litany
- Kontakion: "To Thee the Champion Leader"
- Ikos 7-Kontakion 10
- Kontakion: "To Thee the Champion Leader"
- Sessional Hymn: "Coming to the city of Nazareth"
- Canons to the Patron Saint and the Theotokos Odes 4 & 5
- Canon to the Theotokos and Four-Ode Canons Ode 6
- Little Litany
- Kontakion: "To Thee the Champion Leader"
- Ikos 10-Kontakion 13 (+ Ikos 1)
- Kontakion: "To Thee the Champion Leader"
- Canon to the Theotokos and Four-Ode Canons Odes 7 & 8
- Magnificat
- Canon to the Theotokos and Four-Ode Canons Ode 9
- Little Litany
- Exapostilarion: "The mystery hidden from all ages"
- Lauds in Tone 4 with 4 stichera:
  - "A mystery hidden" (twice); "A pavilion full of light is prepared for Thee"; "Gabriel the Archangel shall come to thee openly"
  - Glory... Both now... "The Theotokos heard a voice she knew not"
- Great Doxology
- Troparion: "Taking knowledge of the secret command"
- Litany of Fervent Intercession
- Morning Litany with Bowing of Heads
- Dismissal

The writing of akathists (occasionally spelled acathist) developed within the Slavic traditions as a genre of its own as part of the general composition of an akolouthia, although not all compositions are widely known nor translated beyond the original language. Reader Isaac E. Lambertsen has done a large amount of translation work, including many different akathists. Most of the newer akathists are pastiche, that is, a generic form imitating the original 6th-century akathist to the Theotokos into which a particular saint's name is inserted. In the Greek, Arabic, and Russian Old Rite traditions, the only akathist permitted in formal liturgical use is the original akathist.

== Indulgence ==
The Enchiridion Indulgentiarum of 2004 confirmed the plenary indulgence on condition that it is recited piously in a church or oratory (even alone), in a family, religious community, an association of Christ's faithful or, more generally, in a meeting of a plurality of people who come together honestly for this purpose. In other circumstances, partial indulgence is permitted.

== Icons ==
There are three miraculous icons of the Theotokos on Mount Athos, which are known by the title of "Akathist":

=== Dionysiou ===
This icon "Panagia of the Salutations the Myrrhgusher" is in a chapel of the Dionysiou Monastery where the Akathist is sung daily before it. The inscription on the back of the icon states it was a gift to Saint Dionysius by Emperor Alexios III Komnenos, upon his visit to Trebizond in Asia Minor. According to tradition, this is the icon that Patriarch Sergius carried in procession around the walls of Constantinople in 626 A.D. when the city was attacked by the Persians and Avars.

=== Hilandar ===
The icon of the Theotokos "Of the Akathist" is on the iconostasis of Hilandar Monastery. In 1837 a fire occurred at this monastery, and the monks were chanting the Akathist Hymn in front of this icon. Though the fire caused great destruction around it the icon itself remained untouched by the flames.

The feast day of the Icon of the Theotokos "Akathist-Hilandar" is celebrated on January 12 (for those churches which follow the Julian Calendar January 12 falls on January 25 of the modern Gregorian Calendar).

=== Zographou ===
A similar icon is venerated in the Monastery of Zographou. The feast day of the Icon of the Theotokos "Akathist-Zographou" is celebrated on October 10 (October 23).
