= Gloria Patri =

Trinitarian doxology

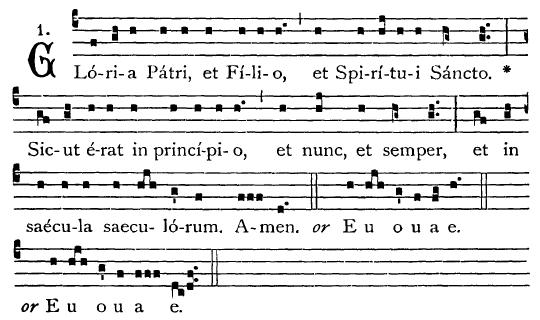
A Gregorian chant setting of the Gloria Patri from the Liber Usualis, with two euouae alternatives

The Gloria Patri, also known in English as the Glory Be to the Father or, colloquially, the Glory Be, is a doxology, a short hymn of praise to God in various Christian liturgies. It is also referred to as the Minor Doxology (Doxologia Minor) or Lesser Doxology, to distinguish it from the Greater Doxology, the Gloria in Excelsis Deo.

The earliest Christian doxologies are addressed to the Father "through" (διὰ) the Son, or to the Father and the Holy Spirit with (μετά) the Son, or to the Son with (σύν) the Father and the Holy Spirit.

The Trinitarian doxology addressed in parallel fashion to all three Divine Persons of the Trinity, joined by and (καί), as in the form of baptism, Matthew 28:19, became universal in Nicaean Christianity, which was established as the official faith of the Roman Empire with the Edict of Thessalonica in 380.

== Greek version ==
The Greek wording is as follows:

Δόξα Πατρὶ καὶ Υἱῷ καὶ Ἁγίῳ Πνεύματι,
καὶ νῦν καὶ ἀεὶ καὶ εἰς τοὺς αἰῶνας τῶν αἰώνων. Ἀμήν.

Dóxa Patrì kaì Huiôi kaì Hagíōi Pneúmati,
kaì nûn kaì aeì kaì eis toùs aiônas tôn aiṓnōn. Amḗn.

Glory to the Father, and to the Son, and to the Holy Spirit,
Both now and ever, and unto the ages of ages. Amen.

The second part is occasionally slightly modified and other verses are sometimes introduced between the two halves.

== Syriac version ==
Modern Sureth (used by the Assyrian Church of the East and the Chaldean Catholic Church)

Shouha tababa, W-brona, W-ruha dqudsha,
min’alam w’adamma L-’alam, Amen.

East Classical Syriac (used by the Assyrian Church of the East, the Chaldean Catholic Church, the Syro Malabar Church, and other churches of the East Syriac traditions)

Shuw’ha L’Awa U’lawra wal’Ruha D’Qudsha
Min Alam wadamma L’alam, Amen Wamen.

West Syriac (used by the Syriac Orthodox Church, the Malankara Orthodox Syrian Church, the Syriac Catholic Church and the Maronite Church)

shubho labo w-labro wal-ruho qadisho
men 'olam w'adamo l'olam olmin, Amin.

Glory be to the Father and to the Son and to the Holy Spirit,
from everlasting and for ever and ever (literal translation)

According to Worship Music: A Concise Dictionary, the lesser doxology is of Syrian origin.

There is an alternative version which the Syriac Orthodox Church and Syriac Catholic Church use in their liturgies:

shubho labo w-labro wal-ruho qadisho
wa'layn mhile w-hatoye rahme wahnono neshtaf'un batrayhun 'olme l'olam 'olmin, amin.

Glory be to the Father and to the Son and to the Holy Spirit,
And upon us, weak and sinful, may mercy and compassion be showered, in both worlds, forever and ever. Amen.

== Arabic ==
Arabic is one of the official liturgical languages of the Church of Jerusalem and the Church of Antioch, both autocephalous Orthodox Churches and two of the four ancient Patriarchates of the Pentarchy.

The Arabic wording of this doxology is as follows:

المجد للآب و الابن و الروح القدس

.الان و كل أوان و الى دهر الداهرين، أمين

== Latin version ==
Gloria Patri, et Filio, et Spiritui Sancto,
sicut erat in principio, et nunc, et semper, et in sæcula sæculorum. Amen.

Glory to the Father, and to the Son, and to the Holy Spirit,
as it was in the beginning, and now, and forever, and unto the ages of ages. Amen.

This differs from the Greek version because of the insertion of "sicut erat in principio", which is now taken to mean "as it (glory) was in the beginning", but which seems originally to have meant "as he (the Son) was in the beginning", and echo of the opening words of the Gospel according to John: "In the beginning was the Word".

In 529, the Second Synod of Vasio (Vaison-la-Romaine) in Gaul said in its fifth canon that the second part of the doxology, with the words "sicut erat in principio", was used in Rome, the East, and Africa, and ordered that it be said likewise in Gaul. Writing in the 1909 Catholic Encyclopedia, Adrian Fortescue, while remarking that what the synod said of the East was false, took the synod's decree to mean that the form originally used in the West was the same as the Greek form. From about the 7th century, the present Roman Rite version became almost universal throughout the West.

The Mozarabic Rite, originating in what is now Spain, uses a shorter version:

Gloria et honor Patri et Filio et Spiritui sancto
in sæcula sæculorum.

Glory and honour to the Father and to the Son and to the Holy Spirit
for ages of ages. Amen

== English versions ==
The following traditional form is the most common in Anglican usage and in older Lutheran liturgical books:

Glory be to the Father, and to the Son:
and to the Holy Ghost;
as it was in the beginning, is now, and ever shall be:
world without end. Amen.

The translations of "semper" as "ever shall be", and "in saecula saeculorum" as "world without end" date at least from Thomas Cranmer's Book of Common Prayer.

The Catholic Church uses the same English form, but today replaces "Holy Ghost" with "Holy Spirit", as in The Divine Office the edition of the Liturgy of the Hours used in most English-speaking countries outside the United States. Divine Worship: The Missal, published by the Holy See in 2015 for use under the Apostolic Constitution Anglicanorum coetibus, allows "Holy Spirit" and "Holy Ghost" to be used interchangeably.

In 1971, the International Consultation on English Texts (ICET) issued a new translation:

Glory to the Father, and to the Son, and to the Holy Spirit:
as it was in the beginning, is now, and will be for ever. Amen.

This was adopted in the publication Liturgy of the Hours (Catholic Book Publishing Company), but is not used in all English translations of the Liturgy of The Hours (such as in England and Wales). It is found also in some Anglican and Lutheran publications.

A variant found in Common Worship has "shall" instead of "will":

Glory to the Father and to the Son
and to the Holy Spirit;
as it was in the beginning is now
and shall be for ever. Amen.

(In the third person, "shall"—as opposed to "will"—implies a degree of promise on the part of the speaker over and above mere futurity.)

The doxology in use by the English-speaking Orthodox and Greek Catholic Churches follows the Greek form, of which one English translation is:

Glory to the Father and the Son and the Holy Spirit,
now and forever and to the ages of ages. Amen.

The translation of the Greek form used by the Melkite Greek Catholic Church in the United States is:

Glory be to the Father, and to the Son, and to the Holy Spirit,
now and always and forever and ever. Amen.

== Use ==
=== Eastern Churches ===
In the Eastern Orthodox Church, Oriental Orthodoxy, the Church of the East, and the Eastern Catholic Churches, the Lesser Doxology is frequently used at diverse points in services and private prayers. Among other instances, it is said three times by the reader during the usual beginning of every service, and as part of the dismissal at the end. When it is used in a series of hymns it is chanted either before the last hymn or before the penultimate hymn. In the latter case, it is divided in half, the "Glory..." being chanted before the penultimate hymn, and "Both now..." being chanted before the final hymn (which is usually a Theotokion).

=== Western Churches ===
In the Roman Rite, the Gloria Patri is frequently chanted or recited in the Liturgy of the Hours principally at the end of psalms and canticles and in the responsories. There are a few exceptions: for the canticle in the Book of Daniel, Chapter 3 (The Prayer of Azariah and Song of the Three Holy Children), the Gloria Patri is not chanted; rubrics in the liturgical books direct that: In fine huius cantici non dicitur Gloria Patri ("at the end of this canticle the Gloria Patri is not to be said"). Instead, the phrase "Praise him, and magnify him forever" is used.

The Gloria Patri also figures in the Introit of the Latin Mass. It is also present in the Introit in the form of the Roman Rite published in Divine Worship: The Missal. The prayer also figures prominently in pious devotions, notably the Rosary, where it is recited at the end of each decade. Among Anglicans, the Gloria Patri is mainly used at the Daily Offices of Morning and Evening Prayer, to introduce and conclude the singing or recitation of psalms, and to conclude the canticles that lack their own concluding doxologies.

Lutherans have historically added the Gloria Patri both after the chanting of the Responsorial Psalm and following the Nunc Dimittis during their Divine Service, as well as during Matins and Vespers in the Canonical hours. In Methodism, the Gloria Patri (usually in the traditional English form above) is frequently sung to conclude the "responsive reading" of the psalms as they are set out for congregational reading.

=== Indulgence ===
On 11 July 1815, Pope Pius VII established an indulgence of 100 days for every prayer of the Gloria Patri, obtainable up to a maximum of three times a day.

== See also ==
- Greater doxology
