= Improperia =

Series of antiphons sung on Good Friday

Opening line of the Gregorian setting of the Improperia, with rubric, as found in the Liber Usualis

The Improperia are a series of antiphons and responses, expressing the remonstrance of Jesus Christ with his people. Also known as the Reproaches or the Solemn Reproaches, they are sung in certain Christian liturgies (such as the Roman Catholic and Evangelical-Lutheran traditions) as part of the observance of the Passion, usually on the afternoon of Good Friday. In the Byzantine Rite, they are found in various hymns of Good Friday and Holy Saturday. The Improperia appear in the Pontificale of Prudentius (846–61) and gradually came into use throughout Europe in the eleventh and twelfth centuries, finally being incorporated into the Roman Ordo in the fourteenth century.

== Roman Rite ==
In their present form in the Roman Rite, the Improperia are a series of three couplets, sung antiphonally by cantors and followed by alternate Greek and Latin responses from the two halves of the choir; and nine other lines sung by the cantors, with the full choir responding after each with the refrain "Popule meus, quid feci tibi? ..." Besides the Kyrie, this is the only usage of the Greek language in the Roman Rite. Thus the Improperia begin with this couplet that includes parts of the Trisagion:

Cantor 1: Popule meus, quid feci tibi? Aut in quo contristavi te? Responde mihi.
Cantor 2: Quia eduxi te de terra Ægypti: parasti Crucem Salvatori tuo.
Choir A: Hagios o Theos.
Choir B: Sanctus Deus.
Choir A: Hagios Ischyros.
Choir B: Sanctus Fortis.
Choir A: Hagios Athanatos, eleison hymas.
Choir B: Sanctus Immortalis, miserere nobis.

My people, what have I done to you? How have I offended you? Answer me!
I led you out of Egypt, from slavery to freedom, but you led your Saviour to the cross.
Holy is God!
Holy is God!
Holy and strong!
Holy and strong!
Holy immortal One, have mercy on us.
Holy immortal One, have mercy on us.

The second couplet is sung antiphonally by two cantors of the second choir, and the third couplet by two cantors of the first choir; after each the two choirs respond as above. The nine following reproaches are sung alternately by the cantors of each choir, beginning with the second, with the full choir responding after each reproach with the line, "Popule meus ...":

Cantors 3 & 4: Ego propter te flagellavi Ægyptum cum primogenitis suis: et tu me flagellatum tradidisti.
Choirs A & B: Popule meus, quid feci tibi? Aut in quo contristavi te? Responde mihi.
Cantors 1 & 2: Ego eduxi te de Ægypto, demerso Pharaone in mare rubrum: et tu me tradidisti principibus sacerdotum.
Choirs A & B: Popule meus, quid feci tibi? Aut in quo contristavi te? Responde mihi.

For your sake I scourged your captors and their firstborn sons, but you brought your scourges down on me.
My people, what have I done to you? How have I offended you? Answer me!
I led you from slavery to freedom and drowned your captors in the red sea, but you handed me over to your high priests.
My people ...

After the last Improperium and its refrain, the hymns Crux fidelis and Pange lingua are sung.

Improperia: Gregorian chant

== Lutheranism ==
In Lutheranism, the Reproaches are commonly chanted each Good Friday. The Reproaches begin with the first of three exchanges between the priest/pastor and congregation. The priest/pastor or cantor begins:

Thus says the Lord:
"What have I done to you, O my people,
And wherein have I offended you?
Answer me.
For I have raised you up out of the prison house of sin and death,
"And you have delivered up your Redeemer to be scourged.
For I have redeemed you from the house of bondage,
And you have nailed your Savior to the cross.
O my people!"

The congregation or choir responds:

Holy Lord God,
Holy and mighty God,
Holy and most merciful Redeemer;
God eternal, leave us not to bitter death.
O Lord, have mercy!

The congregation then sings,

Lamb of God, pure and holy, Who on the cross didst suffer.
Ever patient and lowly, Thyself to scorn didst offer.
All sins Thou borest for us, else had dispair reigned o'er us,
Have mercy upon us, O Jesus, O Jesus.

The pastor continues:

Thus says the Lord:
"What have I done to you, O my people,
And wherein have I offended you?
Answer me.
For I have conquered all your foes,
And you have given me over and delivered me to those who persecute me.
For I have fed you with my Word and refreshed you with living water,
And you have given me gall and vinegar to drink.
O my people!"

The congregation or choir responds:

Holy Lord God,
Holy and mighty God,
Holy and most merciful Redeemer;
God eternal, allow us not to lose hope in the face of death and hell.
O Lord, have mercy!

The congregation sings

Lamb of God, pure and holy, Who on the cross didst suffer.
Ever patient and lowly, Thyself to scorn didst offer.
All sins Thou borest for us, else had dispair reigned o'er us,

Have mercy upon us, O Jesus, O Jesus.

The pastor or Kantor continues:

Thus says the Lord:
"What have I done to you, O my people,
And wherein have I offended you?
Answer me.
What more could have been done for my vineyard than I have done for it?
When I looked for good grapes, why did it yield only bad?
My people, is this how you thank your God?
O my people!"

The congregation or choir sings:

Holy Lord God,
Holy and mighty God,
Holy and most merciful Redeemer;
God eternal, keep us steadfast in the true faith.
O Lord, have mercy!

The congregation sings,

Lamb of God, pure and holy, Who on the cross didst suffer.
Ever patient and lowly, Thyself to scorn didst offer.
All sins Thou borest for us, else had dispair reigned o'er us,
Thy peace be with us, O Jesus, O Jesus.

== Anglicanism ==
During the English Reformation, the Reproaches were suppressed by Thomas Cranmer, Archbishop of Canterbury when he authored the first Book of Common Prayer in the sixteenth century. However, the liturgical movement and the desire to connect with ancient liturgical traditions has led to some Provinces in the Anglican Communion to reintroduce the Reproaches. For example, the revisers of the 1989 Anglican Prayer Book of the Anglican Church of Southern Africa to reintroduce the Reproaches as "The Solemn Adoration of Christ Crucified".

In many Anglican Good Friday Liturgies, the Reproaches are sung at the Veneration of the Cross.

== Reformed (Continental Reformed, Presbyterian, and Congregationalist) ==
In the Presbyterian Church (USA), the Reproaches were incorporated in its 1993 Book of Common Worship, pp. 287–291 (Revised 2018). They are part of the Good Friday liturgy, and follow the Solemn Intercessions and Lord's Prayer. They may involve a rough-hewn cross carried in procession and placed before the worshipers, and thus begin, "Behold the cross on which was hung the salvation of the whole world." The people respond, "Come, let us worship." After the third repeat of this antiphonal call to worship, the reproaches begin. There are nine, each introduced by the congregation saying, "Holy God, Holy and mighty, Holy immortal One, have mercy upon us." and concluded with the congregation praying "Lord, have mercy." Though all nine can be read, they are chosen at the option of the liturgist. They can be followed by a psalm or hymn or other musical offering, and the congregation, thereafter, departs in silence.

If used in the service of Friday Tenebrae, they are read at the end of the lessons, once only the Christ candle is still burning. At their end, the Christ candle is extinguished. Often a bell or chime is stuck 33 times in remembrance of Jesus' years, as the people sit in silence. Thereafter, the people depart in silence and darkness.

== Methodism ==
The Reproaches are included in the Methodist Church of Great Britain's liturgy for Good Friday and in the United Methodist Church's Good Friday service. They were included in the ritual of the American Methodist Church, one of the predecessor denominations of the United Methodist Church, in its "Order of Worship for Good Friday Evening".

== See also ==
- Paschal Triduum
