= Usual beginning =

The usual beginning is the series of prayers with which most divine services begin in the Eastern Orthodox Church and those Eastern Catholic Churches which follow the Byzantine Rite.

== Normal form ==
The usual beginning starts with a blessing by the priest, which is usually:

- Blessed is our God, always now and ever, and unto the ages of ages.

However, if there is no priest, the reader says:

- Through the prayers of our holy fathers, Lord Jesus Christ, Son of God, have mercy on us.

Then, the reader continues:

- Amen. [Glory to Thee, our God, glory to Thee!] (Note: The portion in brackets is sometimes omitted.)
- [O Heavenly King, Comforter, Spirit of Truth, Who art everywhere present and fillest all things, Treasury of good things, and Giver of life: come and abide in us, and cleanse us from every sin, and save our souls, O Good One!]
- The Trisagion: Holy God, holy Mighty, holy Immortal, have mercy on us (three times, everyone making a bow at the waist each time).
- Glory to the Father, and to the Son, and to the Holy Spirit, both now and ever, and unto the ages of ages. Amen.
- O All-Holy Trinity, have mercy on us; O Lord, blot out our sins; O Master, pardon our iniquities; O Holy One, visit and heal our infirmities for Thy Name's sake.
- Lord, have mercy (three times).
- Glory to the Father, and to the Son, and to the Holy Spirit, both now and ever, and unto the ages of ages. Amen.
- Our Father, Who art in the heavens, hallowed be Thy name. Thy kingdom come. Thy will be done, on earth as it is in heaven. Give us this day our daily bread, and forgive us our trespasses, as we forgive those who trespass against us. And lead us not into temptation, but deliver us from evil.

The priest concludes the Our Father by saying:

- For Thine is the Kingdom, and the Power and the Glory: of the Father, and of the Son, and of the Holy Spirit, now and ever and unto the ages of ages.

Reader:

- Amen. Lord, have mercy (twelve times)
- Glory to the Father, and to the Son, and to the Holy Spirit, both now and ever, and unto the ages of ages. Amen.
- O come, let us worship God our King. (Bow.) O come, let us worship and fall down before Christ our King and our God. (Bow.) O come, let us worship and fall down before Christ Himself, our King and our God. (Bow.)

=== Old Believers ===
Among the Old Believers the usual beginning is preceded by the following, known as the "Prayer of the Publican":

- God be merciful to me a sinner. (After which all make a bow.)
- Thou hast created me; Lord, have mercy on me. (Bow.)
- I have sinned immeasurably; Lord, forgive me. (Bow.)

Some say an alternate version of the last prayer:

- I have sinned immeasurably; Lord have mercy and forgive me, a sinner. (Bow.)

Then the Axion Estin is said, followed by:

- Glory to the Father, and to the Son, and to the Holy Spirit. (Bow.) Now and ever, and unto the ages of ages. Amen. (Bow.) Lord, have mercy, Lord, have mercy. Lord, bless (Bow.)
- Lord Jesus Christ, Son of God, through the prayers of Thy most pure Mother, by the power of the precious and life-giving Cross, through the intercessions of my holy Guardian Angel, and of all the saints, have mercy on me and save me a sinner, for Thou art good and lovest mankind. (Prostration.)

== Abbreviated form ==
The different services of the Daily Office are often combined into aggregates, often of three services, combined into one continuous period of worship. When this happens, the full usual beginning is only performed at the first service, at subsequent services, only "O come, let us worship..." is said. Sometimes this is preceded by a blessing from the priest.

== Pentecostarion ==
During Bright Week (the week beginning on Easter Sunday) the services are completely different from the rest of the year, and there is no usual beginning.

The hymn, "O Heavenly King..." (above) is one of the propers of Pentecost, and will not be said from Pascha (Easter) until the feast of Pentecost, fifty days later.

From Thomas Sunday until the Great Feast of the Ascension, "O Heavenly King" is replaced with the Troparion of Pascha:

Christ is risen from the dead, trampling down death by death, and upon those in the tombs bestowing life! (Three times)

From Ascension until its leavetaking, “O Heavenly King” is omitted entirely, and replaced by nothing (symbolizing the physical "absence" of Jesus and the expectant coming of the Holy Spirit). Instead, immediately after the priest's blessing, the reader says: "Amen. Holy God..."

== See also ==
- Seven bow beginning
