= Unto the ages of ages =

Phrase expressing the idea of eternity

The phrase "unto the ages of ages" expresses either the idea of eternity, or an indeterminate number of aeons. The phrase is a translation of the original Koine Greek phrase εἰς τοὺς αἰῶνας τῶν αἰώνων (eis toùs aionas ton aiṓnōn), which occurs in the original Greek texts of the Christian New Testament (e.g., in Philippians 4:20). In the Latin Vulgate, the same phrase is translated as in saecula saeculorum.

== Meaning and translations ==
The literal mirror translation of the phrase "εἰς τοὺς αἰῶνας τῶν αἰώνων" is "into the ages of the ages."

The phrase possibly expresses the eternal duration of God's attributes, but it could also be an idiomatic way to represent a very long passage of time. Other variations of the phrase are found at (e.g., Ephesians 3:21), as εἰς πάσας τὰς γενεὰς τοῦ αἰῶνος τῶν αἰώνων, ἀμήν, here referring to the glory of God the Father; this may be translated as "from all generations for ever and ever, Amen", "for ages unto ages", or similar phrases.

The translation of aiōnas can be temporal, in which case it would correspond to the English "ages". Then again, it can be spatial, translated as "world" or "universe", and then one would need to translate in spatial terms, describing the cosmos so as to include both the heavenly and earthly world.

According to scholar David Bentley Hart: “Much depends, naturally, on how content one is to see the Greek adjective αιωνιον, aionios, rendered simply and flatly as "eternal" or "everlasting." It is, after all, a word whose ambiguity has been noted since the earliest centuries of the church. Certainly the noun αἰών, aion (or aeon), from which it is derived, did come during the classical and late antique periods to refer on occasion to a period of endless or at least indeterminate duration; but that was never its most literal acceptation. Throughout the whole of ancient and late antique Greek literature, an "aeon" was most properly an "age," which is simply to say a "substantial period of time" or an "extended interval." At first, it was typically used to indicate the lifespan of a single person, though sometimes it could be used of a considerably shorter period (even, as it happens, a single year). It came over time to mean something like a discrete epoch, or a time far in the past, or an age far off in the future", and also "John Chrysostom, in his commentary on Ephesians, even used the word aiōnios of the kingdom of the devil specifically to indicate that it is temporary (for it will last only till the end of the present age, he explains)".

== New Testament ==
In the New Testament, the phrase occurs twelve times in the Book of Revelation alone, and another seven times across the epistles, but not in the Four Gospels:

- Galatians 1:5: "... δόξα εἰς τοὺς αἰῶνας τῶν αἰώνων, ἀμήν."
- Philippians 4:20: "...δόξα εἰς τοὺς αἰῶνας τῶν αἰώνων, ἀμήν."
- 1 Timothy 1:17: "...δόξα εἰς τοὺς αἰῶνας τῶν αἰώνων, ἀμήν."
- 2 Timothy 4:18: "...δόξα εἰς τοὺς αἰῶνας τῶν αἰώνων, ἀμήν."
- Hebrews 13:21: "...δόξα εἰς τοὺς αἰῶνας [τῶν αἰώνων], ἀμήν."
- 1 Peter 4:11: "...δόξα καὶ τὸ κράτος εἰς τοὺς αἰῶνας τῶν αἰώνων, ἀμήν."
- Revelation 1:6: "...δόξα καὶ τὸ κράτος εἰς τοὺς αἰῶνας [τῶν αἰώνων] · ἀμήν."
- 5:13: "...δόξα καὶ τὸ κράτος εἰς τοὺς αἰῶνας τῶν αἰώνων."
- 7:12, 10:6, 11:15, 15:7, 19:3, 20:10, 22:5: "... εἰς τοὺς αἰῶνας τῶν αἰώνων"

== Hebrew Bible ==
Some verses in the Hebrew Bible are similar to the "ages of ages" formula: For example, verses such as וּֽמֵעֹולָ֥ם עַד־עֹ֝ולָ֗ם (Psalm 90:2), or לְמִן־עֹולָ֖ם וְעַד־עֹולָֽם (Jeremiah 25:5), or מִן־הָעֹולָ֖ם עַד־הָעֹולָ֑ם (Nehemiah 9:5). All these slightly different variations mean more or less the same: "(and) from (the) age to (the) age". The Hebrew לְעֹולָ֥ם וָעֶֽד, which appears in verses such as Micah 4:5, was rendered in Greek LXX as εἰς τὸν αἰῶνα καὶ ἐπέκεινα, in Latin as in aeternum et ultra, and in English Bible translations usually as "for ever and ever". In translations such as Young's Literal Translation, it is usually rendered as a finite duration, e.g., Nehemiah 9:5 "from the age unto the age". In Aramaic, the same phrase was rendered as לְעָלְמֵי עָלְמַיָּ (lalmey almaya, literally "from the eternity of eternities" or "from the world of worlds"), for instance in the Kaddish, an important prayer in Jewish liturgy.

== Christian liturgical use ==
The formula has a prominent place in Christian liturgies of both the Latin Rite and the Byzantine Rite, in the Liturgy of the Hours and the Eucharist: Trinitarian doxologies ending with the formula conclude the Psalms (e.g., the Gloria Patri), many prayers spoken by the priest, and hymns such as Tantum Ergo by Thomas Aquinas or Veni Creator Spiritus. When it is followed by an Amen, the last two words (sæculorum, Amen) may be abbreviated “Euouae” in Mediaeval musical notation. Vernacular liturgical traditions often do not translate the Greek and Latin formula literally: English translations of Christian prayers issued in 1541 by King Henry VIII and appearing in the Book of Common Prayer beginning in 1552 replace it with the phrase “world without end”; the German Lutheran tradition reads “von Ewigkeit zu Ewigkeit” (“from eternity to eternity”), which is probably based on Old Testament formulas such as Psalm 90:2, Jeremiah 25:5, and Nehemiah 9:5.

== See also ==
- Christian eschatology
- Ten thousand years
- sanctum sanctorum – Latin translation of the Hebrew term Qṓḏeš HaQŏḏāšîm (Holy of Holies)
