= Euouae =

Musical mnemonic

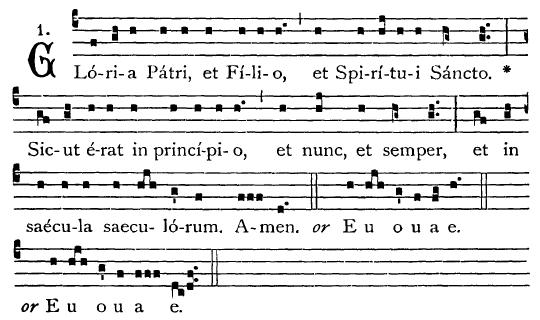
A psalm-tone setting of the Gloria Patri in neumes, with two alternative melodies for the words saeculorum Amen indicated with the abbreviation Euouae.

Euouae (/juː.ˈuː.iː/ yew-OO-ee; sometimes spelled Evovae) is an abbreviation used as a musical mnemonic in Latin psalters and other liturgical books of the Roman Rite. It is constructed from the syllables of the Latin words saeculorum Amen, or seculorum Amen in post-classical Latin. The words are taken from the Gloria Patri, a Christian doxology that concludes with the phrase in saecula saeculorum. Amen. The mnemonic is used to notate the variable melodic endings (differentiae) of psalm tones in Gregorian chant.

In some cases, the letters of Euouae may be further abbreviated to E—E. A few books of English chant (notably Burgess and Palmer's The Plainchant Gradual) make use of oioueae for the equivalent English phrase, "world without end. Amen".

According to Guinness World Records, Euouae is the longest word in the English language consisting only of vowels, and also the English word with the most consecutive vowels. As a mnemonic originating from Latin, it is unclear that it should count as an English word; however, it is found in the unabridged Collins English Dictionary.

Its all-vowel composition makes it an effective play for certain kinds of vowel-heavy Scrabble racks, and the plural form ("euouaes") means a bingo can be made in certain situations. Both the singular and plural forms of the word are contained within the official Collins Scrabble Words dictionary and various other acceptable competition dictionaries.

A similar abbreviation, Aevia (or Aeuia), was used to abbreviate the word Alleluia in medieval Office books. In Venetian and other Italian Office books of the 16th century, an equivalent abbreviation, Hal'a, or Hal'ah, can be substituted for Aevia.
