= Antiphon =

Short chant in Christian ritual

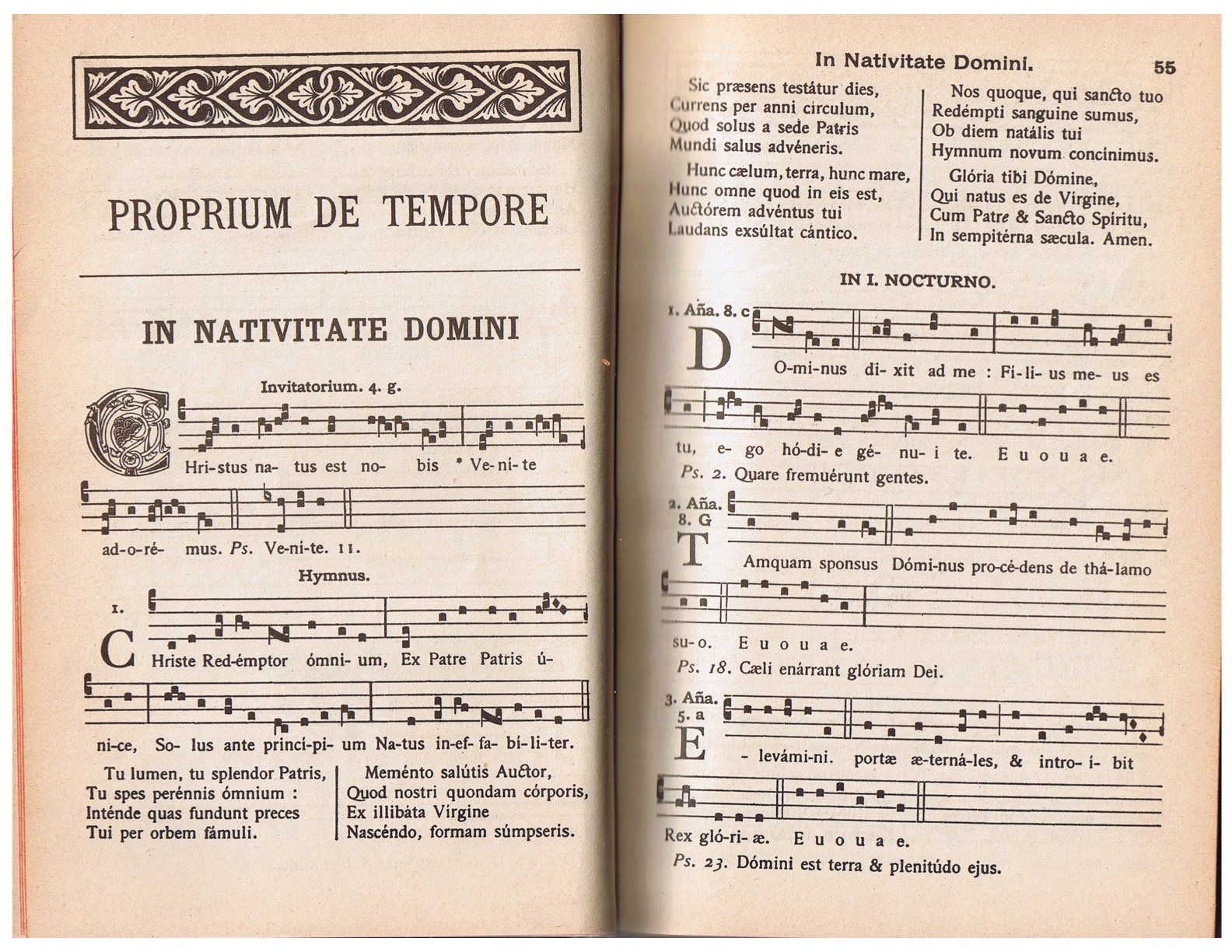
The Liber responsorialis, showing on the right-hand page the antiphons for the first night office of Christmas. The associated psalm tones are indicated by number and ending pitch, and the pitches for the ending of the doxology are indicated by the mnemonic Euouae.

An antiphon (Greek ἀντίφωνον, ἀντί "opposite" and φωνή "voice") is a short chant in Christian ritual, sung as a refrain. The texts of antiphons are usually taken from the Psalms or Scripture, but may also be freely composed. Their form was favored by St. Ambrose and they feature prominently in Ambrosian chant, but they are used widely in Gregorian chant as well. They may be used during Mass, for the Introit, the Offertory or the Communion. They may also be used in the Liturgy of the Hours, typically for Lauds or Vespers.

They should not be confused with Marian antiphons or processional antiphons.

When a chant consists of alternating verses (usually sung by a cantor) and responses (usually sung by the congregation), a refrain is needed.

The looser term antiphony is generally used for any call and response style of singing, such as the kirtan or the sea shanty and other work songs, and songs and worship in African and African-American culture. Antiphonal music is that performed by two choirs in interaction, often singing alternate musical phrases. Antiphonal psalmody is the singing or musical playing of psalms by alternating groups of performers. The term "antiphony" can also refer to a choir-book containing antiphons.

== Origins ==
The chant of early Christianity through to the end of the 5th century had its root in the synagogue, whence early Christians borrowed the traditions of the chanting of psalms, singing of hymns and cantillation. There is some evidence from Acts of the Apostles that early Christians stayed close to contemporary Jewish traditions. For example, Acts 2:46–47 states that "with one accord in the Temple, and breaking bread from house to house did eat their meat with gladness and singleness of heart, praising God, and having favour with all the people". Socrates of Constantinople wrote that antiphony was introduced into Christian worship by Ignatius of Antioch (died 107) after he saw a vision of two choirs of angels. Antiphonal singing was an element of Jewish liturgy believed to have entered the monasteries of Syria and Palestine in the 4th century from the Jewish communities such as the one in Antioch.

Antiphons have remained an integral part of the worship in the Byzantine and Armenian Rite. The practice did not become part of the Latin Church until more than two centuries later. Ambrose and Gregory the Great, who are known for their contributions to the formulation of Gregorian chant, are credited with 'antiphonaries', collections of works suitable for antiphon, which are still used in the Catholic Church today.

== Polyphonic votive antiphons ==
Polyphonic Marian antiphons in the Tudor votive style emerged in England in the 14th century as settings of texts honouring the Virgin Mary, which were sung separately from the mass and office, often after Compline. Towards the end of the 15th century, English composers produced expanded settings up to nine parts, with increasing complexity and vocal range. The largest collection of such antiphons is the late-15th-century Eton Choirbook. As a result, antiphony remains particularly common in the Anglican musical tradition: the singers often face each other in the Decani and Cantoris sides of the quire.

== Greater Advent antiphons ==
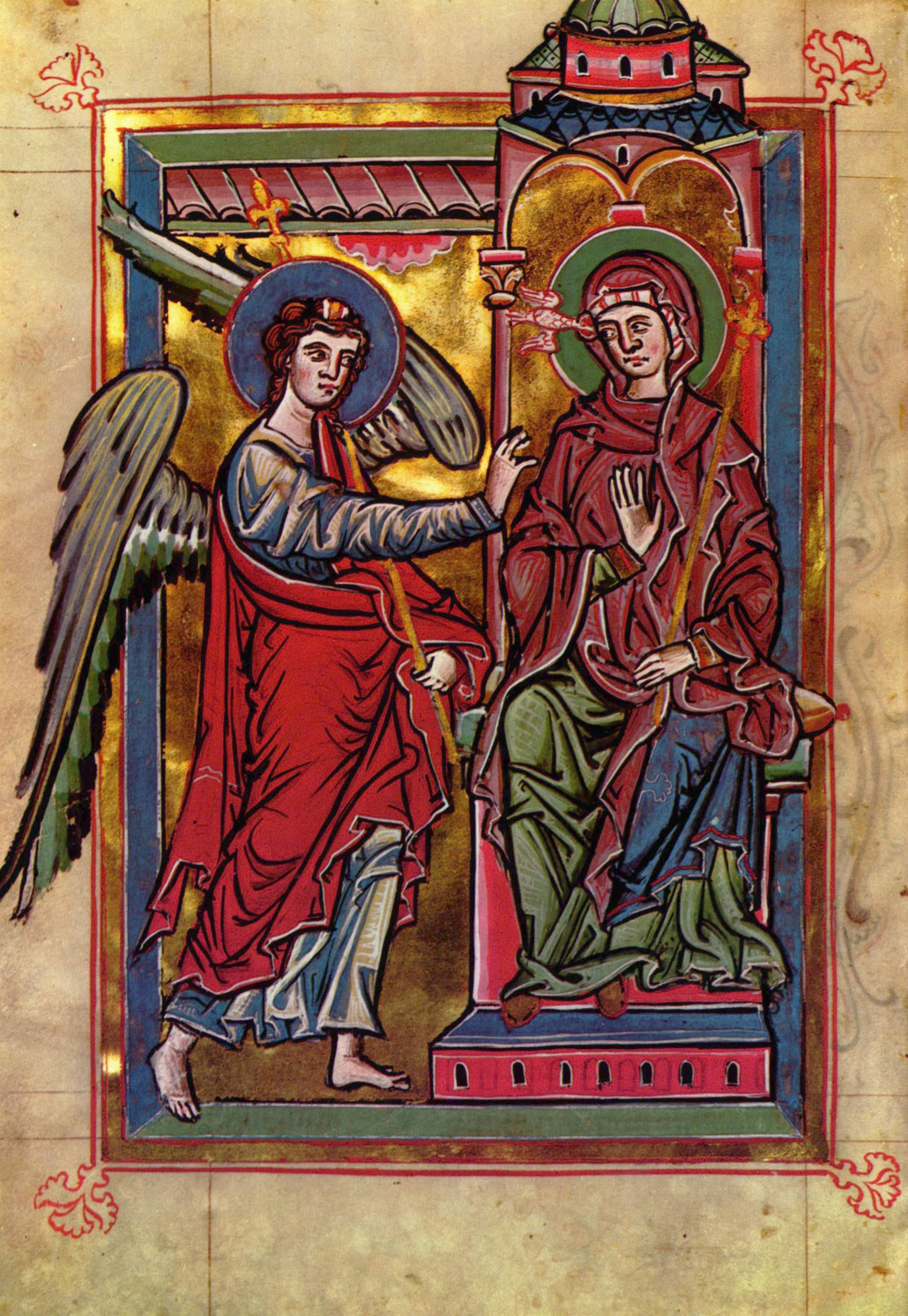
The Annunciation

The Greater Advent or O Antiphons are antiphons used at daily prayer in the evenings of the last days of Advent in various liturgical Christian traditions. Each antiphon is a figurative address to the expected Messiah taken from the Old Testament. In the Roman Catholic tradition, they are sung as antiphons to the Magnificat in Vespers from 17 to 23 December. In the Church of England they have traditionally been used as antiphons to the Magnificat at Evening Prayer. More recently they have found a place in primary liturgical documents throughout the Anglican Communion, including the Church of England's Common Worship liturgy. Use of the O Antiphons was preserved in Lutheranism at the Protestant Reformation, and they continue to be sung in Lutheran churches.

== Polychoral antiphony ==
When two or more groups of singers sing in alternation, the style of music can also be called polychoral. Specifically, this term is usually applied to music of the late Renaissance and early Baroque periods. Polychoral techniques are a definitive characteristic of the music of the Venetian school, exemplified by the works of Giovanni Gabrieli: this music is often known as the Venetian polychoral style. The Venetian polychoral style was an important innovation of the late Renaissance. This style, with its variations as it spread across Europe after 1600, helped to define the beginning of the Baroque era. Polychoral music was not limited to Italy in the Renaissance; it was also popular in France with Marc-Antoine Charpentier (37 settings H.16–H.52), in Spain and Germany. There are examples from the 19th and 20th centuries, from composers as diverse as Hector Berlioz, Igor Stravinsky, Béla Bartók, and Karlheinz Stockhausen.

== See also ==
- Anthem
- Polyphonic form
- Polyphonic singing
- Polychoral compositions
- List of compositions of George Frideric Handel, including three antiphons
