= Trisagion =

Ancient Christian hymn

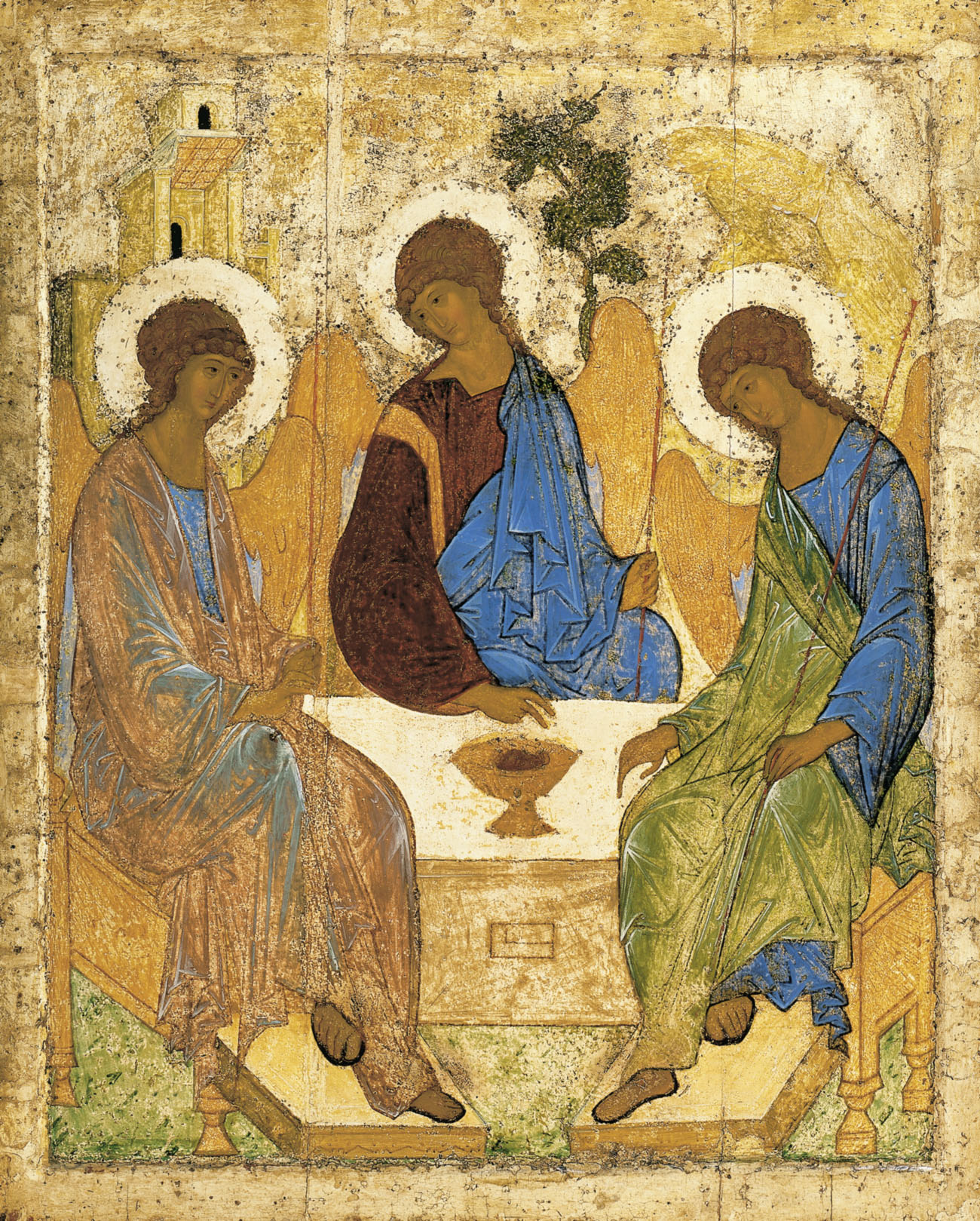
Old Testament Trinity, an icon by Andrei Rublev, c. 1400 (Tretyakov Gallery, Moscow)

The Trisagion (Greek: Τρισάγιον, lit. 'Thrice Holy'), sometimes called by its incipit Agios O Theos (Note: This is the traditional romanisation of the title. A more accurate version, which includes the rough breathing marks and oxiae, would be Hágios ho Theós. For more information, see Rough breathing) (Greek: Άγιος ο Θεός) is a standard hymn of ancient origin of the Divine Liturgy in most of the Eastern Orthodox, Western Orthodox, Oriental Orthodox, and Eastern Catholic Churches.

In Byzantine-rite Churches, the Trisagion is chanted immediately before the Prokeimenon and the Epistle Reading. It is also included in a set of prayers named for it, called the Trisagion Prayers, which forms part of numerous services (the Hours, Vespers, Matins, and as part of the opening prayers for most services).

In the Latin Church, it is most prominent for its use on Good Friday. It is also used in the Liturgy of the Hours and in some Roman Catholic devotions.

== Form of the prayer ==
In Greek:

Ἅγιος ὁ Θεός, Ἅγιος ἰσχυρός, Ἅγιος ἀθάνατος, ἐλέησον ἡμᾶς.
Hágios ho Theós, Hágios iskhūrós, Hágios āthánatos, eléēson hēmâs.

In Latin:

Sanctus Deus, Sanctus Fortis, Sanctus Immortalis, miserere nobis.

In English – literal translation:

Holy God, Holy Strong, Holy Immortal, have mercy on us.

In English – common liturgical translation:

Holy God, Holy Mighty, Holy Immortal, have mercy on us.

In Syriac:

ܩܕܝܫܬ ܐܠܗܐ܆ ܩܕܝܫܬ ܚܝܠܬܢܐ܆ ܩܕܝܫܬ ܠܐ ܡܝܘܬܐ܆ ܐܬܪܚܡܥܠܝܢ

Qadišat Aloho, qadišat ḥaylṯono qadišat lo moyuṯo eṯraḥam ʿlayn.

== History ==
=== Traditional origins ===
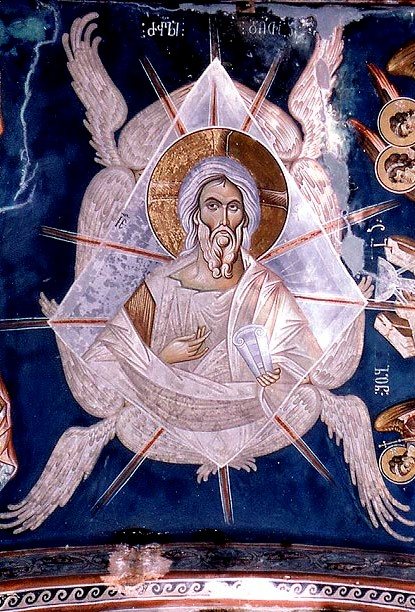
A fresco icon of Christ the Ancient of Days, Ubisi, Georgia

The hymn is common not only to all the Greek and Oriental liturgies but was used also in the Gallican Liturgy. Some believe it is extremely ancient, perhaps of Apostolic-era origin. However this contradicts the tradition in the Greek Menology tradition regarding its origin. The tradition recounts that during the reign of Roman Emperor Theodosius II (402–450), Constantinople was shaken by a violent earthquake, 24 September, and that whilst the people, the emperor and Archbishop Proclus of Constantinople (r. 434–446) were praying for heavenly assistance, a child was suddenly lifted into midair, to whom all cried out Kyrie eleison ('Lord, have mercy'). The child was then seen to descend again to the earth, and in a loud voice he exhorted the people to pray : 'Holy God, Holy Mighty, Holy Immortal'.

The Trisagion seemingly originated in Syria. Its earliest known use in a Christian liturgy was as a chant during a lity in 438 or 439. It was used as an acclamation at the Council of Chalcedon (451), where the Syrian bishops chanted it at the end of the first session. The Trisagion was frequently used as a refrain sung after the verses of an antiphonal psalm, and as a chant at the beginning of the Eucharist. By the 6th century, it had become a permanent part of the liturgy.

The Coptic Orthodox Church and Armenian Apostolic Church believe that the Trisagion originated from Nicodemus. While taking the body of Christ off the cross with Joseph of Arimathea, Nicodemus saw Jesus Christ's eyes open and then shouted "Holy God, Holy Mighty, Holy Immortal!" Traditionally, it is also considered proof that his divinity did not part from his humanity.

=== Greek and Latin ===
The Gallican Liturgy refers to it as being sung both in Greek and in Latin: Incipiente præsule ecclesia Ajus [that is, Agios] psallit, dicens latinum cum græco, as also previously in Greek alone, before the Prophetia. Pope Benedict XIV (r. 1740–1758) thought that the Greek formula was joined with the Latin in allusion to the divine voice heard at Constantinople. But the explanation seems hardly necessary, in view of the retention of Kyrie eleison in the Roman Liturgy, as well as such Hebrew words as amen, alleluia, hosanna, and sabaoth. It is true that the Kyrie eleison is not joined to a Latin version; on the other hand, it is so simple and occurs so frequently, that its meaning could easily be learned and remembered – whereas the entire Trisagion might well receive a parallel version into Latin.

=== Modifications in history ===
Various additions or modifications made to the Trisagion at certain points in history have been the subject of considerable controversy. According to Pseudo-Zacharias Rhetor, the phrase 'who wast crucified for us' was added to it by Patriarch Eustathius of Antioch (r. 324–330) to combat the Arians, although this is dismissed by some scholars. It was more likely written during the time of non-Chalcedonian Patriarch of Antioch Peter the Fuller (r. 471–488) who enforced its use as a sort of "test of orthodoxy against Nestorianism". Those who understood the hymn as being addressed to the Trinity (such as John of Damascus) censured Peter for propagating the teaching of the Theopaschites. Emperor Anastasius I's attempt to adopt the addition in 512 at Constantinople resulted in a riot.

Whether the Trisagion is to be understood as addressed to the Holy Trinity or addressed to God the Son has been a matter of contention, particularly between Chalcedonians and non-Chalcedonians. But, in light of widespread adoption of the hymn with the above addition ('who wast crucified for us'), Calandion, Chalcedonian Bishop of Antioch, sought to allay the controversy surrounding it by prefixing the words 'Christ, King'. This had the effect of making the hymn refer directly to the incarnate Word: Holy God, Holy and Strong, Holy and Immortal, Christ, King, who was crucified for us, have mercy on us. Though perhaps well intended, this effort at emendation was ultimately rejected.

Later Severus, who was the Non-Chalcedonian Patriarch of Antioch, made the use of the longer version standard in his diocese.

The 81st canon of the Council of Trullo anathematised anyone who allows the Trisagion to be modified by adding "who was crucified for us" or any other modification.

In the eleventh century, Pope Gregory VII (r. 1073–1085) wrote to the Armenians, who still used the emended formula, instructing them to avoid all occasion for scandal by removing the additions, which Pope Gregory argues (incorrectly) that neither the Roman nor any Eastern Church (save the Armenians themselves) had adopted. The injunction appears to have been ignored. When, centuries later, Roman Catholic union with the Armenians was again discussed, a question was addressed on 30 January 1635 to the Congregation for the Propagation of the Faith as to whether the Armenian Catholics might still use the formula 'who suffered for us'. The request was answered in the negative. Nevertheless, Armenian Catholics continue to use the traditional formula.

Variations of the traditional formula and Trinitarian ascription are found also in the Armenian Liturgy. In these the hymn is addressed to the Redeemer, and versions vary with the feast or office. Thus, the formula of Peter the Fuller (above) is used on all Fridays; on all Sundays: 'risen from the dead'; on Holy Thursday: 'betrayed for us'; on Holy Saturday: 'buried for us'; on the Feast of the Dormition of the Theotokos: 'who came to the death of the Holy Mother and Virgin'; on the feasts of the Holy Cross: 'who was crucified for us'; for the celebration of marriages: 'who took flesh for us', etc.

The Coptic Orthodox, Syriac Orthodox, and other Oriental Orthodox Churches also use the formula 'crucified for us', with minor seasonal variations from the Armenian use.

== Usage ==
=== In the Divine Liturgy ===
When the Trisagion is sung during the Divine Liturgy of the Byzantine Rite, before the Prokeimenon of the Gospel that precedes the Epistle Reading, it is normally sung three times to one of many melodies composed for it. This is followed by singing the Lesser Doxology (Glory Be), the second half of the Trisagion once, and finally the whole Trisagion a fourth time:

Holy God, Holy [and] Mighty, Holy [and] Immortal, have mercy on us.
Holy God, Holy [and] Mighty, Holy [and] Immortal, have mercy on us.
Holy God, Holy [and] Mighty, Holy [and] Immortal, have mercy on us.
Glory to the Father, and to the Son, and to the Holy Spirit, both now and ever and to the ages of ages. Amen.
Holy and Immortal, have mercy on us.
Holy God, Holy and Mighty, Holy and Immortal, have mercy on us.

In the usage of the other, non-Byzantine Eastern Churches, the Trisagion is simply sung thrice, with no Lesser Doxology.

In the East Syriac Rite, used by the Assyrian Church of the East and Syro-Malabar Catholic Church, the Trisagion is sung towards the beginning of the Holy Qurbana, before the Old Testament Readings.

In the West Syriac Rite, used by the Syriac Orthodox Church, Malankara Mar Thoma Syrian Church, Malankara Orthodox Syrian Church, the Syriac Catholic Church, Syro-Malankara Catholic Church and in a hybrid form, the Maronite Church and other derived rites of Syriac Christianity, the Trisagion is sung towards the beginning of the Holy Qurbana after the Old Testament Readings and the Introductory Hymn.

In the Armenian Rite, used by the Armenian Orthodox Church and the Armenian Catholic Church, the Trisagion occurs early in the Divine Liturgy, coming after the troparion of the Monogenes (Only-begotten Son) and the Midday first Antiphon. The choir sings the Trisagion during the lesser entrance of the Gospel Books.

The Trisagion also has a similar place in the liturgies of the Coptic Orthodox Church of Alexandria, the Ethiopian Orthodox Tewahedo Church and Eritrean Orthodox Tewahedo Church, as well as the Coptic Catholic Church and the Ethiopian Catholic Church.

=== As part of the Trisagion Prayers ===
During most services of the Eastern Orthodox Church, the Trisagion is combined with several other prayers to form a unit, often called simply the Trisagion Prayers. This set of prayers forms part of the opening prayers of most services, and is also located within many of the Hours and daily cycle of services.

The full version normally looks like this:

Holy God, Holy [and] Mighty, Holy [and] Immortal, have mercy on us. (three times)
Glory... Both now...
All-holy Trinity, have mercy on us. Lord, cleanse us from our sins. Master, pardon our iniquities. Holy God, visit and heal us for thy Name's sake.
Lord, have mercy. (three times)
Glory... Both now...
Our Father...

While it is possible that the Trisagion has origins in the biblical 'thrice holy' of Isaiah 6:3 (the Sanctus: Holy, holy, holy, Lord of Sabaoth. Heaven and earth are full of your glory', etc.), they are today separate prayers. The latter is used at a different point in the Liturgy (in the Divine Liturgy, during the anaphora).

The Trisagion is also sung at the entry of the coffin into the church at a funeral and when the coffin is carried to the grave. It is also sung at the conclusion of the Great Doxology.

=== Latin Church ===
==== In the Latin liturgy ====
In the Latin Church, the main regular use of the Trisagion is on Good Friday, when it is sung during the ceremony of the Adoration of the Cross, in Improperia. In the Sistine Chapel, the traditional setting was the polyphonic musical setting of da Palestrina. During this service, the hymn is sung by two choirs, alternately in Greek and Latin, originally two antiphonal Greek and Latin choirs, as follows:

Greek (First) Choir: Hágios ho Theós. (Holy God)
Latin (Second) Choir: Sanctus Deus.
Greek (First) Choir: Hágios iskhūrós. (Holy Strong One)
Latin (Second) Choir: Sanctus fortis..
Greek (First) Choir: Hágios āthánatos, eléēson hēmâs. (Holy Immortal One, have mercy on us)
Latin (Second) Choir: Sanctus immortális, miserére nobis.

The hymn is sung in this manner thrice, responding to the first three of twelve reproaches.

In the Latin Church, the Trisagion is employed in the hour of Prime, in the ferial Preces, on ferias of Advent and Lent and on common Vigils. There is a Chaplet to the Holy Trinity used by the Order of the Most Holy Trinity called 'The Trisagion' or the 'Angelic Trisagion', which makes use of both forms of the Trisagion. It also occurs in the Little Office of the Blessed Virgin Mary and in the Chaplet of Divine Mercy.

==== Latin Catholic devotions ====
In the Latin Church, an indulgence of 100 days was once associated with the Trisagion when prayed once a day together with the Sanctus, with a contrite heart to adore the Holy Trinity.

The Trisagion, with minor additions, is a part of the Chaplet of the Divine Mercy:

Holy God, Holy Mighty One, Holy Immortal One, have mercy on us and on the whole world.

Sometimes referred to as the 'Holy God prayer', it is said near the end of the chaplet.

=== Anglican Communion ===
==== Book of Common Prayer ====
A paraphrase of the Trisagion was used in the anthem "In the midst of life" found in the graveside burial liturgy in the first Book of Common Prayer and subsequent revisions, including those in 1552, 1559, 1604, and 1662. The form found in the 1662 prayer book is:

In the midst of life we are in death: of whom may we seek for succour, but of thee, O Lord, who for our sins art justly displeased? Yet, O Lord God most holy, O Lord most mighty, O holy and most merciful Saviour, deliver us not into the bitter pains of eternal death.

The Episcopal Church's 1979 Book of Common Prayer introduced the Trisagion into the Eucharist in both Rite One and Rite Two as part of the Word of God. In Rite One it follows the Summary of the Law. In Rite Two it can be used as an alternative to the Kyrie eleison, which follows the Collect for Purity and precedes the Collect of the Day. The form of the Trisagion found in the 1979 BCP is as follows:

Holy God,

Holy and Mighty, Holy Immortal One,

Have mercy upon us.

==== Common Worship ====
In Common Worship used by the Church of England, the Trisagion is used principally as a concluding prayer of the Litany in the following form:

Holy God, holy and strong, holy and immortal, have mercy upon us.

It is also used in the Good Friday liturgy in the same way as in the Roman Catholic Church.

== Other languages ==
=== African ===
Afrikaans:

Heilige God, Heilige Sterke, Heilige Onsterflike, Ontferm U oor ons.

Amharic (Ethiopia):

ቅዱስ ፡ እግዚአብሔር ፡ ቅዱስ ፡ ኃያል ፡ ቅዱስ ፡ ሕያው ፡ የማይሞት ፡ አቤቱ ፡ ይቅር ፡ በለን ።
Qədus ʾƎgziäbḥer, Qədus Ḫayal, Qədus Ḥəyaw, Yämaymot, ʾÄbetu Yəqər Bälän.

Coptic (Egypt):

ϥ̀ⲟ̀ⲩⲁⲃ ⲛ̀ϭⲓ Ⲡ̀ⲛⲟⲩⲧⲉ: ϥ̀ⲟ̀ⲩⲁⲃ ⲛ̀ϭⲓ Ⲡⲉⲧϫⲱⲣⲉ: ϥ̀ⲟ̀ⲩⲁⲃ ⲛ̀ϭⲓ Ⲡⲉⲧⲙⲟⲩ ⲁⲛ
efouab enchi Epnoute: efouab enchi Petgore: efouab enchi Petmou an

Ge'ez (Classical Ethiopic):

ቅዱስ ፡ እግዚአብሔር ፡ ቅዱስ ፡ ኃያል ፡ ቅዱስ ፡ ሕያው ፡ ዘኢይመውት ፡ ተሣሃለነ ፡ እግዚኦ ።
Qədus ʾƎgziäbḥer, Qədus Ḫayal, Qədus Ḥəyaw, Zäʾiyəmäwət, Täśahalänä ʾƎgzio.

Tigrinya:

ቅዱስ ፡ እግዚኣብሔር ፡ ቅዱስ ፡ ኃያል ፡ ቅዱስ ፡ ዘይመውት ፡ ሕያው ፡ ይቕረ ፡ በለልና ።
Qədus ʾƎgziäbḥer, Qədus Ḫayal, Qədus Ḥəyaw, Zäyəmäwət, Yəꝗər Bäläləna.

=== Asian ===
Arabic:

قدوس الله، قدوس القوي، قدوس الذي لا يموت ارحمنا
Quddūsun Allāh, Quddūsun al-qawī, Quddūsun alladhī lā yamūt urḥamnā.

Cebuano:

Balaan nga Diyos, Balaan nga Hingpit sa Kagamhanan, Balaan nga Wala’y Katapusan, kaloy-i kami.

Santos nga Dios, Santos nga Hingpit sa Kagamhanan, Santos nga Wala'y Katapusan, kaloy-i kami.

Chinese:

至聖之上帝，至聖及大能之上帝，至聖及永生之上帝，憐憫我們。 (Traditional characters)
至圣之上帝，至圣及大能之上帝，至圣及永生之上帝，怜悯我们。 (Simplified characters)
Zhì shèng zhī Shàngdì, zhì shèng jí dà néng zhī Shàngdì, zhì shèng jí yǒngshēng zhī Shàngdì, liánmǐn wǒmen. (pinyin)
zi3 sing3 zi1 soeng6dai3， zi3 sing3 kap6 daai6nang4 zi1 soeng6dai3， zi3 sing3 kap6 wing5sang1 zi1 soeng6dai3， lin4man5 ngo5mun4 (jyutping)

Tagalog:

Banál na Diyós, Banál na Puspós ng Kapángyarihan, Banál na Waláng-Hanggán, maawà Ka sa amin.

Hebrew:

אלהים הקדוש, גבור הקדוש, אל-עולם הקדוש: רחם נא
Elohim HaQádosh, Guibor HaQádosh, El-Olam HaQádosh: Ráḥem Ná.

Hindi:

पवित्र परमेश्वर, पवित्र बलवान, पवित्र अमर, हम पर दया कर।.
pavitra parmeshwar, pavitra balwan, pavitra amr, hum par daya kar.

Ilocano:

Nasantoan a Dios, Nasantoan a Mannakabalin, Nasantoan nga Awan Inggana, Kaasiannakami.

Indonesian:

Allah Mahakudus, Sang Kuasa Mahakudus, Sang Baka Mahakudus, kasihanilah kami.

Japanese:

聖なる神, 聖なる勇毅, 聖なる常生の者や、我等を憐れめよ。
Seinaru Kami, Seinaru Yūki, Seinaru Jōseinomonoya, Warerao Awaremeyo.

Korean:

거룩하신 하느님이여, 거룩하고 전능하신 이여, 거룩하고 영원하신 이여, 우리를 불쌍히 여기소서.
Georukhasin Haneunimiyo, Georukhago Jeonneunghan Iyo, Georukhago Yeongwonhashin Iyo, Urirul Bulsanghi Yeogisoseo.

Malayalam:

ദൈവമേ നീ പരിശുദ്ധനാകുന്നു, ബലവാനേ നീ പരിശുദ്ധനാകുന്നു മരണമിലാത്തവനേ നീ പരിശുദ്ധനാകുന്നു ഞങ്ങൾക്കുവേണ്ടി ക്രൂശിക്കപ്പെട്ടവനേ ഞങ്ങളോട് കരുണ ചെയണമേ.
Holy are Thou, o God. Holy are Thou, o Mighty One. Holy are Thou, o Immortal One, crucified for us. Have mercy on us.

Marathi:

पवित्र देवा, पवित्र शक्तिमान, पवित्र अमर्त्या, आम्हावर दया कर.
Pavitra Deva, Pavitra Shaktiman, Pavitra Amartyaa, Aamhaavar Daya Kar.

East Syriac:

ܩܰܕܺܝܫܰܐ ܐܰܠܰܗܰܐ ܩܰܕܺܝܫܰܐ ܚܰܝܠܬܰܢܰܐ ܩܰܢܕܺܝܫܰܐ ܠܐܰ ܡܰܝܽܘܬܰܐ ܐܶܬܪܰܚܰܡ ܥܠܰܝܢ
Qadisha Alaha, Qadisha Haylthana, Qadisha La Mayutha, 'ithraham 'alayn.

West Syriac: ܩܰܕܺܝܫܰܬ ܐܰܠܳܗܳܐ ܩܰܕܺܝܫܰܬ ܚܰܝܠܬܳܢܳܐ ܩܰܕܺܝܫܰܬ ܠܐܳ ܡܳܝܽܘܬܳܐ ܐܶܬܪܰܚܰܡ ܥܠܰܝܢ

Qadishath Aloho, Qadishath Haylthono, Qadishath Lo Moyutho, ethraham 'alayn.
(Holy God, Holy and Strong, Holy and Immortal, have mercy on us.)

Chavacano:

Santo Dios, Santo Mapuersa, Santo Imortal, tene lastima kanamon.

Vietnamese:

Lạy Thiên Chúa Chí Thánh, Đấng Toàn Năng Chí Thánh, Đấng Bất Tử Chí Thánh, xin thương xót chúng con.

=== European ===
Albanian:

Shenjt Perëndi, Shenjt i fuqishëm, Shenjt i pavdekshëm, mëshirona. (Amongst the Albanian Orthodox in America, "Pavdekur", or "Undying" is used as opposed to "pavdekshëm")

Classical Armenian:

Սուրբ Աստուած, սուրբ եւ հզօր, սուրբ եւ անմահ, որ խաչեցար վասն մեր, ողորմեա մեզ։
Soorp Asdvadz, soorp yev hzor, soorp yev anmah, vor khatchetsar vasn mer, vołormya mez։
"Holy God, Holy and mighty, Holy and immortal, who wast crucified for our sake, have mercy on us."
Սուրբ Աստուած, սուրբ եւ հզօր, սուրբ եւ անմահ, որ յարեար ի մեռելոց, ողորմեա մեզ։
Soorp Asdvadz, soorp yev hzor, soorp yev anmah, vor haryar i meṙelots, vołormya mez։
"Holy God, Holy and mighty, Holy and immortal, who didst rise from the dead, have mercy on us."

Belarusian:

Сьвяты Божа, Сьвяты Моцны, Сьвяты Несьмяротны, памілуй нас. (Cyrillic orthography)
Śviaty Boža, Śviaty Mocny, Śviaty Nieśmiarotny, pamiłuj nas. (Latin orthography)

Bulgarian:

Светий Боже, Светий Крепки, Светий Безсмъртни, помилуй нас!
Svetij Bože, Svetij Krepki, Svetij Bezsmărtni, pomiluj nas!

Church Slavonic:

Old Church Slavonic:

свѧтꙑи боже · свѧтꙑи крѣпъкꙑи · свѧтꙑи бесъмрьтьнꙑи · помилоуи насъ ⁘
svętyi bože, svętyi krěpŭkyi, svętyi bezsŭmrĭtĭnyi, pomilui nasŭ.

Russian Church Slavonic:

Свѧты́й Бо́же, Свѧты́й Крѣ́пкїй, Свѧты́й Безсме́ртный, поми́лꙋй на́съ.
Traditionally written with titlos: Ст҃ы́й Бж҃е, Ст҃ы́й Крѣ́пкїй, Ст҃ы́й Безсме́ртный, поми́лꙋй на́съ.
Svjatyj Bože, Svjatyj Kriepkij, Svjatyj Bezsmertnyj, pomiłuj nas.

Croatian:

Sveti Bože, Sveti Jaki, Sveti Besmrtni, smiluj nam se.

Danish:

Hellige Gud, hellige Stærke, hellige Udødelige, forbarm Dig over os.

Dutch:

Heilige God, Heilige Sterke, Heilige Onsterfelijke, Ontferm U over ons.

Estonian:

Püha Jumal, püha Vägev, püha Surematu, halasta meie peale!

Finnish:

Pyhä Jumala, Pyhä Väkevä, Pyhä Kuolematon, armahda meitä.

French:

Saint Dieu, Saint Fort, Saint Immortel, aie pitié de nous.

Georgian:

წმინდაო ღმერთო, წმინდაო ძლიერო, წმინდაო უკვდავო, შეგვიწყალენ ჩვენ.
Ts'mindao Ghmerto, Ts'mindao Dzliero, Ts'mindao Uk'vdavo, shegvits'qalen chven.

German:

Heiliger Gott, heiliger Starker, heiliger Unsterblicher, erbarme dich unser.

Hungarian:

Szent Isten, Szent Erős, Szent Halhatatlan, irgalmazz nekünk!

Icelandic:

Heilagi Guð, heilagi Sterki, heilagi Ódauðlegi, miskunna þú oss.

Italian:

Santo Dio, Santo forte, Santo immortale, abbi pietà di noi.
Dio santo, Dio forte, Dio immortale, abbi pietà di noi.

Low Mari:

Святой Юмо, Святой Куатле, Святой Колыдымо, мемнам серлаге.
Svyatoy Yumo, Svyatoy Kuatle, Svyatoy Kolydymo, memnam serlage.

Macedonian:

Свети Боже, Свети Крепки, Свети Бесмртни, помилуј нè.
Sveti Bože, Sveti Krepki, Sveti Besmrtni, pomiluj ne!

Maltese:

Qaddis Alla, Qaddis Qawwi, Qaddis Immortali, ħenn għalina.
Alla Qaddis, Alla Qawwi, Alla Immortali, ħenn għalina.

Norwegian:

Hellige Gud, hellige Sterke, hellige Udødelige, forbarm Deg over oss.

Polish:

Święty Boże, Święty Mocny, Święty Nieśmiertelny, zmiłuj się nad nami.

Portuguese:

Santo Deus, Santo Poderoso, Santo Imortal, tende piedade de nós.

Romanian:

Sfinte Dumnezeule, Sfinte Tare, Sfinte Fără de Moarte, miluieşte-ne pe noi.

Russian:

Святый Боже, Святый Крепкий, Святый Бессмертный, помилуй нас!
Svyaty Bozhe, Svyaty Krepky, Svyaty Bessmertny, pomiluy nas!

Serbian:

Свети Боже, Свети Крепки, Свети Бесмртни, помилуј нас. (Cyrillic orthography)
Sveti Bože, Sveti Krepki, Sveti Besmrtni, pomiluj nas. (Latin orthography)

Slovak:

Svätý Bože, Svätý Silný, Svätý Nesmrteľný, zmiluj sa nad nami.

Spanish:

Santo Dios, Santo Fuerte, Santo Inmortal, ten piedad de nosotros.

Swedish:

Helige Gud, helige starke, helige odödlige, förbarma Dig över oss.

Turkish:

Kutsal Tanrı, Kutsal Kudretli, Kutsal Ölümsüz, bize merhamet göster.

Ukrainian:

Святий Боже, Святий Кріпкий, Святий Безсмертний, помилуй нас.
Svâtij Bože, Svâtij Krìpkij, Svâtij Bezsmertnij, pomiluj nas. (ISO 9 transliteration)
Sviatyi Bozhe, Sviatyi Kripkyi, Sviatyi Bezsmertnyi, pomylui nas. (English transilteration)

== Anti-Trisagion ==
Some feasts call for replacing the Trisagion in the Divine Liturgy with an alternative invocation known as an Anti-Trisagion. The variants of the hymn include:

- "Before Thy Cross we bow down in worship, Master, and we glorify Thy Holy Resurrection."
- "As many as have been baptised into Christ have put on Christ. Alleluia." – from Galatians 3:27

== Sources ==
- Liber Usualis Missae et Officii: Paris n.d.
- Kazhdan, Alexander (1991). Oxford Dictionary of Byzantium. Vol. III. Oxford University Press.
- Parry, Ken; David Melling, eds. (1999). The Blackwell Dictionary of Eastern Christianity. Malden, Massachusetts.: Blackwell Publishing. ISBN 0-631-23203-6.
- Price, Richard; Gaddis, Michael (2007). The Acts of the Council of Chalcedon (PDF). Liverpool University Press. ISBN 978-1-84631-100-0. Archived from the original (PDF) on 11 February 2014.
