= Liturgical calendar of the Syro-Malabar Catholic Church =

The Syro-Malabar Church is a Catholic Church sui iuris of the East Syriac Rite that adheres to the following calendar for the church's liturgical year. Like other liturgical calendars, the Syro-Malabar calendar loosely follows the sequence of pivotal events in the life of Jesus.

== Liturgical seasons ==
The Syro-Malabar liturgical year opens with the season of Annunciation, which begins on the Sunday between November 27 and December 3. This day corresponds to the First Sunday of Advent in the Western Roman Rite tradition.

The liturgical year is divided into the following nine seasons.

	Season	Theme	Start date	Duration
1	Annunciation മംഗളവാര്‍ത്തക്കാലം ܕܣܘܼܒܵܪܵܐ (Subara)	Mystery of creation, the fall of man, the birth of the forerunner, and the mystery of incarnation	The Sunday between November 27 and December 3	3–4 weeks
2	Nativity പിറവിക്കാലം یلدا (Yelda)	Birth of Jesus, presentation in the temple, Holy innocents, Holy Magi	December 25	1–2 weeks
3	Epiphany ദനഹാക്കാലം ܕܕܸܢܚܵܐ (Denha)	Baptism of Jesus, proclamation of the son of man, and public ministry	The Sunday between January 2 and 6; otherwise January 6, if no such Sunday exists	4–9 weeks
4	Great Fast നോമ്പുകാലം ܕܨܵܘܡܵܐ ܪܲܒܵܐ (Sawma Ramba)	Passion and death of Jesus	The 7th Sunday before Easter (Note: In the Syro-Malabar calendar, Lent starts one week earlier than it does in the Roman Rite tradition.)	7 weeks
5	Resurrection ഉയിര്‍പ്പുകാലം ܕܲܩܝܵܡܬܹܗܿ ܕܡܵܪܲܢ (Qyamta)	Resurrection, victory over sin, death and evil	Easter Sunday	7 weeks
6	Apostles ശ്ലീഹാക്കാലം ܕܲܫܠܝ݂ܚܹܐ (Slihe)	Pentacost, coming of the Holy Spirit, and the new covanent	Pentecost Sunday (the 7th Sunday after Easter)	7 weeks
7	Summer കൈത്താക്കാലം ܕܩܲܝܛܵܐ (Qaita)	Growth of the Church, remembrance of the martyrs and apostles	The 7th Sunday after Pentecost	7 weeks
8	Elijah– Holy Cross–Moses ഏലിയാ - സ്ലീവാ - മൂശക്കാലങ്ങള്‍ ܕܐܹܠܝ݂ܵܐ ܘܲܨܠܝ݂ܒ݂ܵܐ (Elijah, Sliba, Muse)	Transfiguration, exaltation of the Cross and the second coming of Jesus	The 14th Sunday after Pentecost	6–11 weeks
9	Dedication of the Church പള്ളിക്കൂദാശക്കാലം ܕܩܘ݂ܕܵܫ ܥܹܕܬܵܐ (Qudas Edta)	Dedication of the Church, eternal life and reward	The Sunday between October 30 and November 5	4 weeks

Although the eighth season (Elijah–Cross–Moses) is considered one of the nine, it is also regarded as a combination of the three distinct seasons that are named (Elijah, Cross, and Moses).

The modern day foundation of liturgical calendar was compiled in 1862 by Saint Kuriakose Elias Chavara, while serving as Vicar General for the Syrian Catholics of Malabar.

== Holy days of obligation ==
In the Syro-Malabar Church, there are 6 Holy days of obligation (കടമുള്ള ദിവസങ്ങൾ):

1. Epiphany ദനഹാ പെരുന്നാൾ (January 6)
2. Sts. Peter and Paul ശ്ലീഹന്മാരായ പത്രോസിന്റെയും പൗലോസിന്റെയും തിരുനാൾ (June 29)
3. The Ascension of Our Lord ഈശോമിശിഹായുടെ സ്വർഗ്ഗാരോഹണം (sixth Thursday after Easter)
4. St. Thomas Day ദുക്റാന (July 3)
5. The Assumption of the Blessed Virgin Mary കന്യാമറിയത്തിന്റെ സ്വർഗ്ഗാരോഹണം (August 15)
6. Christmas ക്രിസ്മസ് (December 25)

== Liturgical Lents ==
The Syro-Malabar Church proposes the following days of fasting to the faithful:

Name	Theme	Dates
25 Days' Lent	Repeant for the fall of man; preparation for the incarnation	December 1–24
Rogation of the Ninivites Three Days' Lent	Repeant and return to the Lord	The third Monday, Tuesday, and Wednesday before the beginning of Lent
Great Lent	Part 1: Preparation for the great passion mirroring the 40 day fast of Jesus in the desert; Part2: In remembrance of the passion of Christ	Season of Lent; Part 1: The first Monday or Ash Monday to Sixth Friday (40 days); Part 2: Lazarus Saturday (6th Saturday; a day before Palm Sunday) to Holy Saturday; (no break in-between the two parts)
Fifteen Days' Lent	Remembrance of the Assumption of Our Lady	August 1–14
Eight Days' Lent	Remembrance of the Nativity of Our Lady	September 1–7

== See also ==
- Saint Thomas Christians
- Knanaya
- Syro-Malankara Catholic Church
