= Syro-Malabaric Rite =

Indian usage of the East Syriac Rite

The Syro-Malabaric Rite, also called the Malabar Chaldean Rite, is the Indian usage of the East Syriac Rite. It is currently employed in the Syro-Malabar Church, an Eastern catholic church of East Syriac Rite based in India. It originally developed as the rite of the Saint Thomas Christians of South India, who were part of the Church of the East, incorporating indigenous cultural elements into the East Syriac Rite. It was widely latinized following the Portuguese conquest in the 16th century. The Catholic Church officially began efforts to restore the ancient liturgy in the latter half of the 19th century. Since the last half of the 20th century there is an ongoing conflict between those who call for complete restoration of the pre-16th century rite and those who argue for a reformed Indianized rite or a brand new form of liturgy.

Anuradhapura version of Saint Thomas Cross

== History ==
=== Pre-16th century ===
There are only a few records of the worship practices of the Saint Thomas Christians before the 16th century. One tradition holds that the Syro-Chaldean rite was spread in Malabar by Mesopotamian Christian immigrants led by Knai Thoma, who are believed to have arrived on the Malabar coast in the 4th century. These traditions are unclear about the rite of the Christian community that is believed to have existed in Malabar before this event. There are those who argue that that the original rite was one with a Semitic background, while others argue that a purely indigenous rite could have been prevalent. The first direct historical accounts of the Christian community in South India are extant only since the 6th century.

The Chronicles of Seert records that Ma'na, a 6th century East Syriac metropolitan of Rev Ardashir in Pars, sent religious books and translations of the Greek treatises of Diodore and Theodore in Pahlavi to the churches of India and its environs. A parallel 6th century account of the Christian communities along the Malabar coast, in Sri Lanka and the other islands of the Indian Ocean has been recorded by Cosmas Indicopleustus following his visit to India.

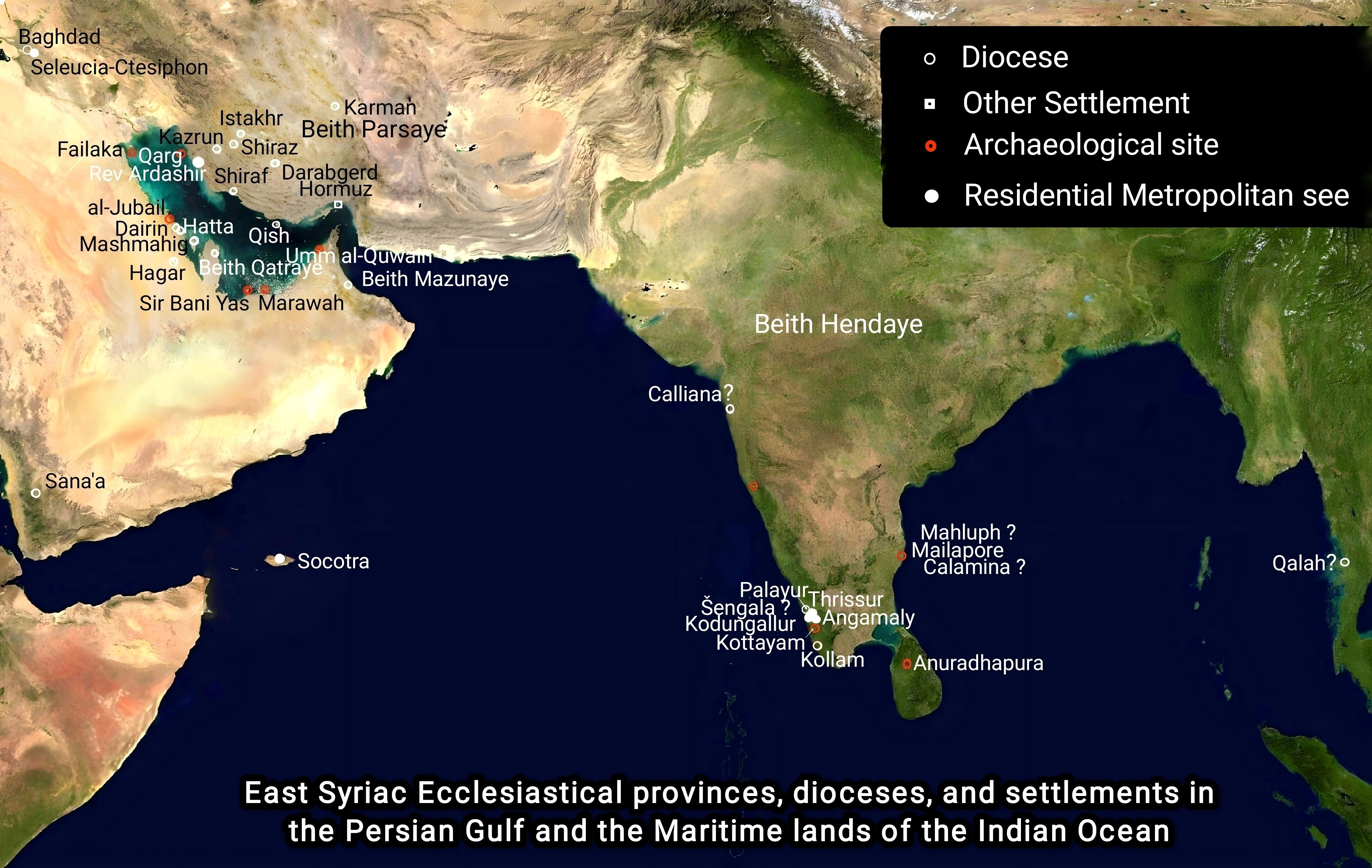
The East Syriac metropolitan provinces, dioceses, and other centers along the transoceanic routes in the Indian Ocean

It is believed that the Indian Christians adopted a form of the East Syriac rite in use in Persia, incorporating elements adapted to the cultural characteristics of southern India. This may also have been influenced by the Persian Christian migration to Malabar led by Sabor and Aproth in the 9th century.

=== 16th century ===
It is only from the 16th century that clearer and more extensive records of the Malabar Christians and the rituals prevalent among them are available. The main source for this is the accounts of the Portuguese who were working in Malabar at that time. The Udayamperoor Synod, which took place in 1599, and the accounts of the following years shed more light on the Syro-Malabaric Rite in the 16th century.

==== Architectural style of churches ====
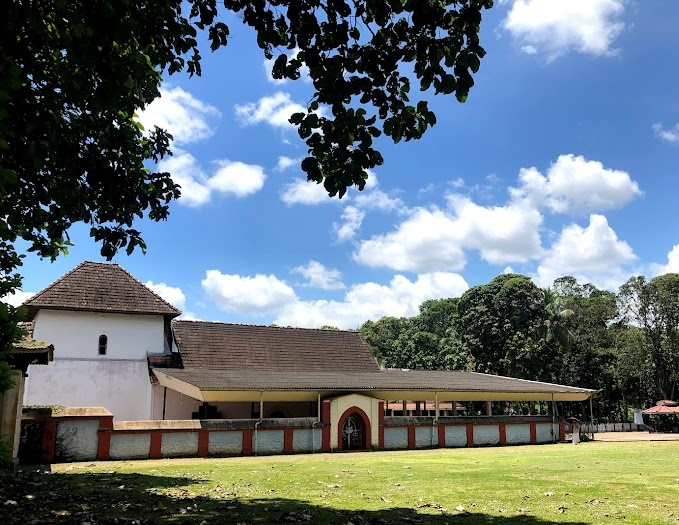
Kanjirapally Akkarapally, the only Syro Malabar church that currently exists in the old style without a façade

Francisco Roz, a Portuguese missionary and metropolitan who worked in Malabar in the 16th and 17th centuries, gives a description of the architectural style of the Saint Thomas Christian churches. Christian churches were also built in the unique architectural style of Malabar. From the outside, the churches looked similar to temples. The crosses placed in front of the church and on top of the roof helped in distinguishing them from non-Christian buildings of worship. The churches were built in east-west direction. The sanctuary of the church, called the Madbaha, was located at the easternmost side. On the southern side of the Madbaha was the baptistery, and on the northern side was a place for baking the bread for Holy Qurbāna. In some church, the baking of bread was done over a room above the Madbaha. The prepared bread was placed in a lotus leaf basket tied with string and taken down to the Madbaha. The Madbaha was a narrow room containing an altar for the offering of Holy Qurbāna. Its main door to the Madbaha was veiled. The veil was thrown open only during the Holy Qurbāna. No one except the priests was allowed to enter it. There were no pictures or figures inside the church except for the cross.

Yāqōv Avūna, the Metropolitan of Kodungallur, was the first to call for churches to be built in the Portuguese style, succumbing to pressure from the Portuguese. The churches built or rebuilt by the Portuguese were followed their architectural style. It was during this time that façades for churches began to be built. Over time, intricately carved raredos containing figures and images began to be installed in the Madbaha of churches. The pulpit and the cast bells were also contributions from the Portuguese.

==== Liturgical language ====
The liturgy of the Malabar Christians was entirely in the Eastern dialect (Chaldean) of the Syriac language. Manuscripts of the Holy Qurbāna, other sacraments, liturgies, and the Holy Bible were written in the East Syriac (Madnhaya) script. In addition to this, there was also a style called 'Karśoni', which was used to write Malayalam in the Syriac script for recording rubrics and other purposes outside of worship.

The Portuguese worked hard to make Latin the language of worship for Christians. The Franciscan seminary established in Kodungallur admitted young Christians, taught them Latin, and made them priests. But the Saint Thomas Christians were not willing to accept these priests who did not know the Syriac language. This often led to clashes with the Portuguese. The Portuguese lamented that the Saint Thomas Christians did not accept anything that was not in Syriac. The Portuguese then changed their policy and brought in priests, including Francisco Roz, who were experts in Syriac, and taught the Syriac language in the new Jesuit seminary established at Vaippicotta. They spearheaded a campaign by which the liturgical books of the Syro-Malabar Christians were examined and revised, adapted to the Latin liturgy, and the Latin liturgical books were translated into Syriac and put into practice.

==== Scripture ====
The Peshitta (Pśītta), the Syriac translation of the Holy Bible, was the religious scripture of the Saint Thomas Christians. There were some differences between the Peshitta, which was popular in Malabar, and the Vulgate, the official Bible translation of the Latin Catholic Church. These differences were in the number and structure of the books. The books of the Maccabees were not included in the manuscripts of the Old Testament of the Syro-Malabar Christians. The Revelation and the 2nd and the 3rd epistles of John, 2nd Epistle of Peter, the Epistle of Jude, and the part about the woman caught in adultery in the Gospel of John were also not in the Peshitta New Testament manuscripts. Roz records that when he asked Metropolitan Abraham about this difference, he replied that these parts, which are not found in the Malabar manuscripts, were in use in Persia. After the Synod of Udayamperoor, the Portuguese revised the Peshitta Bible of the Syro-Malabar Christians and adapted it to the Latin Vulgate.

==== Priesthood ====
The same priestly system that existed elsewhere in the Church of the East was also present among the Saint Thomas Christians. The main priestly orders were the bishop, archdeacon, presbyter, deacon (Mśamśāna), subdeacon (Hyapdiāqōna), and lector (Qārōya).

The spiritual leadership of the Saint Thomas Christians was held by those who had been sent from Assyria by the East Syriac patriarchs. The chief among them was known as the Metropolitan of All India. In addition to the metropolitan, there were also three suffragan bishops appointed. Gouvea and Roz record that the suffragan dioceses were Socotra and 'Masina'. Although Christians in India had the right to freely elect metropolitans as they were a metropolitan province, there is no evidence to determine whether this was ever implemented.

Since the metropolitans were foreigners, a local priest was appointed to the position of Archdeacon of All India to oversee the administration of the church and the community. An archdeacon was an unmarried priest. He was also known as a 'Jātikkukaṟttavyan' (stakeholder of the community).

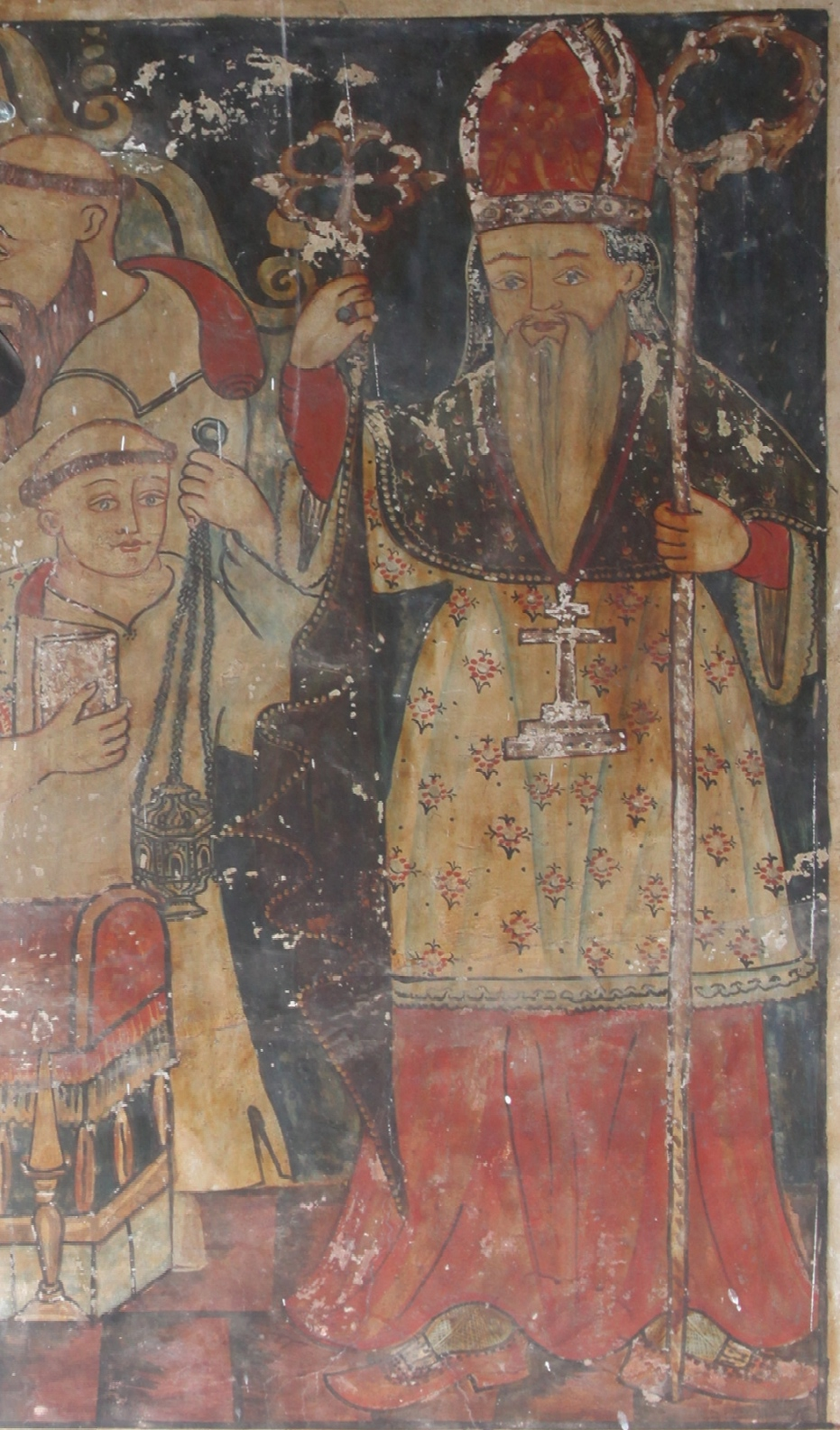
A painting believed to be of Archdeacon Giwargis of Christ

A Saint Thomas Christian priest was known as a Kathanar. Roz suggests that the word comes from the Syriac word kahanan, which means priest. A priest was also known as Kaśīśa. A deacon was called the Śemmaśan. The priestly title was conferred in two stages, first the positions of lector, subdeacon, and deacon together, and secondly the presbyterate.

Like other Eastern churches, the priests of the Saint Thomas Christians also led a married life. However, unlike other traditions, in the East Syriac tradition, marriage was permitted even after receiving the priesthood. For this reason, in addition to married people being ordained as priests, there was also a practice of remarriage among priests whose wives had died. The wife of a priest was known as Kathanarathi. Roz records that priests' wives assisted in ceremonies such as the baptism of women.

The Portuguese strongly opposed the married priesthood of Syrian priests. They forbade priests who graduated from the seminaries they founded from marrying. The Udayamperoor Synod recommended that married priests completely abandon their wives and children.

The Portuguese introduced Latin-style priestly ordinations instead of the traditional East Syriac rite, and began the practice of clerical tonsure instead of the traditional kudumi.

==== Baptism ====
Among the Christians, there was baptism of infants and adults. Baptism was usually given on the 40th day after the birth of a child. Those adults who were not baptized in this way were baptized when they had the opportunity. Baptism was administered by priests. During the baptism of infants, an adult male and female relatives were selected as 'Talatoṭṭappan' and 'Talatoṭṭamma' respectively. They recite the prayers for the infant being baptized and maintain a spiritual connection with the infant.

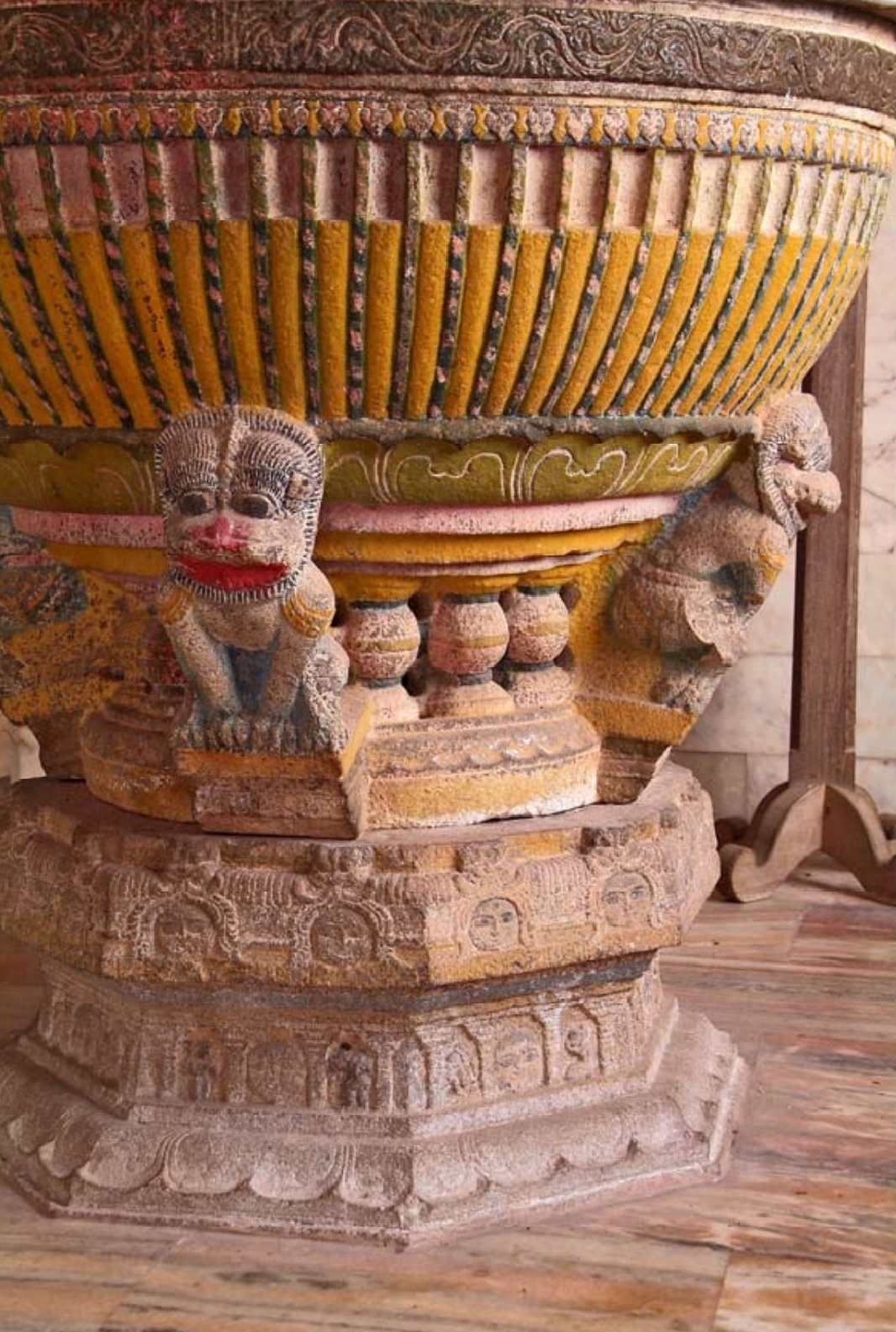
Old baptismal font at the old Church in Akaparamba; local sculptural elements

The ritual of baptism also included anointing with oil. This was performed in the baptistry located to the south of the Madbaha inside the church. The baptismal font is filled with water and the blessed in the name of the Holy Trinity. After this, ordinary oil is applied to the child's body and the child is immersed in the baptismal font thrice. Then the child is wiped dry and the sign of the cross is drawn on the forehead, arms, legs, chest, and back with holy oil of unction. The child is then dressed in white. After this, another prayer is said over the water remaining in the baptismal font and it is drained off. The baptism ceremony was performed during Holy Qurbāna. After the baptism, the baby was also given Holy Communion. The same ritualistic rules are followed when baptizing adults. Roz records that the wives of priests assisted during the baptism of women.

The Portuguese, accusing the Christians of inadequacies and superstitions in their baptismal rite, imposed the Latin-style baptismal rite on them and prohibited Holy Communion and anointing oil to their children. Portuguese missionaries prohibited giving Holy Communion to children until they received their first communion. They also implemented the practice of placing the baptismal font near the entrance, away from the south side of the sanctuary.

==== Holy Unction ====
There was no distinct sacrament of Confirmation in the East Syriac rite. There was only the oil anointing ceremony that was performed alongside the baptism. For the same reason, the sacrament of confirmation was unfamiliar to Saint Thomas Christians.

Meanwhile, in the Latin Rite, confirmation was a distinct sacrament given upon reaching adulthood. Only the bishops practiced this. The Portuguese forced the Syrian Christians of Malabar to accept the sacrament. Under their pressure, Metropolitan Abraham, with the help of Jesuit priests at the Vaippicotta Seminary, translated the Latin rite of confirmation into Syriac and implemented it. However, as Roz recounts, he did not administer the sacrament to anyone other than the priests he had ordained.

The Udayamperoor Synod and Portuguese missionaries made the sacrament of Confirmation compulsory for older children under the name 'initial unction' ('Tuṭakkatte Opruśma') and translated the rite from Latin to Syriac and performed it.

==== Sacrament of Reconciliation ====
The East Syriac Rite did not have the sacrament of confession as in the Latin Rite. Roz notes that the Christians did not accept confession for the same reason. In the East Syriac rite, the ministry of forgiveness was performed through the sacrament of 'Reconciliation' (Hūzāya) associated with the rite of the Holy Qurbāna. Those who needed to confess their sins in person had the opportunity to approach priests to do so and receive blessings, but that was unusual. In the East Syriac tradition, forgiveness of sins is complete only through the Hūzāya. Roz records that everyone, including children and adults, received Holy Communion.

The Portuguese were the first to attempt to implement and normalize the sacrament of Latin-style confession among Christians. Yaakov Avuna, the Metropolitan of Kodungallur, yielded to their insistence and translated the Latin confessional blessing into Syriac. But it did not gain much popularity. Later, Yawsep Sulaqa prepared and implemented a better translation of it. But Metropolitan Abraham discouraged the practice of confession and withdrew from receiving it himself, Roz states.

The Udayamperoor Synod and Portuguese missionaries made confession compulsory among Christians. They also announced that people who do not confess at least once a year will be excommunicated from the church. They translated and implemented the Order of Confession from the Latin Liturgy into Syriac.

==== The dying, rite of funerals, and post-funeral rituals ====
===== Services for the sick and dying =====
The sacrament of anointing of the sick was not present in the East Syriac rite as it was in the Latin rite. Priests visited the sick and dying and prayed over them with leaves inscribed with the words of Jesus Christ from the Gospels. They were given holy water (Hannāna; 'Hannān water') mixed with some soil collected from the tomb of St. Thomas in Mylapore.

The account of Yawsep the Indian and Portuguese testimonies make it clear that the practice of anointing the dying with holy oil did not exist among the Christians. The Portuguese tried to bring this custom. This was known as 'Oṭuvilatte oprūśma' ('final unction') or 'Antyakūdāśa' ('the sacrament at death'). Rose testifies that although Yawsep Sulaqa translated the Latin rite of this sacrament into Syriac and put it into practice, it was not widely used. Roz adds that Metropolitan Abraham discouraged this and was unwilling to accept it even at his deathbed.

This ritual was made mandatory among Syro-Malabar Christians by Portuguese missionaries through the Udayamperoor Synod. They translated its liturgy from the Latin rite into Syriac and implemented it.

===== Funeral =====
Until the mid-16th century, Christians buried their dead in their homes or privately owned lands. The bodies of saints and monks were buried in churches. Roz records that the bodies of Sabor and Aproth were buried within the chapels along the Madbaha of Tarsapally, Kollam.

Following pressure from the Portuguese, Yaqov Avuna was the first to propose moving graves near churches and establishing cemeteries for this purpose.

===== Post-funeral rites =====
When a death occurred in a household, it was customary for the members of the household to observe a fast (Śṟāddham or Cāttam) for a total of 40 days from the day of the death. In those days, they did not shave their beards or participate in celebrations. They would hold special prayers at the grave and at home for 40 days, inviting a priest to lead the prayers. On the 41st day, the fast was ended ceremoniously by inviting relatives and neighbors and preparing a meal. They then continued the practice of commemorating the deceased once every 30 days until a year had passed since the death. Since then, the anniversary of the deceased would be celebrated every year. On the day of commemoration of the deceased, special prayers were held at the grave and at home, led by a priest.

==== Marriage and family life ====
The sacramental status of marriage in East Syriac Rite is a matter of dispute. According to the accounts given by Portuguese writers, the Saint Thomas Christians did not consider marriage a sacrament. Roz records that they called wedding Peṇṇukeṭṭŭ. Although child marriage was strictly prohibited in East Syriac Rite, it was widespread in Malabar, he adds. According to the prevailing local custom, Saint Thomas Christians also married at a young age. The marriage was arranged by the father of the bride and the father of the groom.

The wedding ceremonies were performed under the auspices of a priest. At the same time, Roz notes that there were also marriages that were conducted using only local customs, and that such marriages were also considered valid. The most popular local custom was for the groom to tie a chain (Tālikeṭṭŭ) around the bride's neck and cover her head with a cloth (Mantṟa kōṭi). In addition, there was a ceremony where the bride and groom poured rice grains into each other's hands. There were other customs of marriage besides this, but the Portuguese took special care to prohibit all of them. They only allowed the Tālikeṭṭŭ and wearing of Mantṟa kōṭi, considering local customs. There was also a tradition of carrying the bride and groom on elephants and carrying them on relatives' shoulders. These were special rights granted by kings.

It was common practice to pay a dowry as part of a marriage. The dowry was paid by the bride's father. There was a provision that if the husband died without issue, the entire dowry had to be returned. The Saint Thomas Christians were monogamous. But if the spouse died, it was common to remarry after a year. Remarriage was permitted for both men and women. The Syrian Christians followed a patrilineal family structure unlike the Nair and Muslim Mappila communities which followed a matrilineal lineage due to their polyandric marital relationships with Nambuthiri Brahmins and Arab sailors respectively. The Syro-Malabar system was similar to that of the Nambuthiris except for the practice of the latter which prohibited the marriage of their boys except the eldest. Jesuit missionary Monserrat, who visited Malabar in the 16th century, recorded that Saint Thomas Christian men had married Nair women as well. (Note: Monserrate's letter to Mercurian. Documenta Indica. Vol. 11. Cochin. 12 January 1579. pp. 516–518. and "Malabar Herald". 6 May 1933.)

==== Fasts ====
The Syro-Malabar Christians observed fasts as prescribed in the East Syriac Rite. Meat, fish, eggs, milk and dairy products, alcohol, and intoxicants including betel leaves were all completely abstained from during the fasting period. During fasting days, the only ate 2 meals a day. In those days, husbands and wives stayed apart and men stopped shaving. During the fasting days, believers gathered together in church for morning and evening prayers.

===== Great Lent =====
The 7 weeks before Easter were observed as Great Lent. These are the days of Season of the 'Great Lent' in the liturgical year. The Sunday that begins the Lent is known as 'Pētturta'. There was no fasting on Sundays. For this reason, the first Monday of Lent was observed as a day of complete fasting. There were relatively long prayer rituals for fasting days in the daily offices. The Friday before 'Ōśāna Sunday' was known as the 40th Friday. The next day commemorated the raising of Lazarus by Jesus Christ. The 40th Friday marked the end of the forty-day fast. The following Saturday was celebrated by distributing sweets. The week from Palm Sunday to Holy Saturday was called the Week of Suffering or the Week of Hāśa. Fasting continued during these days as well. The Friday of Hāśa (Good Friday) was also a day of complete fasting.

===== Three-day fast =====
The 3-day fast, or Nineveh fast, is observed 18 days before the start of Great Lent. This was known as Bāwūsa, which means rogation, and has its origins in Assyria. This was the most notable and ritually important of the fasts observed by the Saint Thomas Christians. For three days, believers sat inside the church and fasted. It was common to read the entire psalter in the Bible in three days. Liturgy of the hours during these days were the longest. On Wednesday, the last day of Lent, the Qudasa of Nestorius was used in the Holy Qurbāna.

===== Yalda Fast =====
The Yalda fast begins 25 days before the feast of the Nativity of Jesus Christ.

===== Other fasts =====
The Slīwa fast is a fast observed in advance of the Feast of the Holy Cross (Slīwa), which was celebrated on September 13 as per the older tradition at the Church of the Holy Sepulchre in Jerusalem.

The 14 days preceding the Feast of the Assumption of the Virgin Mary, on August 15, was a widely observed fast. The Feast of the Transfiguration of Christ was celebrated during this Lent. There was also a practice of fasting and praying in church for seven days leading up to the feast of the Nativity of the Virgin Mary on September 8. This was only observed by women.

The Fast of the Apostles (Slihe) observed Lent for 50 days following the Feast of Pentecost. The last day of this was 'Nusardel', the feast of the 12 apostles which marked the beginning of the Season of Qaita. This fast was optional in observance.

==== Major days ====
The Saint Thomas Christians observed feasts and commemorations according to East Syriac Rite. The feasts were classified as the 'Mārānāya' feasts, or feasts of the Lord, and other feasts. The Mārānāya festivals are Yalda (Nativity), Denha (Epiphany), Ōśāna (Palm Sunday), Pesaha (Maundy Thursday), Hāśa Friday (Good Friday), Qyamta (Resurrection), Sūlaqa (Ascension), Pentecost, Geliāna (Transfiguration), and the Feast of the Finding of the Cross.

===== Nativity =====
The Syro-Malabar Christians celebrated Yalda, the nativity of Jesus Christ, on December 25. The Gregorian calendar was officially adopted by the First Synod of Angamaly, held in 1585 by Metropolitan Abraham. He did this under pressure from the Portuguese. Before that, the Christians used to celebrate according to the Julian calendar as other Eastern churches.

Christians fasted for 24 days before Yalda. The feast was celebrated with a midnight Qurbāna. There was also a practice of procession around the church before Qurbāna. It was customary for the priest to light a fire in a triangular shaped pit in the churchyard, pile the palm leaves used on the previous year's Easter Sunday, and then burn it from its three corners. The priest and the community moved around the burning fire, reciting the angelic hymn, "Praise be to God in the highest," three times, and then entered the church in a circumambulation.

===== Denha =====
The Feast of the Denha, commemorating the baptism of Jesus Christ, was one of the most important feasts for Christians. This festival is celebrated on January 6. It was known as 'Piṇṭikutti' feast in the northern regions and 'Rākkuḷi' feast in the southern regions.

The main ritual of the Piṇṭikutti festival is to decorate the churches and surrounding areas with lamps that are pierced into peeled banana shoots (piṇṭi). It was also common to perform a procession while chanting the phrase 'Ēl payya', which means "God is light", in a melodious voice.

The main ritual of Rākkuḷi is to take a bath at night in the ponds, rivers, and other water bodies in the vicinity of the church. The priest took the cross, dipped it in water, and blessed the water before people immersed themselves in it. It was held to commemorate the baptism of Jesus Christ in the Jordan River.

Meanwhile, the Portuguese celebrated the Feast of the Three Kings (Magi) on January 6 according to the Latin rite. For this reason, the Portuguese tried to turn the Feast of Denha Kings into the Feast of the Three Kings. They promoted parades and other festivals in which the images of the Magi were paraded.

===== Pesaha =====
Maundy Thursday was one of the most important festivals of the Christians. On the day, everyone attended Mass in church. In the evening ceremony, the celebrant washed the feet of 12 men or children. The Qūdāśa of Nestorius was used for Holy Qurbāna on the day. The rites to increase the Holy Malka of the Holy Qurbāna and the Holy oil, which would be needed for a year, were conducted that day under the leadership of the bishop.

It was also customary to prepare bread and make sweet palm-milk (Pāl) preparation at homes. Bread was made from kneaded rice flour without leavening. It was steamed or baked in a pan. Pāl was prepared by heating coconut milk and jaggery. Pesaha was not celebrated in a house where a death occurred for the past one year. They went to other homes and participated in the celebration. Only Christians participated in the Passover celebration.

===== Good Friday =====
The celebration and reception of Holy Qurbana were omitted on the Friday of suffering (Hāśa). The faithful fasted completely on that day.

===== Feast of Resurrection =====
Christians observed a 7-week fast prior to Qyamta, the feast of the resurrection of Jesus Christ. This was known as the Great Lent. Holy Qurbāna was held in churches after midnight on the occasion of the Feast of the Resurrection. The congregation entered the church in a ceremonial procession led by the priest. The Portuguese record that there was a practice of spreading torn fragrant leaves, such as malabathrum leaves, inside the church.

===== Transfiguration =====
The commemoration of the transfiguration of Jesus Christ on Mount Tabor was celebrated under the name Geliāna. Roz records that since this festival fell during the fast preceding the Assumption (Karayēṯṯam) of Virgin Mary, which lasted until August 15, fasting was observed on that day.

===== Feast of the Cross =====
The Syro-Malabar Christians celebrated the Feast of the Slīwa, or the Feast of the Holy Cross, on September 13. This was known as the Feast of the Finding of the Holy Cross. There was also a custom of fasting for 13 days prior to this feast.

In other Christian traditions, September 14 was celebrated instead as the Feast of the Exaltation of the Holy Cross. The Portuguese pressured the Syro-Malabar Christians to make it official.

===== Commemorations of Saints =====
Roz provides a description of the days of commemoration of saints observed by Saint Thomas Christians as under:

Fridays after the Feast of the Nativity

1. Feast of Virgin Mary (Feast of the Appreciation of Mary, Mother of Christ)
2. Commemoration of John the Baptist (Yōhannān Māmdāna)
3. Commemoration of the Apostles Peter (Kēppa) and Paul (Pawlos)
4. Feast of the Four Evangelists (Matthew (Mattāi), Mark (Marqōs), Luke (Lūkka), John (Yōhannān))
5. Stephen (Esteppānōs Sahda)
6. Greek Doctors (Diodorus, Theodorus and Nestorius)
7. Syriac Doctors (Aprem, Narsai and Abraham)
8. Hormizd Ramban - The 15th day after Easter (2nd Monday of Qyamta)

Other significant feasts:

1. George (Gīwargīs Sahada) - April 24
2. Sabor and Aproth - May 19
3. Thomas the Apostle (Duqrāna dTōmāślīha) - July 3 (3rd Kaṟkkiṭakam - relocation of his mortal remains to Edessa), New Sunday (Putuñayaṟ: 2nd Sunday of Qyamta - Thomas' declaration of faith), November 21 (Vṟŭścikam 21 - Thomas' arrival to India), December 18 (Dhaṉu 18 - Commemoration of the death of Saint Thomas or Feast of the bleeding Cross in Mylapore)
4. Kuriakose Sahada and his mother Yūlītta - July 15
5. Hormizd Ramban - September 1

Decree 9 of the 3rd Session of the Udayamperoor Synod prohibited the celebration of the feasts of the East Syriac saints. The names of Diodorus, Theodore, and Nestorius were stroke off from liturgical texts and the books known by their names were gathered and burned. They were replaced by Athanasius of Alexandria, Gregory of Nazianzus, Basil of Caesarea, Chrysostom of Constantinople and Cyril of Alexandria. The names of the Syriac Doctors Narsai and Abraham were also removed in this manner, and books bearing their names were destroyed. Instead, the names of Latin saints Augustine of Hippo, Ambrose of Milan, and Gregory of Rome were introduced. In 10th decree declared Hormizd Ramban a Nestorian heretic and replaced his name by that of Hormizd Sahada.

Decree 25 of the 8th Session declared Mar Sabor and Mar Aproth as Nestorian heretics and forbade the construction of churches, feasts, and vows in their name. The synod also ordered that the churches named after them be renamed after all the saints, starting from the church in Udayamperoor. This could not implemented due to steady opposition from the Christians. Therefore, later, instead of 'All Saints', the Italian twin saints Gervasius and Protasius were chosen. However, the Christians continued to venerate the local saints Sabor and Aproth.

The Latin missionary influence among the Syro-Malabar Christians led to a tendency to misunderstand Kuriakose the Martyr with the Latin saint Deacon Cyriacus. Over time, devotion to Kuriakose, the patron saint of children, gave way to devotion to Infant Jesus, under the influence of the Carmelites.

==== The Order of Holy Qurbana ====
Historian Connolly suggests that the liturgy used by the Syro-Malabar Christians in the 16th century can be sketched from the decrees of the Synod of Udayamperoor. He insists that the Malabar Christians used a form of the East Syriac rite. He adds that what existed in Malabar was a different order from the generally accepted form of the liturgy of the Church of the East. According to Douglas Webb, the Malabar Rite was a modified form of the order commonly used in the East Syrian Church. He also writes that the unique elements may have been added after the general order of the Alqosh usage was deviced.

A heavily latinized form of the East Syriac liturgy, which formed in the years immediately following the Synod of Udayamperoor, was the one that was used by the Saint Thomas Christians throughout the 17th century. After the Synod of Udayamperoor, texts for all the sacraments, except for the Holy Qurbāna and the Liturgy of the Hours, were translated from the Latin Rite into Syriac and used. The missionaries also implemented extensive Latin adaptations within the remaining East Syriac orders. The methods of Qurbāna, such as the 'Mūnnummmēl Rāza' and the 'Pāṭṭŭ Quṟbāṉa' (sung eucharistic liturgy), were also formed during this period.

After the Coonan Cross Oath and the subsequent division of the Christians into two factions, the Paḻayakūṯṯukāṟ and Puttankūṯṯukāṟ, both factions continued this Latinized Syro-Chaldean Malabar liturgy. However, the influence of the Syriac Orthodox missionaries among the Puttankūṯṯukāṟ gradually led to the spread and full acceptance of the West Syriac 'Jacobite' (Yākkōbāya) Rite and liturgy among them, leading to the development of the Malankara Rite usage of Tikrit form of the West Syriac Jacobite Rite. As a result, they stopped using the Syro-Malabar liturgy. But the liturgy of the Paḻayakūṯṯukāṟ remained without any significant alterations. Meanwhile, available manuscripts show that the Puttankūṯṯukāṟ used the order of the Liturgy of the Hours and prayers of the Syro-Malabar Rite up until the 19th century.

Following a split among the Paḻayakūṯṯukāṟ in the 19th century, two distinct Churches emerged: the Chaldean Syrian Church and the Syro-Malabar Church. Among these, the Chaldean Syrian Church removed the Latin elements from their liturgy and adapted it to the liturgy of the Assyrian Church of the East. Meanwhile, the Syro-Malabar Church continued to follow the old Latinized Syro-Malabaric rite. When the Pope completely separated the Syro-Malabar Church from the Latin Church in 1896 and appointed local bishops for it, the defects and anomalies in the Syro-Malabar liturgy of that time began to be addressed. In 1934, the Pope took the ultimate decision to restore the Syro-Malabar Rite to the state it had been in before the Synod of Udayamperoor, and by 1986, the restored order of the Syro-Malabar Qurbana was promulgated.

== Latinization ==
After the arrival of the Portuguese to India, they began efforts to adapt the Syro-Malabaric Rite to the norms of the Latin Church. The period from the 17th to the 20th century was of widespread Latinization of the Syro-Malabaric Rite. There are mainly 3 reasons cited for the forced latinization of the eastern rite. Firstly, since the Saint Thomas Christians were under the Church of the East, they believed that their liturgy contained the Nestorian heresy. Secondly, they found that the Syro-Malabar Rite lacked many of the reforms and devotional practices that developed in the Latin Rite during the Middle Ages. Thirdly and most significantly they believed that the Latin Rite is superior to all other Christian Rites. The process of Latinization in the history of the Syro-Malabaric Rite had 3 stages. These are the 5 decades immediately before the Udayamperoor Synod (Chaldean Catholic period), period that extended from the Udayamperoor Synod to the Coonan Cross Oath (Portuguese-Jesuit period), and the period after the Coonan Cross Oath (Carmelite period).

=== Chaldean Catholic period ===
Before the Udayamperoor Synod, the Jesuit Seminary in Vaippicotta served as the spearhead of the Portuguese missionary pressure for the latinization of the Saint Thomas Christians. The Jesuits of Vaippicotta, who took Syriac as an important subject in their curriculum, attempted to dissect the East Syriac liturgical texts used by the Syro-Malabar Christians in order to find the discrepancies it had with the Latin texts and to edit it in accordance with the Latin rite texts as far as possible. Under their pressure, the Chaldean metropolitans Yawsep Sūlāqa and Abraham agreed to some Latinizations. Webb suggests that Yawsep was the first to add the institutional narrative of the Eucharist, which was not originally present in the Anaphora of Addai and Mari of the Holy Qurbāna. But Yawsep was cautious enough to add it after the service of breaking of the holy bread, without altering the text of the anaphora. Van der Ploeg says that it is more likely that this addition took place in the Middle East itself and that it may have been propagated in Malabar by Yawsep, who was also the brother of the first Chaldean Catholic Patriarch. Later, its position was moved ahead such that it was said before the breaking of bread. Jacob Vellian, a liturgical scholar, suggests that this change may have occurred at the synod held in Angamaly in 1583 under the presidency of Metropolitan Abraham, much before the Udayamperoor Synod.

=== Udayamperoor Synod and the Portuguese Period ===
The main developments in the period from the Synod of Udayamperoor to the Coonan Cross Oath were the liturgy edited by the Synod of Udayamperoor ('the liturgy of Menezes') and the liturgy implemented by Francisco Roz after that. Alexis Menezes, the Archbishop of Goa, had the texts prepared in advance so that to be promulgated as decrees once the synod was over. The Udayamperoor Synod decreed to translate the Latin Rite liturgy for all sacraments, except the Holy Qurbāna, into Syriac and implement it among the Saint Thomas Christians. Only the order of the Holy Qurbāna (Taqsa) and the Liturgy of the Hours were excluded from complete Latinization. But Menezes particularly indulged to make corrections to these as well. The Portuguese's liturgical programme was to completely latinize these too over time, avoiding the immediate protests of the Saint Thomas Christians.

==== Liturgy of Menezes ====
The Udayamperoor Synod, led by Alexis Menezes, proposed approximately 40 changes to the order of the Holy Qurbāna. Among these, 6 were in the Kārozusa (deaconal proclamations), 7 in hymns, 4 in other deaconal proclamations and 1 each in the laity's response, reading of the gospel and the Nicean Creed. Among amendments to the prayers of the priest, 5 were in the pre-anaphoral part, 4 in the anaphora itself and 11 in the variable Huttāme (final blessing or 'sealing' prayer). These changes chiefly intended to replace the East Syriac expressions with Latin theological expressions and terminology. The synod anathematised the Chaldean Catholic Patriarch Šimun IX Denha as a Nestorian heretic and schismatic. It banned the mentioning of the Chaldean Patriarch in the Holy Qurbāna and the Liturgy of the Hours under the pain of excommunication and decreed to add the name of the Pope in his place. The synod also prohibited the referring to the bread and wine as the Holy Body and Blood before the institutional narrative is recited. The anaphoras (Qūdāše) of Diodorus, Theodore, and Nestorius were banned and their manuscripts were ordered to be collected and burned. The synod also banned their commemorations. In the Nicean creed, the synod decreed to replace the East Syriac christological phraseology of Barkyāna with the word of Greek origin Hēumasiōs to make the Creed similar to the Latin version. The synod also adopted the version of the institution narrative as it is in the Latin Rite in place of the version added by Yawsep Sulaqa.

The Udayamperoor Synod also proposed widespread changes in the Syro-Malabaric Liturgy of the Hours. The theology of the East Syriac Church is expressive in its Liturgy of the Hours. Menezes' order was to completely tear out the entire section for the season of the Annunciation from the manuscripts of the order of the Liturgy of the Hours, where this was most evident. The Hudra, which contains all the hymns and prayers used in a year, almost disappeared after the synod. This is chiefly attributed to the widespread destruction of manuscripts that followed the synod. All that remained was a small book called Kaškōl ('Šehimma'), which was the order of liturgy of the hours for ordinary days. Attempts were made to burn and destroy all Syriac manuscripts, except manuscripts of the Holy Bible (Pšitta) and the orders of the Holy Qurbāna and the Liturgy of the Hours. The Feast of the Purification of the Virgin Mary and the candlelight vigils of that day (Candlemas) and litanies were also introduced among the Syro-Malabar Christians in this period.

==== Liturgy of Roz ====
Only 4 elements from the Latin Rite were added to the Syro-Malabaric Rite by the Udayamperoor Synod. The synod convened by Francisco Roz in Angamaly in 1603 made further corrections to this liturgy. The two extant documents of the Taqsa revised by Roz are the Rozian liturgy, published in 1603, and the Rozian statutes of 1606. It was Roz who introduced the practice of beginning the Qurbāna in the name of the Holy Trinity and the drawing of the cross. Some ritual and structural changes were also introduced through the Rozian liturgy to further align the Syro-Malabar liturgy with the Latin liturgy.

=== Discalced Carmelite period ===
The various editions of the Syro-Malabaric Liturgy published during the reign of the Carmelite missionaries are examples of later Latinization. There was no fully unified liturgy among the Paḻayakūṯṯukāṟ, who continued in communion with the Pope and the partially Latinized East Syriac rite after the Coonan Cross Oath. Although attempts were made since 1757 to unify and publish the Syro-Malabar liturgy, differences were widespread among the available manuscripts. At the same time, even many of the local priests were not interested in implementing the East Syriac liturgy of the Chaldean Catholic Church in Malabar. The Chaldeo-Malabaric Missal was printed and published in Rome in 1774. (Note: Ordo Chaldaicus Missae Beatorum Apostolorum, juxta ritum Ecclesiae Malabaricae) In 1775, the publishing of other liturgical texts such as a lectionary, a Propria, and formula of sacraments followed. (Note: Ordo Chaldaicus Rituum et Lectionum juxta morem Ecclesiae Malabarica) Along with these, more prayers from the Latin Rite were added. It included the prayers from the Latin Rite particular to Ash Wednesday, Palm Sunday, Maundy Thursday, Good Friday, and the Feast of the Purification of the Virgin Mary. Elements from the Maronite Rite were also incorporated into it. (Note: The hymn 'Abba da kušta' or 'Father of Truth' of Jacob of Serug) All feasts, except July 3, December 18, and the 3-day fast, were incorporated from the Latin Rite and the variable prayers (Propria) peculiar to the East Syriac Rite were abandoned. This edition also avoided the variable Turgāme preceding the reading of the Holy Gospel. In short, this liturgy published by the Carmelites in 1774, replaced the traditional East Syriac liturgical calendar with the Latin calendar in the Taqsa. It was successively revised and published in 1775 and 1845, with further amendments.

==== Beccinelli's reforms ====
The next set of major changes in the Syro-Malabaric Rite was carried out by Bernardine Beccinelli, who was the Vicar Apostolic of Verapoly from 1853 to 1868. Realizing that despite the existence of printed liturgical texts, Syriac priests throughout his jurisdiction were performing liturgy in various ways, he issued an order entitled 'Remedies against disorders'. He also applied the 5 liturgical colors (white, red, black, green, and purple) of the Latin Rite in the Syro-Malabaric Rite. It was Beccinelli who banned the practice of lighting fires and walking around them in the rites of the Yalda (Nativity) feast. But this custom persisted despite this ban in many places.

Beccinelli implemented the monthly devotions in the name of the Virgin Mary and Saint Joseph, and the 'Novēna' rituals in the name of other saints. Beccinelli also tried to spread the practice of 'Rosary' in homes. Another practice that the Portuguese missionaries promoted with special interest after the Udayamperoor Synod was the veneration of statues and images. Over time, this became very popular among the Nasranis and involved intense rituals such as opening the casket, pouring of milk, bathing the statue, anointing with milk, anointing with ghee, carrying the statues, closing the casket, and wearing of gold and silver ornaments (Tiruvābharaṇam). Beccinelli tried to ban such intense devotional practices.

==== Reforms by Chavara Kuriakose Elias ====
The next reforms in the Syro-Malabar rite were made by Kuriakose Elias Chavara, whom Bernardine Becchinelli appointed as Vicar General for the Malabar Chaldean Syrian Catholics. The first book of liturgical rubrics in the Syro-Malabaric Rite is the Tūqāsa published by Chavara in 1868, containing the rubrics of the Holy Qurbāna. It was fundamentally a text of the rubrics of the Latin Rite translated to Syriac. He translated the propers of the Holy Saturday from the Latin Rite into Syriac and published them. Chavara is also known to have dedicated each day of the week to a saint and special patronages for each month. Every Saturday as well as the entire month of May were dedicated to the Virgin Mary, with special prayers and rituals being held. He also translated Western books into Malayalam and published works such as Vaṇakkamāsam. Chavara's contributions include '40 hours adoration' and eucharistic adoration.

Along with the 40-hour adoration service, Latin practices such as the adoration of the Holy eucharistic host also spread among the Syro-Chaldeans of Malabar. In this regard, songs such as Sambāh Lēšan and Kollan Dašne were translated from the Latin rite into Syriac and promoted. (Note: Šambāh Lēšan is a Syriac translation of the first stanza of the Latin hymn, Pange Lingua) (Note: Kollan Dašne is the Syriac translation of the Latin hymn Tantum Ergo (the last two stanzas of Pange Lingua))

Although such reforms by Chavara Kuriakose Elias led to further Latinization, he also tried to preserve what that remained of the East Syriac Rite in Malabar. The Missal for the Chaldean Syrian Catholics of Malabar published by the Propaganda Fide in 1774, had avoided the traditional East Syriac liturgical calendar, thus creating much confusion among the Syro-Chaldean priests of Malabar in matters of variable prayers and the office of Liturgy of Hours. To solve this problem, Chavara took active interest in restoring the old East Syriac almanac and compiling the traditional breviary from fragmented sources. He made efforts to codify, publish, and popularize traditional East Syriac variable prayers. For this purpose, he printed and published the book Masmōṟa (Psalter) in 1871 at Koonammavu. As a result of long efforts, he also compiled a book of prayers for Sundays, feasts (Ēda), remembrance days (Duqṟāna) and ordinary days (Šehimma). But he died before it could be printed completely and published. In 1876, the order of the Šehimma (Kaškōl) was published by Leonardo Mellano, the Metropolitan of Verapoly. This was known as Āḻccappaṭi (weekly breviary). The first part of liturgy for the feast days compiled by Chavara was printed and published, but the Metropolitan forbade its use, accusing elements of Nestorian heresy. This book, known as the Perunnāḷpaṭi (festival breviary), however remained in use in some local monasteries.

=== Later Latinizations ===
Later Latinizations of the Syro-Malabar liturgy were led by Archbishop Leonardo Mellano and the local Syro-Malabar bishops appointed after 1896. They attempted to give official recognition to various devotional practices that had become popular during the time of the Carmelite missionaries. It was Mellano who gradually popularized the use of the tabernacle and special costumes for festivals and performances. The local bishops were interested in translating the liturgy of the Latin bishops (pontifical) into Syriac and using it. They were supported by Polish Cardinal Wladyslaw Zeleski, the papal delegate to India. His view is clear from his statement: "since it was a hybrid liturgy prevalent in Malabar for the past three centuries, it should be accepted as the true liturgy of the Malabar Church."

=== Restoration: Rome's ultimate decision ===
After the Syro-Malabar Church was granted independence from the local Latin church and a native hierarchy, Rome paid special attention in determining the exact liturgy of that church. The local Syro-Malabar bishops and the Latin priestly leadership wanted more Latinization in the way they practiced. However, Pope Pius XI, who studied the history of the Syro-Malabar Church in detail and sought the opinions of experts, took a completely different decision. In December 1934, the Pope declared that "Latinization should no longer be encouraged in the Syro-Malabaric Rite." He also appointed a committee to restore the original Syro-Malabaric liturgy in the form it existed prior to the changes enforced by Latin missionaries since the 16th century.

== Restoration ==
The deficiencies in the Syro-Malabar liturgy came to greater attention after the Pope separated the Syro-Malabar Church from the Latin Church in 1887 and granted them local bishops in 1896. While some of the bishops wanted to restore the original East Syriac Rite, others wanted to maintain the latinized Chaldean Rite and further add latin rite elements to correct the existing deficiencies. At the same time, another section of the clergy, called for the incorporation of North Indian Brahminical rituals and a new 'Indianized' liturgy. These furthered the disagreements between them.

=== Definitive decision of the Vatican ===
In 1934, Rome decided to restore the original East Syriac Rite in the Syro-Malabar Church, and appointed committee to direct the restoration of the Syro-Malabaric Qurbāna Taqsa. On June 26, 1957, Pope Pius XII restored and published the complete text of the Syro-Malabar Rāza Qurbāna Taqsa. A partial translation of this liturgy from Syriac into Malayalam was published on July 3, 1962, signed by all 7 bishops of the Syro-Malabar Church at that time, and was implemented throughout the Church.

=== Parecattil's innovations ===
In 1968, Joseph Parecattil, the then president of the Syro-Malabar Bishops' Conference, having been dissatisfied with the restored liturgy (Taqsa) published in 1962, published a new liturgical text by making further deletions and latinizations in it. At first, it was circulated in the Archdiocese of Ernakulam and then it started spreading to surrounding dioceses, under the influence of Parecattil. Following this, newer liturgical experiments based on Hindu Brahminical rites such as the Dharmaram 'Indian Mass', the National Biblical Catechetical and Liturgical Centre's (NBCLC) 'Bhāratīya Pūja', and the 'Ernakulam Mini Mass' of 1974 also became popular under the patronage of Parecattil. Parecattil himself officiated the inaugural usage of the 'Bhāratīya Pūja' at the consecration ceremony of the newly built Saint Mary's Cathedral in Ernakulam. The Latin and Syro-Malabar priests who supported these newer and innovative liturgical texts started ridiculing the supporters of the restored liturgy as 'Chaldean traditionalists' or 'Chaldeanists' (Kaldāyavādikaḷ). This led to severe dispute and conflict between dioceses within the Syro-Malabar Church.

=== Impact of the Second Vatican Council ===
The Second Vatican Council encouraged the recovery of lost Eastern Catholic liturgical traditions. On December 19, 1985, to resolve the confusion in the Syro-Malabaric liturgy, Rome directly published the revised 1962 Taqsa and strictly forbade the unauthorized liturgical forms prevalent in the Syro-Malabaric Rite. In addition to the complete solemn form or Rāza of the Syro-Malabar Qurbāna, the Taqsa also had shortened forms such as the 'solemn form' for Sundays and major feast days, and a simple form for ordinary days. On 8 February 1986, during his visit to India, Pope John Paul II personally inaugurated the restored Syro-Malabar liturgy in Kottayam.

At the same time, following the introduction of the versus populum mode in the Latin Rite, those who opposed the restored traditional Eastern liturgy began to practice it in the Syro-Malabar Church. Even after the unification of the liturgical text (Taqsa), differences in the direction of the celebrant, namely 'facing east' (ad orientum) and 'facing the people', continued regionally.

=== The unified liturgy ===
Following the elevation of the Syro-Malabar Church to the status of 'Major Archbishopric' in 1992, the church began discussions to resolve the differences and decided on a unified mode in 1999. However, this led to widespread protests among the local clergy. As a result, many diocesan bishops temporarily suspended its implementation. In 2020, church leadership resumed the process of unification of the liturgy and officially promulgated it in 2021. This is the first Syro-Malabar Taqsa that included the sacraments of Theodore and Nestorius, to be published after the Udayamperoor Synod, . The new Taqsa also included an instruction to celebrate the liturgy in a uniform mode throughout the church. Contrary to the traditional ad orientem mode, this new Taqsa asks the priest to face the people throughout the liturgy, except for the anaphora and its associated prayers. By 2022, this had been implemented in most dioceses in the Church. However, the defiance of local clergy in the Archdiocese of Ernakulam-Angamaly still remains as an obstacle to its complete implementation in the archdiocese.

== Holy Qurbana ==
The Syro-Malabaric Rite is the Indian variant of the Chaldean or East Syriac Rite. The eucharistic celebration in this rite is known as Holy Qurbāna (Syriac: ܩܘܪܒܢܐ ܩܕܝܫܐ; Qurbāna Qandīśa) . The complete form of the Holy Qurbāna is known as 'Rāza' (ܐܪܙܐ; Mystery) .

=== Forms ===
In addition to the most solemn and complete form of Holy Qurbāna, the Rāza, there are two other shortened forms in use: the solemn form and the simple form.

==== Raza ====
The most solemn and ritually rich form of the Holy Qurbāna is known as the 'Rāza'. Unlike the other two forms, it includes a more extensive set of rituals and songs. It includes the ceremonial kissing of the Holy Cross, extensive liturgy of the Word and Great prostration. The Rāza has two major parts: the 'liturgy of the Word' and the 'liturgy of the Eucharist'.

In all churches that follow the East Syriac Rite, the complete order of the Holy Qurbāna is known as the Rāza. At the same time, the Syro-Malabaric usage also has elements that are unique to it. A distinctive feature of the Syro-Malabaric Rāza is the 'Great prostration' at the beginning of the 'liturgy of the Eucharist'.

==== Solemn form ====
The solemn form is used on Sundays and major feast days. It excludes the peculiar components of the Raza such as the kissing of the Holy Cross, 'Onīsa da Qanke' (Antiphon of the sanctuary), 'Turgāme' (Interpretative hymns), 'Onīsa da Ewangēliōn' (Antiphon of the Gospel), blessing and dismissal of the catechumens, the great prostration and the first part of the 'Onīsa da Rāze'. In addition to these, the 'Śūrāya' (introductory hymn), one of the old testament readings, blessing of after the liturgy of the word, dyptichs, prayer requests, parts of the 'G'hānta' (inclination) prayers and the concluding 'Our Father' (Lord's prayer) are made optional.

==== Simple form ====
The simple form was created specifically for the weekdays (regular days except Sundays). Unlike the Rāza and the solemn form, it limits the readings from the Bible to just two (the Gospel and the Epistle only). Incensing is optional in the simple form.

=== Qudashe ===
There are three 'Qūdāśe' (singular: Qūdāśa) or anaphoras (eucharistic prayer) in the East Syriac rite. These are attributed to Addai-Mari, Theodore, and Nestorius. These 3 anaphoras are also known as the 'First Qūdāśa', the 'Second Qūdāśa', and the 'Third Qūdāśa', respectively. The canons of the Udayamperoor Synod vaguely indicate that in addition to these three Qudashe, another Qūdāśa named after Diodorus existed in Malabar in the 16th century. However, due to the lack of manuscripts, more information about this is not available.

==== Qudasha of Addai and Mari ====
Of the three existing eucharistic prayers, the Qūdāśa of Addai and Mari is the most popular and most extant. It is also known as the Qūdāśa of the Apostles. This is an abbreviation of the longer title, 'The Qūdāśa of Addai and Mari, the Apostles of the East'. It is named after Addai and Mari, who are traditionally believed to have spread Christianity in Edessa and Mesopotamia.

The absence of the institutional narrative (the account of Jesus Christ's Passover meal) in the Addai-Mari Anaphora, unlike the extant eucharistic prayers of other Christian rites, has raised doubts from various quarters about its sacramental validity. The Chaldean Catholic Church, formed in 1552, began to use the institutional narrative from that time onwards as part of the process of bringing their liturgy into line with the contemporary canons of the Catholic Church. It was first propagated in the Malabar Rite by Yawsep Sulaqa, who came to Malabar from this church as a metropolitan in 1558. This addition, which initially followed the Anaphora and the service of the breaking of the Holy Bread, was later subject to displacements at various times. Since 1986, the third G'hānta in the Syro-Malabar liturgy has been split into two and the institutional narrative has been added in between. The passage added as an introduction to this from Qūdāśa of Nestorius was used until the liturgical reform of 2021.

Meanwhile, the Catholic Church has never officially rejected the sacramental validity of the original form of the Qūdāśa of Addai and Mari. On July 20, 2001, the Catholic Church confirmed the Qūdāśa' of Addai and Mari to have sacramental validity, even without an institutional narrative. It was based on a study on the validity of the Qūdāśa conducted by a committee headed by prominent Catholic theologian and later pope Joseph Ratzinger.

==== Qudasha of Theodore ====
The Qūdāśa of Theodore is used from the season of the Annunciation until the Sunday of Ōśāna. The second anaphora is longer and more elaborate with prayers compared to the Addai-Mari anaphora. It has a clearer expression of the East Syrian Christology. It is often referred to as the 2nd Qūdāśa, instead of using Theodore's name. Theodore was considered by many religious scholars to be a Nestorian heretic. The Synod of Udayamperoor, held in 1599 under the leadership of Portuguese missionaries, prohibited the use of the anaphoras of Theodore and Nestorius and ordered the destruction of manuscripts. These two anaphoras were approved by Pope Pius XII on June 26, 1957, as part of the restoration of the Syro-Malabar liturgy, when he promulgated the restored Syro-Malabar 'Taqsa' (liturgical order). However, these were completely omitted from the Taqsa published by the Syro-Malabar bishops in Kerala in 1962 and subsequent years. It was only in 2013 that Theodore's Anaphora was restored for liturgical use in the Syro-Malabar Church.

==== Qudasha of Nestorius ====
The third Qūdāśa is traditionally used only on the feasts of Denha (Theophany), commemorations of John the Baptist and the Greek doctors (Diodore, Theodore and Nestorius), the last day of the Rogation of the Ninewites, and Maundy Thursday. This anaphora was the subject of much controversy because it was known under the name of Nestorius. This is also among the East Syriac works that were condemned and ordered to be burnt by the Udayamperoor Synod of 1599. Although this anaphora was restored in the Syro-Malabar Taqsa way back in 1957, it was implemented in the Syro-Malabar Church only in 2018.

=== Peculiar elements ===
==== Puqdankon ====
The public celebration of the Holy Qurbāna in the Syro-Malabaric Rite begins with the phrase Puqdānkōn (your mandate), unlike the Chaldean and Assyrian usages which instead begins the liturgy in the name of the Holy Trinity. The laity responds by chanting the phrase Puqdānē(h) damšīhā (the mandate of Christ). This is immediately followed by the angelic hymn 'Glory to God in the highest'.

==== Turgame ====
Turgāme (singular: Turgāma) are the Interpretative hymns for the Pauline epistles and Gospels in the Rāza. In the Syro-Malabaric Rite, an additional vocable, īnja, is added to each line of the hymn in order to complete rhythmic structure in the sung version. The Turgāma for the epistle is invariable. (Note: O d'ezdamman b'remzā rambā... (O you who are invited...)) There are a number of variable Turgāme for the Gospel which are extant. Some of these are for the following days:

1. Yalda (Nativity) (Note: O! Da m'haimnīn bhad Ālāha Āhid Kolla...)
2. Marth Mariam emmē d'Mśīha (Commemoration of Saint Mary, Mother of Christ) (Note: O! Da m'haimnīn Bāwā das rā Brihīdāya...)
3. Denha (Epiphany) (Note: O! Da m'haimnīn Bhād ba Roya Kayna Tmīha...)
4. Yohannān Māmdāna (John the Baptist) (Note: O! Da m'haimnīn bhād ba roya mariya dg ē...)
5. Pesaha (Maundy Thursday) (Note: O! Da m'haimnīn Baiy Tu ya ganyaza daw ra Brīta...)
6. Nuhra - Saturday of Light (Note: O! Da m'haimnīn Bhaw Tai būse ta Wāsangiya...)
7. Qyamta (Resurrection) (Note: O! Da m'haimnīn B Lemba Dakya u mau de yn b pūma...)
8. Pentecost (Note: O! Da m'haimnīn Beyth ya dav ra kol ma daqa wa...)
9. Saints Peter and Paul
10. Rogation of the Ninewites
11. Greek and Syriac Doctors
12. Annīde (Commemoration of the departed ones)
13. Sawma Ramba - Great Lent
14. Osāna
15. Commemoration of Saint Thomas
16. Duqrāna d Gīwargīs - Commemoration of Saint George
17. Sulāqa (Ascension)

==== Great prostration ====
A feature of the Syro-Malabaric Rāza is the part called 'eight-organ prostration' (Sāṣṭāmgapṟaṅāmam). Simultaneously, the hymn Kahna Ma D'a'el is sung as the first part of Onisa d'rāze (Antiphon of the Mysteries) by the ministers and the congregation. (Note: Among the East Syriac churches of the Middle East, Kahna ma d'a'el is alternatively used in the order of priestly ordination (syāmīda) and as the proper Onīsa d'rāze for the seventh Sunday of season of Shlihe.)

The prostration is performed after the Liturgy of the Word and the blessing and dismissal of the catechumens. The chief celebrant reaches the center of the naive and prostrates with eight organs (forehead, palms, knees, and feet) around a special rectangular carpet spread on the floor. This ritual is performed by bowing three times to each of the 4 sides of the carpet. Theologians interpret this as a distant preparation for the epiclesis of the Holy Qurbāna.

Historians consider this to be part of the worship at the 'Bēma'. (Note: The Bēma was part of the church architecture of the Church of the East until the 14th century. The Bēma is a raised platform located in the center of the church. The Bēma included the main pulpit, known as the Gāgulta, two smaller pulpits for Old and New Testament readings, the bishop's throne, and seats for other priests.) The construction of the Bēma was avoided in smaller churches due to space constraints and other inconveniences. The same was true of the churches in Malabar, which were relatively small due to the limitations of the local architectural style. However, scholars consider the prostration as evidence that the rituals that were supposed to be performed in the Bēma were performed without interruption in the churches of Malabar, even in the absence of the Bēma.

The servers after preparing the bread and wine for the Holy Qurbāna leads the celebrant standing at the Bēma, after the liturgy of the Word and the blessing and dismissal of the catechumens, for the litugy of the sacrament in the Madbaha. This is a ritual prayer performed for the descent of the Holy Spirit, in which the celebrant goes to all 4 sides of the Bēma and bows down three times each. In the Syro-Malabaric liturgy, a rectangular cloth sewn with a Saint Thomas Cross is spread on the floor in the center of the church in the place of the Bēma.

== The Hours ==
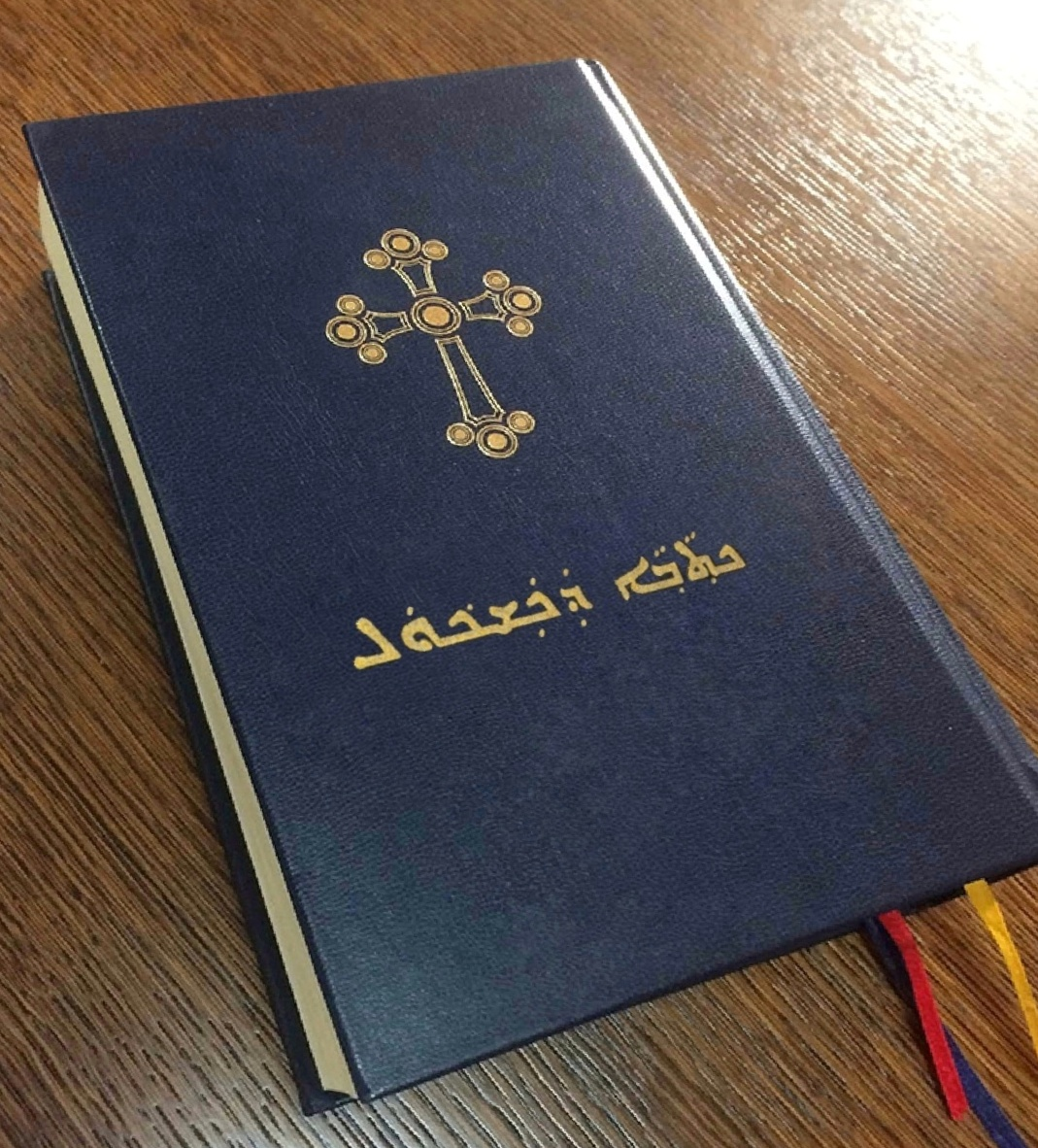
Kaśkōl: A book of prayers for ordinary days in the East Syriac Rite

According to Syriac tradition, a day is considered from sunset to sunset. Liturgy of the hours are chanted at 7 or 8 times a day:

1. Ramśa (ܪܲܡܫܵܐ; 'Vespers or 1st watch')
2. Suba'a (ܣܘܼܒܵܥܵܐ; ' Compline or 2nd watch')
3. Lelia (ܠܸܠܝܵܐ 'Nocturns or 3rd watch')
4. Qala da Śahra (ܩܵܠܵܐ ܕܫܲܗܪܵ; 'Vigil or 4th watch')
5. Sapra (ܨܲܦܪܵܐ; 'Prime or 1st hour')
6. Quta'a (ܩܘܼܛܵܥܵܐ; 'Terce or 3rd hour')
7. Endana (ܥܸܕܵܢܵܐ; 'Sexts or 6th hour')
8. D' bas'śa Śāyīn (ܕܒܬܫܐ ܫܐܝܢ; 'Nons or 9th hour')

The core of these canonical offices is the psalms. Prayers and hymns are used in conjunction with this. The order of the Hours is arranged into four sets of prayers:

- Śehimma (ordinary or ferial days),
- Māranāya ('Feasts of Our Lord'),
- Ēda (other feasts) and
- Duqrāne (commemorations of saints)

These are traditionally compiled into different texts such as:

1. Hudra (the circle) : it covers the entirety of the proper prayers and hymns for the whole liturgical year, including all Sundays and the feasts without fixed dates
2. Kaśkōl (begging bowl) : covers the ordinary prayers for the weekdays
3. Gazza (treasure) : comprises the propers for the feasts with fixed dates

=== Ramśa ===
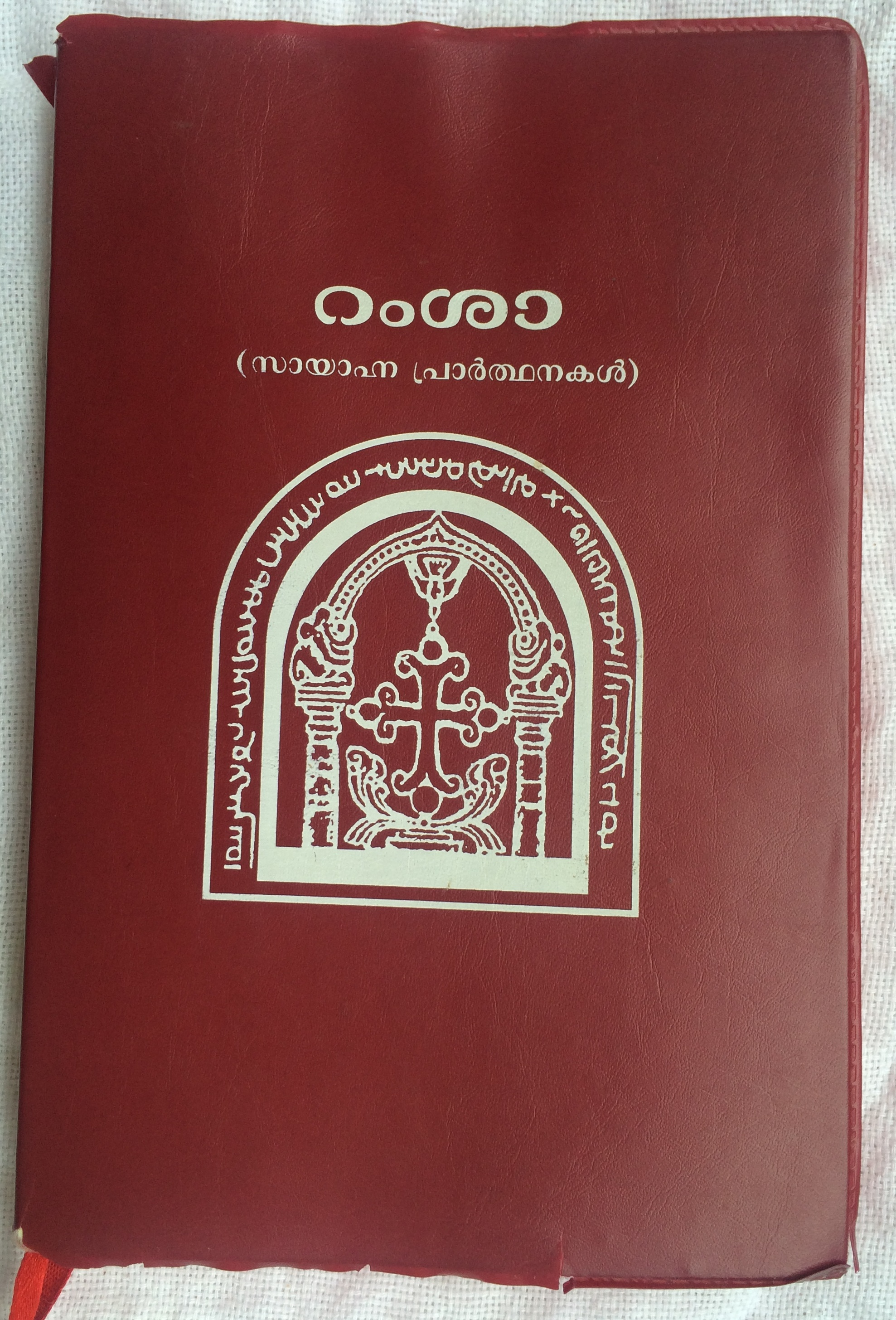
Ramśa breviary

Ramśa, literally 'the evening', is the evening liturgy in the East Syriac tradition. It is the first prayer of the liturgical day and is the also the most important congregational prayer among the hours. This prayer is performed for the first watch of the day, that is from 6 to 9 o'clock afternoon.

Most distinctive of the elements of the Ramśa are the Antiphons of 'before' and 'after', which ordinarily repeat every two week, and the proper gospel reading of the day. The Antiphon of Ramśa is specific to each day. While the Antiphon of 'before' (Onīsa d'qdam) and the Antiphon of 'after' (Onīsa d'wāsar) are sung from the 'Book of Before and After' (Ksāwa d'Qdam od'wāsar) on ferial days and the Hudra on sundays and feast days, the proper Antiphon of Ramśa is always to be selected from the Hudra. The latter is also called the 'royal antiphon' (Onīsa d'wāsāliqe) on feast days.

== Calendar ==
The liturgical year in the Syro-Malabaric Rite is divided into 8 seasons. This is the liturgical calendar compiled by Ishoyahb III, Catholicos-Patriarch of the Church of the East, and used in the East Syriac Rite:

1. Annunciation (Sūwāra)
2. Denha
3. Sawma Ramba (Great Fast)
4. Resurrection (Qyamta)
5. Slihe
6. Qayta (Hallelayn)
7. Eliah-Sliwa-Muse
8. Qudas Edta (Pallikkūdāsa)

== Language and music ==
=== Language ===
Syriac has several peculiar phonetic features in the Syro-Malabaric Rite. Some of these are retained to a certain extent, albeit unofficially, in the Malankara Rite as well. Some of these evolved under the influence of the indigenous language usage of Malabar, while others are more ancient forms of the Syriac language itself, which survived in this isolated Christian community of Malabar.

Syro-Malabaric pronunciation adds a nasal sound instead of the characteristic doubling of letters common in the Middle Eastern form of East Syriac pronunciation. For example: ܩܲܕܝܼܫܵܐ is pronounced qandīśa instead of qaddīśa (other examples include ܪܲܒܵܐ as ramba, ܚܘܼܒܵܐ as humba and ܠ̤ܒܵܐ as lemba). This is indeed the more archaic way of Aramaic pronunciation, where all doubled letters receive a nasal sound. Rūkāqa (soft aspirate) of the letter Tāw (ܬ݂) is pronounced in Malabaric version as "s". For example: ܡܲܠܟ݁ܘܼܬ݂ܵܐ is pronounced Malkūsa. This practice is prevalent in the East Syriac pronunciation in Persia and Malabar. Meanwhile, ܗ (Hē) is often occulted in Syro-Malabaric pronunciation unlike the usage in Persia and Mesopotamia.

Due to the influence of the indigenous Dravidian language usage, Zayn (ܙ), Semakaṯ (ܣ) and Sādē (ܨ) are usually not distinguishable in pronunciation. The same holds true regarding Hē (ܗ) and Ḥēṯ (ܚ) as well as Ālap (ܐ) and Ayn (ܥ).

Syro-Malabaric pronunciation does not stick fast to the Middle Eastern practice of pronouncing vowels short when they stand at the beginning of a closed syllable. Meanwhile Pthaha and Zlāma pśiqa are not prolonged unlike the Middle Eastern varieties where all the vowels are pronounced long when they are on the penultimate or in monosyllabic words followed by a single non-vocalised consonant.

=== Music ===
Syro-Malabaric liturgical music is one of the branches of classical music in India. It is the oldest of the different Christian musical schools in the subcontinent. According to musicologist and scholar Joseph Palackal, Syro-Malabaric music has four distinctive genres. These are:

1. Traditional East Syriac music inherited from Middle Eastern source;
2. Music of Indian origin influenced by East Syriac and local music;
3. Post-17th century music for pre-existing East Syriac liturgical texts;
4. Latin liturgical music associated with Syriac translations of Latin hymns.

The melodies used for the chants of the Liturgy of the Hours and Office for the Dead comprise the category of traditional East Syriac liturgical music. These survived in the Syro-Malabaric Rite, despite their gradual disappearance in the Middle East, their original land. There are about 23 extant melodies in this category retained in the Malayalam translation of the Liturgy of the Hours.

The second category includes the distinctively local melodies of the chants composed by local writers such as Kadavil Chandy. Only a handful of melodies are extant in this category. The third category constitutes the distinctively latin melodies of Syriac translations of Latin liturgical chants such as the Pange Lingua and Kyrie Eleison. (Note: Quryēlaisōn is the opening verse of the Syriac translation of the Litany to Saint Mary.)

The fourth category comprises most of the melodies of the Syro-Malabaric Rāza. These exhibit a considerable influence of the Latin chant melodies such as that of the Latin chant Exultet.
