= Liturgical year =

Annually recurring fixed sequence of Christian feast days

The liturgical year, also called the church year, Christian year, ecclesiastical calendar, or kalendar, consists of the cycle of liturgical days and seasons that determines when feast days, including celebrations of saints, are to be observed, and which portions of scripture are to be read.

Distinct liturgical colours may be used in connection with different seasons of the liturgical year. The dates of the festivals vary somewhat among the different churches, although the sequence and logic is largely the same.

== Liturgical cycle ==
The liturgical year of some Western churches, indicating the liturgical colours

The liturgical cycle divides the year into a series of seasons, each with their own mood, theological emphases, and modes of prayer, which can be signified by different ways of decorating churches, colours of paraments and vestments for clergy, scriptural readings, themes for preaching and even different traditions and practices often observed personally or in the home. In churches that follow the liturgical year, the scripture passages for each Sunday (and even each day of the year in some traditions) are specified in a lectionary.

After the Protestant Reformation, Anglicans and Lutherans continued to follow the lectionary of the Roman Rite. Following a decision of the Second Vatican Council, the Catholic Church revised that lectionary in 1969, adopting a three-year cycle of readings for Sundays and a two-year cycle for weekdays.

Adaptations of the revised Roman Rite lectionary were adopted by Protestants, leading to the publication in 1994 of the Revised Common Lectionary for Sundays and major feasts, which is now used by many Protestant denominations, including also Methodists, United, some Reformed, etc. This has led to a greater awareness of the traditional Christian year among Protestants, especially among mainline denominations.

== Biblical calendars ==
Scholars are not in agreement about whether the calendars used by the Jews before the Babylonian exile were solar (based on the return of the same relative position between the Sun and the Earth), lunisolar (based on months that corresponded to the cycle of the moon, with periodic additional months to bring the calendar back into agreement with the solar cycle) like the present-day Jewish calendar of Hillel II, or lunar, such as the Hijri calendar.

The first month of the Hebrew year was called אביב (Aviv), meaning the month of green ears of grain. Having to occur at the appropriate time in the spring, it thus was originally part of a tropical calendar. At about the time of the Babylonian exile, when using the Babylonian civil calendar, the Jews adopted the term ניסן (Nisan) as the name for the month, based on the Babylonian name Nisanu. Thomas J Talley says that the adoption of the Babylonian term occurred even before the exile.

In the earlier calendar, most of the months were simply called by a number (such as "the fifth month"). The Babylonian-derived names of the month that are used by Jews are:

1. Nisan (March–April)
2. Iyar (April–May)
3. Sivan (May–June)
4. Tammuz (June–July)
5. Av (July–August)
6. Elul (August–September)
7. Tishrei (September–October)
8. Marcheshvan (October–November)
9. Kislev (November–December)
10. Tevet (December–January)
11. Shevat (January–February)
12. Adar 1 (February; only during leap years)
13. Adar (February–March)

In Biblical times, the following Jewish religious feasts were celebrated:

- Pesach (Passover) – 14 Nisan (sacrifice of a lamb), 15 Nisan (Passover seder)
- Chag HaMatzot (Unleavened Bread) – 15–21 Nisan
- Reishit Katzir (Firstfruits) – 16 Nisan
- Shavuot (Weeks) – Fiftieth day counted from Passover, normally 6–7 Sivan
- Rosh Hashanah (Trumpets) – 1–2 Tishrei
- Yom Kippur (Atonement) – 10 Tishrei
- Sukkot (Tabernacles) – 15–21 Tishrei
- Chanukah (Dedication) – 25 Kislev–2/3 Tevet (instituted in 164 BC)
- Purim (Lots) – 14–15 Adar (instituted in c. 400 BC)

== Eastern Christianity ==
=== East Syriac Rite ===
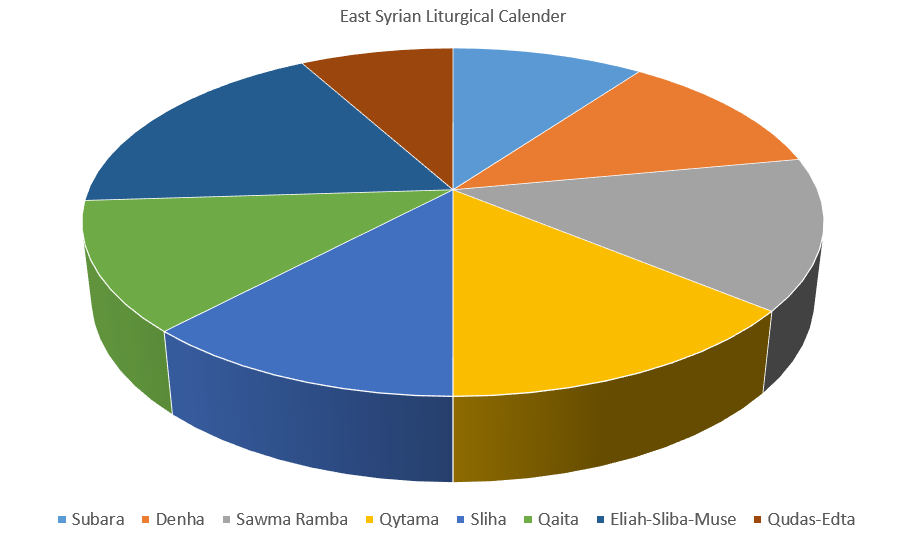
The liturgical seasons of East Syriac Catholic churches

The Liturgical Calendar of the East Syriac Rite is fixed according to the flow of salvation history. With a focus upon the historical life of Jesus Christ, believers are led to the eschatological fulfillment (i.e. the heavenly bliss) through this special arrangement of liturgical seasons. The liturgical year is divided into 8 seasons of approximately 7 weeks each but adjusted to fit the solar calendar. The arrangement of the Seasons in the Liturgical Year is based on seven central events on celebrations of the Salvation History. They are:

1. Nativity of Christ
2. Epiphany of Christ
3. Resurrection of Christ
4. Pentecost
5. Transfiguration
6. Glorious Cross
7. Parousia (the Dedication of Church after Christ's second coming)

One of the oldest available records mentioning the liturgical cycle of east-syriac rite is handwritten manuscript named 'Preface to Hudra' written by Rabban Brick-Iso in 14th century. The manuscript mentions that the liturgical year is divided into nine seasons starting from Subara and ends with Qudas Edta. Catholic churches of east-syriac rite maintains the same liturgical calendar until the current date except that many consider 7th and 8th seasons as a single one. The biblical reading and prayers during Mass and Liturgy of the Hours vary according to different seasons in the liturgical calendar.

==== Liturgical Calendar ====
The various seasons of the liturgical calendar of Syro-Malabar Church and Chaldean Catholic Church are given below.

===== Annunciation (Subara) =====
Weeks of Annunciation (Subara) is the first season of the liturgical year. The liturgical year begins with the commemoration of biblical events leading to the annunciation and birth of Jesus as expected savior in the old testament. The season begins on the Sunday just before the first of December and ends with the feast of Epiphany that is the Feast of the Baptism of Jesus. The faithful practice abstinence during December 1–25 in preparation for Christmas; this period is called "25 days Lent".

Feasts celebrated during this season

- Feast of the Immaculate Conception of Mary, mother of Jesus (December 8)
- Feast of Miraculous Cross of Mylapore (Saint Thomas Christian cross) (December 18) in Syro Malabar Church
- Nativity of Our Lord and Saviour Jesus Christ or Christmas (December 25)
- Feast of Holy Infants (December 28)
- Feast of Name Iso (January 1)
- Feast of Mary, mother of Jesus (last Friday of Season)

===== Epiphany (Denha) =====
Weeks of Epiphany begins on the Sunday closest to the feast of Epiphany and runs to the beginning of Great Fast. The word denha in Syriac means sunrise. Church considers the baptism of Jesus in the River Jordan as the first historical event in which the Trinity was revealed to humankind in the person of Jesus Christ. Thus the season commemorates the manifestation or revelation of Jesus and Trinity to the world. During the season the church celebrates the feasts of Saints in connection with the manifestation of the Lord.

Feasts celebrated during the period

- Feast of Epiphany or Feast of Baptism of the Lord (January 6)
- Feast of Saint John the Baptist on first Friday of Epiphany
- Feast of Apostles Peter (Kepha) and Paul on second Friday of Epiphany
- Feast of Evangelists on third Friday of Epiphany
- Feast of Saint Stephan on fourth Friday of Epiphany
- Feast of Fathers of Church on fifth Friday of Epiphany
- Feast of Patron Saint of Church on sixth Friday of Epiphany
- Feast of all departed faithful on last Friday of Epiphany

===== Great Fast (Sawma Rabba) =====
During these weeks the faithful meditate over the 40-day fast of Jesus and the culmination of his public life in passion, death and burial. The season begins 50 days before Easter on Peturta Sunday and comprises the whole period of Great Lent and culminates on Resurrection Sunday. Word Peturta in Syriac means "looking back" or "reconciliation". Faithful enter the weeks of Great Fast, celebrating the memory of all the Faithful Departed on the last Friday of Denha.

According to the ecclesial tradition, the weeks of Great Fast is also an occasion to keep up the memory of the beloved Departed through special prayers, renunciation, almsgiving, and so on and thus prepare oneself for a good death and resurrection in Jesus Christ. During the fast faithful of Syro Malabar Church do not use meat, fish, egg, many dairy products, and most favorite food items, and avoid sexual contacts on all days including Sundays and Feast days. Before European colonization, Indian Nasranis used to have food only once a day (after 3:00 pm) on all days during Great Fast. - Feasts in the Lenten Season

- Peturta Sunday on First Sunday of Great Fast
- Ash Monday or Clean Monday on the first day (Monday) of Great Fast
- Lazarus Friday on the sixth Friday of Great Fast
- Oshana Sunday on the seventh Sunday of Great Fast
- Thursday of Pesha
- Friday of Passion or Good Friday
- Great Saturday or Saturday of Light

The following feasts are always in the Lenten Season:

- Feast of Mar Cyril of Jerusalem (March 18)
- Feast of Saint Joseph (March 19)
- Feast of the Annunciation (March 25)

===== Resurrection (Qyamta) =====
The weeks of Great Resurrection begin on the Resurrection Sunday and run to the feast of Pentecost. The Church celebrates the Resurrection of our Lord during these seven weeks: Jesus' victory over death, sin, suffering and Satan. The church also commemorates various events that occurred after the resurrection of Christ, such as the visits of Jesus to the Apostles and the ascension of Jesus.

According to eastern Christianity, the Feast of Resurrection is the most important and the greatest feast in a liturgical year. Therefore, the season commemorating the resurrection of Christ is also of prime importance in the church liturgy. The first week of the season is celebrated as the 'Week of weeks' as it is the week of the resurrection of Christ.

Feasts celebrated during the period:

- Feast of Resurrection of Christ
- Feast of All Confessors (Saints) on the first Friday of Qyamta
- New Sunday or St. Thomas Sunday on the second Sunday of Qyamta
- Feast of Ascension of Jesus on the sixth Friday of Qyamta

The following feasts are always in the season of resurrection:

- Feast of Saint George (April 24)
- Feast of Mark the Evangelist (April 25)
- Feast of Saint Joseph, the worker (May 1)
- Feasts of Saint Philip and Saint James the apostles (May 3)

===== Apostles (Slihe) =====
Weeks of apostles (Slihe) starts on the feast of Pentecost, fiftieth day of the Resurrection Sunday. During these days the church commemorates the inauguration of church and the acts of apostles and church fathers through which the foundation of the church was laid. Church meditates on the virtues of the early church: fellowship, breaking of bread and sharing of wealth, and the fruits and gifts of Holy Spirit. The spread of the church all over the world as well as her growth is also remembered during this season.

Feast celebrated during the season:

- Feast of Pentecost on first Sunday of Slihe
- Feast of Friday of Gold: The first commemoration of the first miracle of apostles done by Saint Peter.

The following feasts are commemorated in the season of Slihe

- Feast of Mar Aphrem (June 10)
- Feast of the Apostles Peter and Paul (June 29)
- Feast of Mar Thoma, founding father of east Syriac churches (July 3)
- Feast of Mar Quriaqos and Yolitha (July 15)

===== Qaita (Summer) =====
Along the weeks of Qaita maturity and fruitfulness of church are commemorated. The Syriac word Qaita means "summer" and it is a time of harvest for the Church. The fruits of the Church are those of holiness and martyrdom. While the sprouting and infancy of the Church were celebrated in 'the Weeks of the Apostles,' her development in different parts of the world by reflecting the image of the heavenly Kingdom and giving birth to many saints and martyrs are proclaimed during this season. Fridays of this Season are set apart for honoring saints and martyrs.

Feast celebrated during the season:

- Feast of the twelve apostles and Nusardeil on the first Sunday of Qaita (Nusardeil is a Persian word which means "God-given New Year Day").
- Feast of Mar Jacob of Nisibis on the first Friday of Qaita.
- Feast of Mar Mari on the second Friday of Qaita.
- Feast of Marta Simoni and her Seven Children on the fifth Friday of Qaita.
- Feast of Mar Shimun Bar Sabbai and Companions on the sixth Friday of Qaita.
- Feast of martyr Mar Quardag on the seventh Friday of Qaita.

The following feasts are commemorated in the season of Qaita

- Feast of seventy disciples of Jesus (July 27)
- Feast of Saint Alphonsa in Syro Malabar Catholic Church (July 28)
- Feast of Transfiguration of Jesus (August 6)
- Feast of Assumption of Mary (August 15)

===== Eliyah-Sliba-Moses =====
The name of the seasons of Eliyah-Sliba-Moses takes their origin from the feast of the transfiguration of Jesus. And the seasons revolve around the exaltation of the cross on the feast of the glorious cross on September 14. During the seasons of Eliyah and Sliba church reminds the faithful of the heavenly bliss which is promised to be inherited at the end of earthly life and the church commemorates the exaltic experience of the bliss through various sacraments. While during the season of Moses church meditates upon the end of time and the last judgment. Many at times the season of Moses is regarded as a distinct and separate season from the other two since it has a distinct theme.

The season of Eliyah has a length of one to three Sundays. Season of Sliba starts on Sunday on or after the feast of the glorious cross and has a length of three to four weeks. The first Sunday of Sliba is always considered as the fourth Sunday of the combined season. The season of Moses always has four weeks.

Feast celebrated during the seasons:

- Feast of the glorious Cross

The following feasts are commemorated in the seasons of Eliyah-Sliba-Moses

- Feast of Nativity of Mary on September 8 and the eight-day fast in preparation for the feast

===== Dedication of the church (Qudas Edta) =====
The weeks of the dedication of the church is the last liturgical season in the East Syriac rite. It consists of four weeks and ends on the Saturday before Sunday between November 27 and December 3. The theme of the season is that the church is presented by Christ as his eternal bride before his father at the heavenly bride chamber. The period has its origin in the feast of the dedication of the church of Sephelcure or the Jewish feast of Hanukkah. However, the season was officially instituted by Patriarch Isho-Yahb III of Seleucia-Ctesiphon (647–657) by separating it from the season of Moses.

Feasts celebrated during the season:

- Feast of dedication of the church on 1st Sunday of Qudas Edta
- Feast of Christ the King on last Sunday of Qudas Edta (Celebrated only in eastern catholic churches of the rite since pope Pius XI instituted it in Roman-rite).

=== Eastern Orthodox Church ===
The liturgical year in the Eastern Orthodox Church is characterized by alternating fasts and feasts, and is in many ways similar to the Catholic year. However, Church New Year (Indiction) traditionally begins on September 1 (Old Style or New Style), rather than the first Sunday of Advent. It includes both feasts on the Fixed Cycle and the Paschal Cycle (or Moveable Cycle). The most important feast day by far is the Feast of Pascha (Easter) – the Feast of Feasts. Then the Twelve Great Feasts, which commemorate various significant events in the lives of Jesus Christ and of the Theotokos (Virgin Mary).

The majority of Orthodox Christians (Russians, in particular) follow the Julian Calendar in calculating their ecclesiastical feasts, but many (including the Ecumenical Patriarchate and the Church of Greece), while preserving the Julian calculation for feasts on the Paschal Cycle, have adopted the Revised Julian Calendar (at present coinciding with the Gregorian Calendar) to calculate those feasts which are fixed according to the calendar date.

Between 1900 and 2100, there is a thirteen-day difference between the dates of the Julian and the Revised Julian and Gregorian calendars. Thus, for example, where Christmas is celebrated on December 25 O.S. (Old Style), the celebration coincides with January 7 in the Revised Calendar. The computation of the day of Pascha (Easter) is, however, always computed according to a lunar calendar based on the Julian Calendar, even by those churches which observe the Revised Calendar.

There are four fasting seasons during the year: The most important fast is Great Lent which is an intense time of fasting, almsgiving and prayer, extending for forty days prior to Palm Sunday and Holy Week, as a preparation for Pascha. The Nativity Fast (Winter Lent) is a time of preparation for the Feast of the Nativity of Christ (Christmas), but whereas Advent in the West lasts only four weeks, Nativity Fast lasts a full forty days. The Apostles' Fast is variable in length, lasting anywhere from eight days to six weeks, in preparation for the Feast of Saints Peter and Paul (June 29). The Dormition Fast lasts for two weeks from August 1 to August 14 in preparation for the Feast of the Dormition of the Theotokos (August 15). The liturgical year is so constructed that during each of these fasting seasons, one of the Great Feasts occurs, so that fasting may be tempered with joy.

In addition to these fasting seasons, Orthodox Christians fast on Wednesdays and Fridays throughout the year (and some Orthodox monasteries also observe Monday as a fast day). Certain fixed days are always fast days, even if they fall on a Saturday or Sunday (in which case the fast is lessened somewhat, but not abrogated altogether); these are: The Decollation of St. John the Baptist, the Exaltation of the Cross and the day before the Epiphany (January 5). There are several fast-free periods, when it is forbidden to fast, even on Wednesday and Friday. These are: the week following Pascha, the week following Pentecost, the period from the Nativity of Christ until January the 5th and the first week of the Triodion (the week following the 17th Sunday before Pentecost).

==== Pascha ====
The greatest feast is Pascha. Easter for both East and West is calculated as the first Sunday after the full moon that falls on or after March 21 (nominally the day of the vernal equinox), but the Orthodox calculations are based on the Julian calendar, whose March 21 corresponds at present with April 3 of the Gregorian calendar, and on calculations of the date of full moon different from those used in the West (see computus for further details).

The date of Pascha is central to the entire ecclesiastical year, determining not only the date for the beginning of Great Lent and Pentecost, but affecting the cycle of moveable feasts, of scriptural readings and the Octoechos (texts chanted according to the eight ecclesiastical modes) throughout the year. There are also a number of lesser feasts throughout the year that are based upon the date of Pascha. The moveable cycle begins on the Zacchaeus Sunday (the first Sunday in preparation for Great Lent or the 33rd Sunday after Pentecost as it is known), though the cycle of the Octoechos continues until Palm Sunday.

The date of Pascha affects the following liturgical seasons:

- The period of the Triodion (the Sundays before Great Lent, Cheesefare Week, Palm Sunday, and Holy Week)
- The period of the Pentecostarion (Sunday of Pascha through the Sunday After Pentecost which is also called the Sunday of all saints)

==== The twelve Great Feasts ====
Some of these feasts follow the Fixed Cycle, and some follow the Moveable (Paschal) Cycle. Most of those on the Fixed Cycle have a period of preparation called a Forefeast, and a period of celebration afterward, similar to the Western Octave, called an Afterfeast. Great Feasts on the Paschal Cycle do not have Forefeasts. The lengths of Forefeasts and Afterfeasts vary, according to the feast.

- Nativity of the Theotokos (September 8): the birth of the Theotokos to Joachim and Anna
- Elevation of the Cross (September 14): the rediscovery of the original Cross on which Christ was crucified
- Entrance of the Theotokos into the Temple (November 21): the entry of the Theotokos into the Temple around the age of 3
- Nativity of Our Lord and Saviour Jesus Christ (December 25): the birth of Jesus, or Christmas
- Theophany (January 6): the baptism of Jesus Christ, Christ's blessing of the water and the revealing of Christ as God
- Presentation of Our Lord in the Temple (February 2): the presentation of Christ as an infant in the Temple by the Theotokos and Joseph
- Annunciation of the Theotokos (March 25): the announcement by Gabriel to the Theotokos that she will conceive the Christ, and her wilful agreement thereto. In Eastern practice, should this feast fall during Holy Week or on Pascha itself, the feast of the Annunciation is not transferred to another day. In fact, the conjunction of the feasts of the Annunciation and Pascha (dipli Paschalia, Greek: διπλή Πασχαλιά) is considered an extremely festive event.
- Entry into Jerusalem (Sunday before Pascha): known in the West as Palm Sunday
- Ascension (40 days after Pascha): Christ's ascension into Heaven following his resurrection
- Pentecost (50 days after Pascha): the coming and indwelling of the Holy Spirit to the apostles and other Christian believers
- Transfiguration of Our Lord (August 6): Christ's Transfiguration as witnessed by Peter, James, and John
- Dormition of the Theotokos (August 15): the falling asleep of the Theotokos (cf. the Assumption of Mary in Western Christianity)

==== Other feasts ====
Some additional feasts are observed as though they were Great Feasts:

- Protection of the Mother of God (October 1), especially among the Russian Orthodox
- Feast of Saint James the Just (October 23)
- Feast of Saint Demetrius of Thessaloniki (October 26)
- Feast of the Holy Archangels Michael and Gabriel (November 8)
- Feast of Saint Nicholas, the Bishop of Myra in Lycia (December 6)
- Feast of the Conception of Mary by Saints Joachim and Anne (December 9)
- Feast of Saint Spiridon (December 12)
- Feast of Saint Stephen the Deacon (December 27)
- Feast of Saint Basil the Great and the Circumcision of Christ (January 1)
- Feast of the Three Holy Hierarchs: Basil the Great, Gregory the Theologian and John Chrysostom (January 30)
- Feast of the Forty Martyrs of Sebaste (March 9)
- Feast of Saint Patrick (March 17)
- Feast of Saint George (April 23)
- Feast of the Holy Emperors Constantine and Helen (May 21)
- Nativity of Saint John the Baptist (June 24)
- Feast of Saints Peter and Paul (June 29)
- Feast of Saint Elijah the Prophet (July 20)
- Feast of Saint Christina of Bolsena the Great Martyr (July 24)
- Beheading of St. John the Baptist (August 29)
- Beginning of the Indiction-Ecclesiastical Year (September 1)
- Patronal Feast of a church or monastery

Every day throughout the year commemorates some saint or some event in the lives of Christ or the Theotokos. When a feast on the moveable cycle occurs, the feast on the fixed cycle that was set for that calendar day is transferred, with the propers of the feast often being chanted at Compline on the nearest convenient day.

==== Cycles ====
In addition to the Fixed and Moveable Cycles, there are a number of other liturgical cycles in the ecclesiastical year that affect the celebration of the divine services. These include, the Daily Cycle, the Weekly Cycle, the Cycle of Matins Gospels, and the Octoechos.

== Western Christianity ==
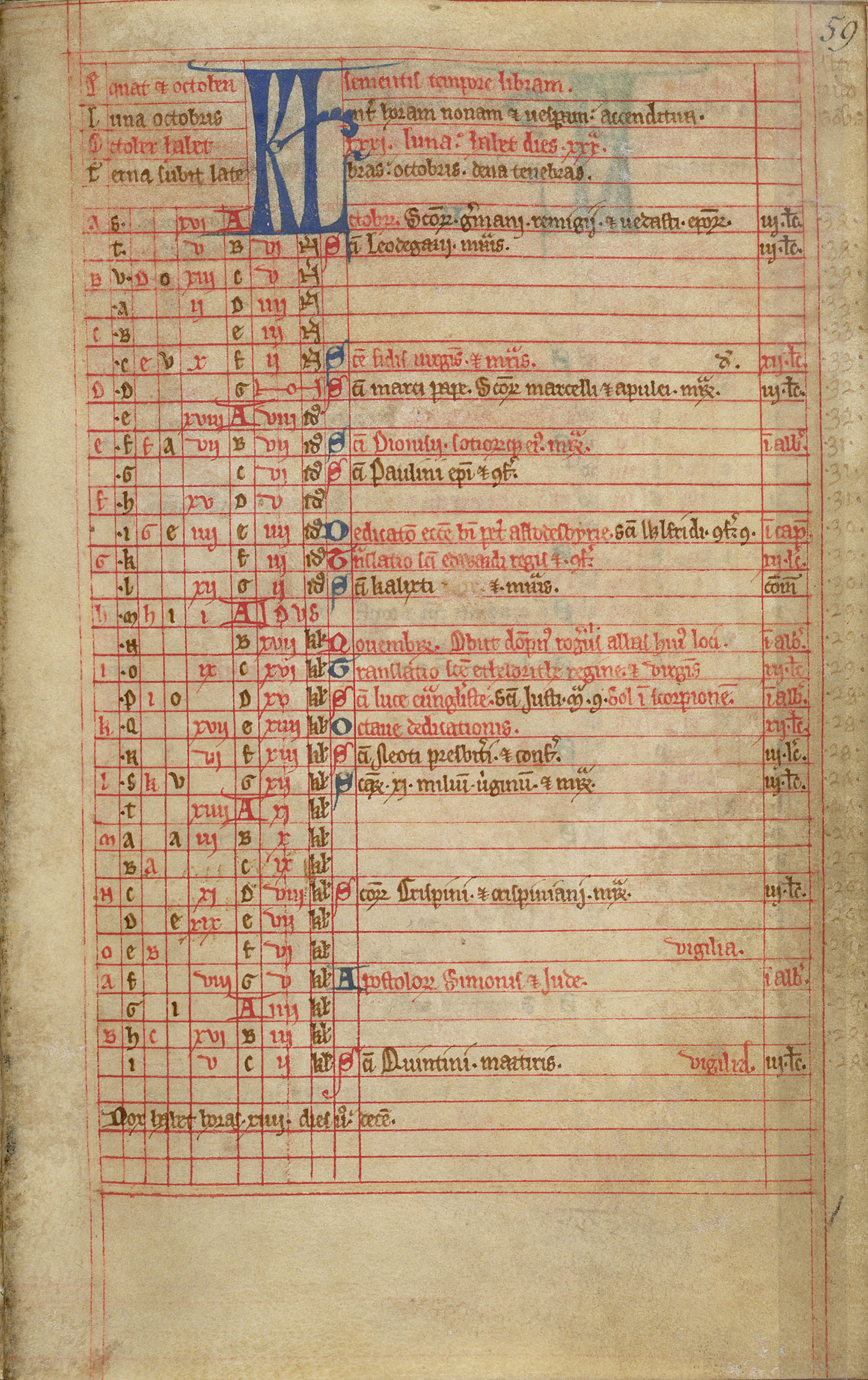
The month of October from a liturgical calendar for Abbotsbury Abbey. 13th-century manuscript (British Library, Cotton MS Cleopatra B IX, folio 59r).

Western Christian liturgical calendars are based on the cycle of the Roman Rite of the Catholic Church, and are also followed in many Protestant churches, including the Lutheran, Anglican, and other traditions. Generally, the seasons in liturgical western Christianity are Advent, Christmas, Ordinary Time (Time after Epiphany), Lent, Easter, and Ordinary Time (Time after Pentecost). Some Protestant traditions do not include Ordinary Time: every day falls into a denominated season. Other Protestant churches, such as a minority in the Reformed tradition, reject the liturgical year entirely on the grounds that its observance is not directed in scripture.

For those that follow the Western liturgical year, the Revised Common Lectionary provides scriptural structure for the patterns of the seasons. Protestant denominations that follow this lectionary include Methodists, Anglicans/Episcopalians, Lutherans, Presbyterians, some Baptists and Anabaptists, among others. With regard to the calendars of the Western Christian Churches that use the Revised Common Lectionary, Vanderbilt University Professor Hoyt L. Hickman, states that:

All these calendars agree that the Lord's Day is of primary importance among the observances of the year and that the Christian Year contains two central cycles – the Easter cycle and the Christmas cycle. Each cycle includes a festival season (Easter and Christmas), preceded by a season of preparation and anticipation (Lent and Advent). In most denominational versions and in the Common Lectionary, Lent and Advent are immediately preceded by a transitional Sunday (Transfiguration and Christ the King), and the Easter and Christmas Seasons are immediately followed by a transitional Sunday (Trinity and Baptism of the Lord).

Protestant Churches, with exception of the Lutheran and Anglican, generally observe fewer if any feasts with regard to the saints than the aforementioned liturgical denominations, in addition to the Catholic and Orthodox Churches.

=== Denominational specifics ===
==== Catholic Church ====
In summary, the Catholic Church "unfolds within the cycle of a year ... the whole mystery of Christ, from the incarnation and birth until the ascension, the day of Pentecost, and the expectation of blessed hope and of the coming of the Lord. Recalling thus the mysteries of redemption, the Church opens to the faithful the riches of her Lord's powers and merits, so that these are in some way made present for all time, and the faithful are enabled to lay hold upon them and become filled with saving grace." Within this cycle, the resurrection of Jesus is celebrated both weekly, on Sundays, and annually, at Easter, "together with His blessed passion". A number of changes to the Catholic Church's liturgical year were put in place by the Second Vatican Council.

Various other events in the life of Christ and his saints are also recalled and celebrated on specific days or seasons of each year.

1. In its Roman Rite the liturgical year begins with Advent, the time of preparation for both the nativity of Christ, and his expected second coming at the end of time. The Advent season lasts until the first vespers of Christmas Eve on December 24.
2. Christmastide follows, beginning with First Vespers of Christmas on the evening of December 24 and ending with the Feast of the Baptism of the Lord, on the first Sunday after Epiphany (the latter is on January 6 generally).
3. A period of ordinary time includes the days between Christmastide and the start of Lent.
4. Lent is the period of purification and penance that begins on Ash Wednesday and ends on Holy Thursday.
5. The Mass of the Lord's Supper on the evening of Holy Thursday marks the beginning of the Easter Triduum, which includes Good Friday, Holy Saturday, and Easter Sunday. The days of the Easter Triduum recall Christ's last supper with his disciples, his capture and passion, his death on the cross, burial, and resurrection.
6. The seven-week liturgical Eastertide immediately follows the Triduum, climaxing at Pentecost. This last feast recalls the descent of the Holy Spirit upon Jesus' disciples after the Ascension of Jesus.
7. The remaining period of ordinary time includes the period between Eastertide and the start of Advent.

There are many forms of liturgy in the Catholic Church. Even putting aside the many Eastern rites in use, the Latin liturgical rites alone include the Ambrosian Rite, the Mozarabic Rite, and the Cistercian Rite, as well as other forms that have been largely abandoned in favour of adopting the Roman Rite. There are also historical versions of the liturgy that varied greatly from the present one, such those used by the Anglo-Saxon Church.

The liturgical calendar in that form of the Roman Rite (see General Roman Calendar) of 1960 differs in some respects from that of the present form of the Roman Rite.

==== Lutheran Churches ====
Lutheran church year

==== Anglican Church ====
The Church of England, Mother Church of the Anglican Communion, uses a liturgical year that is in most respects identical to that of the 1969 Catholic Common Lectionary. While the calendars contained within the Book of Common Prayer and the Alternative Service Book (1980) have no "Ordinary Time", Common Worship (2000) adopted the ecumenical 1983 Revised Common Lectionary. The few exceptions are Sundays following Christmas and Transfiguration, observed on the last Sunday before Lent instead of on Reminiscere.

In some Anglican traditions (including the Church of England) the Christmas season is followed by an Epiphany season, which begins on the Eve of the Epiphany (on January 6 or the Sunday after January 1) and ends on the Feast of the Presentation (on February 2 or the Sunday after January 27). Ordinary Time begins after this period. Traditionally, within Anglicanism, Sundays are counted after Trinity rather than after Pentecost, and the season is called “Trinitytide” rather than “Ordinary Time”.

The Book of Common Prayer contains within it the traditional Western Eucharistic lectionary which traces its roots to the Comes of St. Jerome in the 5th century. Its similarity to the ancient lectionary is particularly obvious during Trinity season (Sundays after the Sunday after Pentecost), reflecting that understanding of sanctification.

==== Reformed Churches ====
Reformed Christians emphasize weekly celebration of the Lord's Day. While some of them celebrate also what they call the five evangelical feasts, others celebrate no holy days but the Lord's Day and reject the liturgical year as non-scriptural, and as therefore inconsistent with the regulative principle of worship.

=== Liturgical calendar ===
==== Advent ====
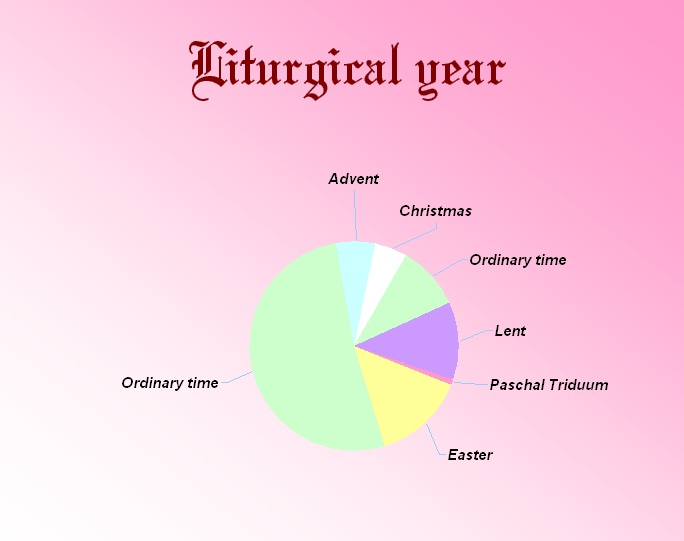
Roman Rite liturgical year

Advent (from the Latin word adventus, which means "arrival" or "coming") is the first season of the liturgical year. It begins four Sundays before Christmas, the Sunday falling on or nearest to November 30, and ends on Christmas Eve. Traditionally observed as a "fast", it focuses on preparation for the coming of Christ, not only the coming of the Christ-child at Christmas, but also, in the first weeks, on the eschatological final coming of Christ, making Advent "a period for devout and joyful expectation".

This season is often marked by the Advent Wreath, a garland of evergreens with four candles. Although the main symbolism of the advent wreath is simply marking the progression of time, many churches attach themes to each candle, most often 'hope', 'faith', 'joy', and 'love'. Other popular devotions during Advent include the use of the Advent Calendar or the Tree of Jesse to count down the days to Christmas.

Liturgical colour: violet or purple; blue in some traditions, such as Anglican/Episcopalian, Methodist, and Lutheran.

==== Christmastide ====
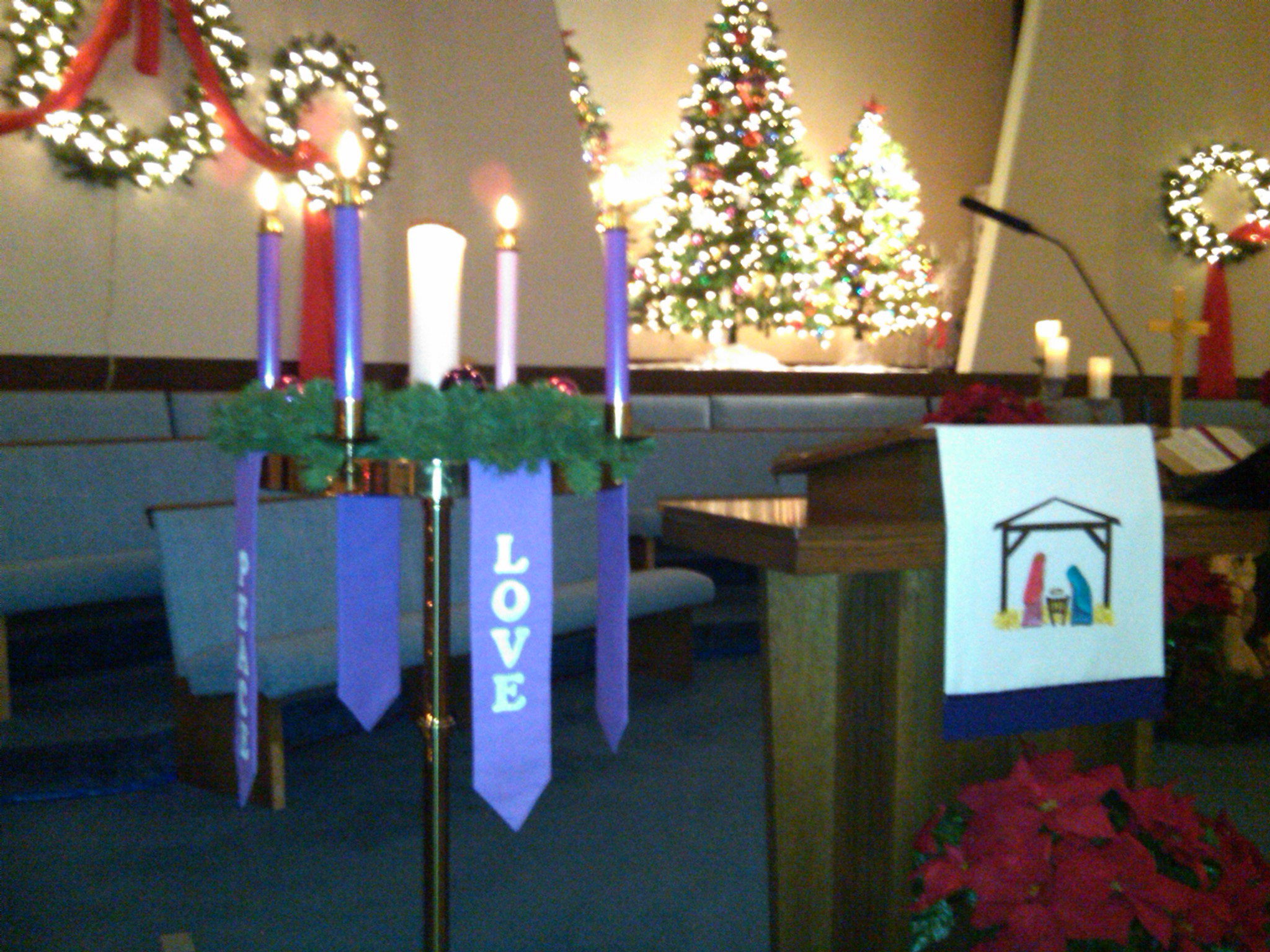
A white coloured parament hangs from the pulpit, indicating that the current liturgical season is Christmastide. The fact that the Christ Candle in the centre of the Advent wreath is lit also indicates that Christmas has arrived.

The Christmas season immediately follows Advent. The traditional Twelve Days of Christmas begin with Christmas Eve on the evening of December 24 and continue until the feast of Epiphany. The actual Christmas season continues until the Feast of the Baptism of Christ, which is celebrated on the Sunday after January 6, or the following Monday if that Sunday is kept as Epiphany.

In the pre-1970 form, this feast is celebrated on January 13, unless January 13 is a Sunday, in which case the feast of the Holy Family is celebrated instead. Until the suppression of the Octave of the Epiphany in the 1960 reforms, January 13 was the Octave day of the Epiphany, providing the date for the end of the season.

Traditionally, the end of Christmastide was February 2, or the Feast of the Presentation of the Lord, also known as Candlemas. This feast recounts the 40 days of rest Mary took before being purified and presenting her first-born son to the Temple in Jerusalem. In medieval times, Candlemas eve (Feb. 1st) marked the day when all Christmas decorations, including the Christmas tree and the Nativity scene, were taken down. However, the tradition of ending Christmastide on Candlemas has slowly waned, except in some pockets of the Hispanic world where Candlemas (or La Fiesta de la Candelaria) is still an important feast and the unofficial end of the Christmas season.

Liturgical colour: white

==== Ordinary Time ====
"Ordinary" comes from the same root as our word "ordinal", and in this sense means "the counted weeks". In the Catholic Church and in some Protestant traditions, these are the common weeks which do not belong to a proper season. In Latin, these seasons are called the weeks per annum, or "through the year".

In the current form of the Roman Rite adopted following the Second Vatican Council, Ordinary Time consists of 33 or 34 Sundays and is divided into two sections. The first portion extends from the day following the Feast of the Baptism of Christ until the day before Ash Wednesday (the beginning of Lent). It contains anywhere from three to eight Sundays, depending on how early or late Easter falls.

The main focus in the readings of the Mass is Christ's earthly ministry, rather than any one particular event. The counting of the Sundays resumes following Eastertide; however, two Sundays are replaced by Pentecost and Trinity Sunday, and depending on whether the year has 52 or 53 weeks, one may be omitted.

In the pre-1970 form of the Roman Rite, the Time after Epiphany has anywhere from one to six Sundays. As in the current form of the rite, the season mainly concerns Christ's preaching and ministry, with many of his parables read as the Gospel readings. The season begins on January 14 and ends on the Saturday before Septuagesima Sunday. Omitted Sundays after Epiphany are transferred to Time after Pentecost and celebrated between the Twenty-Third and the Last Sunday after Pentecost according to an order indicated in the Code of Rubrics, 18, with complete omission of any for which there is no Sunday available in the current year. Before the 1960 revisions, the omitted Sunday would be celebrated on the Saturday before Septuagesima Sunday, or, in the case of the Twenty-Third Sunday after Pentecost, on the Saturday before the Last Sunday after Pentecost.

Liturgical colour: green

==== Pre-Lent ====
Gregory the Great is the first to document a period of preparation for Easter beginning with Septuagesima, whose name refers to a period of around seventy days before Easter. This pre-Lenten period lasts two and a half weeks, encompassing Sexagesima and Quinquagesima. It concludes with Carnival and Shrove Tuesday.

This period opens an educational period leading up to the reception of catechumens at Easter. Events such as mystery plays from the Old Testament performed during this period historically supported this instructional campaign, reflecting the traditional lectionary for the Canonical hours, which begins on Septuagesima with the Book of Genesis, as is still reflected in the Book of Common Prayer.

The pre-Lenten liturgy introduces some customs of Lent, including the suppression of the Alleluia and its replacement at Mass with the Tract. The Gloria is no longer said on Sundays.

The 1969 reform of the Roman Rite subsumed these weeks liturgically into Ordinary Time, but Carnival is still widely celebrated. A pre-Lenten provision continues in many Anglican and Lutheran liturgies.

Liturgical colour (where observed): violet or purple

==== Lent and Passiontide ====
Lent is a major penitential season of preparation for Easter. It begins on Ash Wednesday and, if the penitential days of Good Friday and Holy Saturday are included, lasts for forty days, since the six Sundays within the season are not counted.

In the Roman Rite, the Gloria in Excelsis Deo and the Te Deum are not used in the Mass and Liturgy of the Hours respectively, except on Solemnities and Feasts, and the Alleluia and verse that usually precede the reading of the Gospel is either omitted or replaced with another acclamation.

Lutheran churches make these same omissions.

As in Advent, the deacon and subdeacon of the pre-1970 form of the Roman Rite do not wear their habitual dalmatic and tunicle (signs of joy) in Masses of the season during Lent; instead they wear "folded chasubles", in accordance with the ancient custom.

In the pre-1970 form of the Roman Rite, the two weeks before Easter form the season of Passiontide, a subsection of the Lenten season that begins with Matins of Ash Wednesday and ends immediately before the Mass of the Easter Vigil. In this form, what used to be officially called Passion Sunday, has the official name of the First Sunday in Passiontide, and Palm Sunday has the additional name of the Second Sunday in Passiontide. In Sunday and ferial Masses (but not on feasts celebrated in the first of these two weeks) the Gloria Patri is omitted at the Entrance Antiphon and at the Lavabo, as well as in the responds in the Divine Office.

In the post-1969 form of the Roman Rite, "Passion Sunday" and "Palm Sunday" are both names for the Sunday before Easter, officially called "Palm Sunday of the Lord's Passion". The former Passion Sunday became a fifth Sunday of Lent. The earlier form reads Matthew's account on Sunday, Mark's on Tuesday, and Luke's on Wednesday, while the post-1969 form reads the Passion only on Palm Sunday (with the three Synoptic Gospels arranged in a three-year cycle) and on Good Friday, when it reads the Passion according to John, as also do earlier forms of the Roman Rite.

The veiling of crucifixes and images of the saints with violet cloth, which was obligatory before 1970, is left to the decision of the national bishops' conferences. In the United States, it is permitted but not required, at the discretion of the pastor. In all forms, the readings concern the events leading up to the Last Supper and the betrayal, Passion, and death of Christ.

The week before Easter is called Holy Week.

In the Roman Rite, feasts that fall within that week are simply omitted, unless they have the rank of Solemnity, in which case they are transferred to another date. The only solemnities inscribed in the General Calendar that can fall within that week are those of Saint Joseph and the Annunciation.

Liturgical colour: violet or purple. The colour rose may be used, where it is the practice, on Laetare Sunday (4th Sunday of Lent). On Palm Sunday the colour since 1970 is red, by earlier rules violet or purple, with red being used after 1955 for the blessing of the palms.

==== Easter Triduum ====
The Easter Triduum consists of Good Friday, Holy Saturday and Easter Sunday. Each of these days begins liturgically not with the morning but with the preceding evening.

The triduum begins on the evening before Good Friday with Mass of the Lord's Supper, celebrated with white vestments, and often includes a ritual of ceremonial footwashing. It is customary on this night for a vigil involving private prayer to take place, beginning after the evening service and continuing until midnight. This vigil is occasionally renewed at dawn, continuing until the Good Friday liturgy.

During the day of Good Friday Mass is not celebrated in the Catholic Church. Instead a Celebration of the Passion of the Lord is held in the afternoon or evening. It consists of three parts: a Liturgy of the Word that includes the reading of the account of the Passion by John the Evangelist and concludes with a solemn Universal Prayer. Other churches also have their Good Friday commemoration of the Passion.

The colour of vestments varies: no colour, red, or black are used in different traditions. Coloured hangings may be removed. Lutheran churches often either remove colourful adornments and icons, or veil them with drab cloth. The service is usually plain with somber music, ending with the congregation leaving in silence. In the Catholic, some Lutheran, and High Anglican rites, a crucifix (not necessarily the one which stands on or near the altar on other days of the year) is ceremoniously unveiled. Other crucifixes are unveiled, without ceremony, after the service.

Holy Saturday commemorates the day during which Christ lay in the tomb. In the Catholic Church, there is no Mass on this day; the Easter Vigil Mass, which, though celebrated properly at the following midnight, is often celebrated in the evening, is an Easter Mass. With no liturgical celebration, there is no question of a liturgical colour.

The Easter Vigil is held in the night between Holy Saturday and Easter Sunday, to celebrate the resurrection of Jesus. See also Paschal candle. The liturgical colour is white, often together with gold. In the Roman Rite, during the "Gloria in Excelsis Deo" the organ and bells are used in the liturgy for the first time in two days, and the statues, which have been veiled during Passiontide (at least in the Roman Rite through the 1962 version), are unveiled. In Lutheran churches, colours and icons are re-displayed as well.

==== Eastertide ====
Easter is the celebration of Jesus' Resurrection. The date of Easter varies from year to year, according to a lunar-calendar dating system (see computus for details). In the Roman Rite, the Easter season extends from the Easter Vigil through Pentecost Sunday. In the pre-1970 form of the rite, this season includes also the Octave of Pentecost, so Eastertide lasts until None of the following Saturday.

In the Roman Rite, the Easter octave allows no other feasts to be celebrated or commemorated during it; a solemnity, such as the Annunciation, falling within it is transferred to the following Monday. If Easter Sunday or Easter Monday falls on April 25, the Greater Litanies, which in the pre-1970 form of the Roman Rite are on that day, are transferred to the following Tuesday.

By a decree of May 5, 2000, the Second Sunday of Easter (the Sunday after Easter Day itself), is known also in the Roman Rite as the Feast of the Divine Mercy.

Ascension Thursday, which celebrates the return of Jesus to heaven following his resurrection, is the fortieth day of Easter, but, in places where it is not observed as a Holy Day of Obligation, the post-1969 form of the Roman rite transfers it to the following Sunday.

Pentecost is the fiftieth and last day of the Easter season. It celebrates the sending of the Holy Spirit to the Apostles, which traditionally marks the birth of the Church, see also Apostolic Age.

Liturgical colour: white, but red on the feast of Pentecost.

==== Ordinary Time, Time after Pentecost, Time after Trinity, or Kingdomtide ====
This season, under various names, follows the Easter season and the feasts of Easter, Ascension, and Pentecost. In the post-1969 form of the Roman rite, Ordinary Time resumes on Pentecost Monday, omitting the Sunday which would have fallen on Pentecost. In the earlier form, where Pentecost is celebrated with an octave, the Time after Pentecost begins at Vespers on the Saturday after Pentecost. The Sundays resume their numbering at the point that will make the Sunday before Advent the thirty-fourth, omitting any weeks for which there is no room (present-day form of the Roman Rite) or are numbered as "Sundays after Pentecost" (pre-1970 Roman Rite, Eastern Orthodoxy and some Protestants) or as "Sundays after Trinity" (some Protestants). This season ends on the Saturday before the First Sunday of Advent.

Feasts during this season include:

- Trinity Sunday, the first Sunday after Pentecost
- Solemnity of the Most Holy Body and Blood of Christ (Roman Rite and some Anglican and Lutheran traditions), Thursday of the second week after Pentecost, often celebrated on the following Sunday
- Solemnity of the Most Sacred Heart of Jesus (Roman Rite), Friday of the third week after Pentecost
- Assumption of Mary on August 15
- Feast of Creation on September 1
- Feast of Christ the King, last Sunday before Advent (Roman Rite, Lutherans, Anglicans) or last Sunday in October (1925–1969 form of the Roman Rite)

In the final few weeks of Ordinary Time, many churches direct attention to the coming of the Kingdom of God, thus ending the liturgical year with an eschatological theme that is one of the predominant themes of the season of Advent that began the liturgical year. For instance, in the extraordinary form of the Roman Rite, the Gospel of the Last Sunday is Matthew 24:15–35 and in the ordinary form of the Roman Rite all the last three Sundays of the liturgical year are affected by the theme of the Second Coming.

While the Roman Rite adopts no special designation for this final part of Ordinary Time, some denominations do, and may also change the liturgical colour. The Church of England uses the term "Sundays before Advent" for the final four Sundays and permits red vestments as an alternative. The United Methodist Church may use the name "Kingdomtide".

==== Calendar of saints ====
- In some Protestant traditions, especially those with closer ties to the Lutheran tradition, Reformation Sunday is celebrated on the Sunday preceding October 31, commemorating the purported day Martin Luther posted the 95 Theses on the door of the Castle Church in Wittenberg. The liturgical colour is red, celebrating the Holy Spirit's continuing work in renewing the Church.
- Most Western traditions celebrate All Saints' Day (All Hallow's Day) on November 1 or the Sunday following, with the eve of this feast, All Hallow's Eve being October 31. The liturgical colour is white. The following day, November 2, is All Souls' Day. The period including these days is often referred to as Allhallowtide or Allsaintstide.
- Saints Days are observed by Lutherans and include the apostles, Virgin Mary and noteworthy figures in the Christian faith. The Confession of St. Peter Week of Prayer for Christian Unity starting on January 18. Conversion of St. Paul ended week of prayer on January 25. Martin Luther King Jr., renewer of society, martyr January 15 (Evangelical Lutheran Church in America only), Presentation of Our Lord and Purification of the Mary Candlemas on February 2. Joseph, Guardian of Jesus St Joseph on March 19, Annunciation March 25, Visitation of Mary on May 31.
- Lutherans also celebrate St John the Baptist or the Beheading of St John the Baptist on June 24, St Mary Magdalene July 22, St. Mary, Mother of Our Lord or the Assumption of the Blessed Virgin Mary on August 15, Holy Cross Day September 14, Francis of Assisi, renewal of the Church St. Francis of Assisi on October 4, and the Holy Innocents, Martyrs December 28.
- Lesser Feasts and Commemorations on the Lutheran liturgical calendar include Anthony of Egypt on January 17, Henry, Bishop of Uppsala, martyr Henry of Uppsala on January 19, Timothy, Titus and Silas, missionaries St Timothy, St Titus and St Silas Day on January 26, Ansgar, Bishop of Hamburg, missionary to Denmark and Sweden St Ansgar on February 3, Cyril, monk and Methodius, bishop, missionaries to the Slavs St Cyril and St Methodius on February 14, Gregory the Great on March 12, St Patrick on March 17, Olavus Petri, priest and Laurentius Petri, Bishop of Uppsala, on April 19, St Anselm on April 21, Catherine of Siena on April 29, St Athanasius on May 2, St Monica on May 4, Eric IX of Sweden on May 18, St Boniface on June 5, Basil the Great, Gregory of Nyssa and Gregory of Nazianzus on June 14, Benedict of Nursia on July 11, Birgitta of Sweden on July 23, St Anne, Mother of Mary on July 26, St Dominic on August 8, Augustine of Hippo on August 28, St Cyprian on September 16, Teresa of Avila on October 15, Martin de Porres on November 3, Martin of Tours on November 11, Elizabeth of Hungary on November 17, St Lucy on December 13. There are many other holy days in the Lutheran calendar.
- Some traditions celebrate St. Michael's Day (Michaelmas) on September 29.
- Some traditions celebrate St. Martin's Day (Martinmas) on November 11.

Liturgical colours: white if the saint was not martyred; red if the saint was martyred

===== Hierarchy of feast days =====
There are degrees of solemnity of the office of the feast days of saints. In the 13th century, the Roman Rite distinguished three ranks: simple, semidouble and double, with consequent differences in the recitation of the Divine Office or Breviary. The simple feast commenced with the chapter (capitulum) of First Vespers, and ended with None. It had three lessons and took the psalms of Matins from the ferial office; the rest of the office was like the semidouble. The semidouble feast had two Vespers, nine lessons in Matins, and ended with Compline. The antiphons before the psalms were only intoned.

In the Mass, the semidouble had always at least three "orationes" or collects. On a double feast the antiphons were sung in their entirety, before and after the psalms, while in Lauds and Vespers there were no suffragia of the saints, and the Mass had only one "oratio" (if no commemoration was prescribed). If ordinary double feasts (referred to also as lesser doubles) occurred with feasts of a higher rank, they could be simplified, except the octave days of some feasts and the feasts of the Doctors of the Church, which were transferred.

To the existing distinction between major and ordinary or minor doubles, Pope Clement VIII added two more ranks, those of first-class or second-class doubles. Some of these two classes were kept with octaves. This was still the situation when the 1907 article Ecclesiastical Feasts in the Catholic Encyclopedia was written. In accordance with the rules then in force, feast days of any form of double, if impeded by "occurrence" (falling on the same day) with a feast day of higher class, were transferred to another day.

Pope Pius X simplified matters considerably in his 1911 reform of the Roman Breviary. In the case of occurrence the lower-ranking feast day could become a commemoration within the celebration of the higher-ranking one. Until then, ordinary doubles took precedence over most of the semidouble Sundays, resulting in many of the Sunday Masses rarely being said. While retaining the semidouble rite for Sundays, Pius X's reform permitted only the most important feast days to be celebrated on Sunday, although commemorations were still made until Pope John XXIII's reform of 1960.

The division into doubles (of various kinds) semidoubles and simples continued until 1955, when Pope Pius XII abolished the rank of semidouble, making all the previous semidoubles simples, and reducing the previous simples to a mere commemoration in the Mass of another feast day or of the feria on which they fell (see General Roman Calendar of Pope Pius XII).

Then, in 1960, Pope John XXIII issued the Code of Rubrics, completely ending the ranking of feast days by doubles etc., and replacing it by a ranking, applied not only to feast days but to all liturgical days, as I, II, III, and IV class days.

The 1969 revision by Pope Paul VI divided feast days into "solemnities", "feasts" and "memorials", corresponding approximately to Pope John XXIII's I, II and III class feast days. Commemorations were abolished. While some of the memorials are considered obligatory, others are optional, permitting a choice on some days between two or three memorials, or between one or more memorials and the celebration of the feria. On a day to which no obligatory celebration is assigned, the Mass may be of any saint mentioned in the Roman Martyrology for that day.

===== Assumption of Mary =====
Observed by Catholics and some Anglicans on August 15, which is the same as the Eastern and Orthodox feast of the Dormition, the end of the earthly life of the Virgin Mary and, for some, her bodily Assumption into heaven, is celebrated. The teaching on this dogma was summed by Pope Pius XII in his bull Munificentissimus Deus of 1 November 1950.

In other Anglican and Lutheran traditions, as well as a few others, August 15 is celebrated as St. Mary, Mother of the Lord.

Liturgical colour: white

== Secular observance ==
Because of the dominance of Christianity in Europe throughout the Middle Ages, many features of the Christian year became incorporated into the secular calendar. Many of its feasts (e.g., Christmas, Mardi Gras, Saint Patrick's Day) remain holidays, and are now celebrated by people of all faiths and none—in some cases worldwide. The secular celebrations bear varying degrees of likeness to the religious feasts from which they derived, often also including elements of ritual from pagan festivals of similar date.

== Comparison ==
| Date Range | East Syriac | Eastern Orthodox | | Western | |
| Date Range | Season | Season | Celebration | Season | Celebration |
Counting in relation to Christmas
| November 15 | Dedication of the church (Qudas Edta) | Nativity Fast (40 days) | | | |
| 5th Sunday before Christmas | Dedication of the church (Qudas Edta) | Nativity Fast (40 days) | | | Christ the King Sunday |
| 4th Sunday before Christmas | Annunciation (Suvara) | Nativity Fast (40 days) | | Advent | Beginning of the Western Liturgical Calendar |
| 3rd Sunday before Christmas | Annunciation (Suvara) | Nativity Fast (40 days) | | Advent | |
| 2nd Sunday before Christmas | Annunciation (Suvara) | Nativity Fast (40 days) | | Advent | Gaudete Sunday |
| 1st Sunday before Christmas | Annunciation (Suvara) | Nativity Fast (40 days) | | Advent | |
| December 24 | Annunciation (Suvara) | Nativity Fast (40 days) | | | Christmas Eve |
| December 25 | Christmastide | Christmas | | Christmastide | Christmas |
| December 25 to January 5 (includes 1 to 2 Sundays) | Christmastide | | | Christmastide | |
Counting in relation to Epiphany
| January 6 | Epiphany (Denha) | Epiphany (Theophany) | | Christmastide | Epiphany |
| 1st Sunday after Epiphany | Epiphany (Denha) | | | Christmastide | Baptism of Jesus |
| Varies between zero and four Sundays | Epiphany (Denha) | | | Ordinary Time (After Epiphany) | |
Counting in relation to Easter
| 11th Sunday before Easter | Epiphany (Denha) | | Zaccheaus Sunday (Slavic) or Sunday of the Canaanite (Greek) | Ordinary Time (After Epiphany) | |
| 10th Sunday before Easter | Epiphany (Denha) | Pre-Lent | The Publican and the Pharisee | Ordinary Time (After Epiphany) | |
| 9th Sunday before Easter | Epiphany (Denha) | Pre-Lent | The Prodigal Son | Ordinary Time (After Epiphany) | |
| 8th Sunday before Easter | Epiphany (Denha) | Pre-Lent | The Last Judgement or Meat-Fare Sunday | Ordinary Time (After Epiphany) | |
| 7th Sunday before Easter | Great Fast (Sawma Rabba) | Pre-Lent | The Sunday of Forgiveness or Cheesefare Sunday | Ordinary Time (After Epiphany) | Transfiguration Sunday |
| 48 days before Easter | Great Fast (Sawma Rabba) | Great Lent (40 days, including 5 Sundays) | Clean Monday | Ordinary Time (After Epiphany) | |
| 46 days before Easter | Great Fast (Sawma Rabba) | Great Lent (40 days, including 5 Sundays) | | Lent (38 days and 6 Sundays, 44 days total) | Ash Wednesday |
| 6th Sunday before Easter | Great Fast (Sawma Rabba) | Great Lent (40 days, including 5 Sundays) | Triumph of Orthodoxy | Lent (38 days and 6 Sundays, 44 days total) | |
| 5th Sunday before Easter | Great Fast (Sawma Rabba) | Great Lent (40 days, including 5 Sundays) | St. Gregory Palamas | Lent (38 days and 6 Sundays, 44 days total) | |
| 4th Sunday before Easter | Great Fast (Sawma Rabba) | Great Lent (40 days, including 5 Sundays) | Adoration of the Cross | Lent (38 days and 6 Sundays, 44 days total) | |
| 3rd Sunday before Easter | Great Fast (Sawma Rabba) | Great Lent (40 days, including 5 Sundays) | St. John of the Ladder | Lent (38 days and 6 Sundays, 44 days total) | |
| 2nd Sunday before Easter | Great Fast (Sawma Rabba) | Great Lent (40 days, including 5 Sundays) | St. Mary of Egypt | Lent (38 days and 6 Sundays, 44 days total) | |
| 8 days before Easter | Great Fast (Sawma Rabba) | Great and Holy Week (7 days including, 1 Sunday) | Lazarus Saturday | Lent (38 days and 6 Sundays, 44 days total) | |
| 1st Sunday before Easter | Great Fast (Sawma Rabba) | Great and Holy Week (7 days including, 1 Sunday) | Palm Sunday | Lent (38 days and 6 Sundays, 44 days total) | Palm Sunday |
| Monday before Easter | Great Fast (Sawma Rabba) | Great and Holy Week (7 days including, 1 Sunday) | Great and Holy Monday | Lent (38 days and 6 Sundays, 44 days total) | Holy Monday |
| Tuesday before Easter | Great Fast (Sawma Rabba) | Great and Holy Week (7 days including, 1 Sunday) | Great and Holy Tuesday | Lent (38 days and 6 Sundays, 44 days total) | Holy Tuesday |
| Wednesday before Easter | Great Fast (Sawma Rabba) | Great and Holy Week (7 days including, 1 Sunday) | Great and Holy Wednesday | Lent (38 days and 6 Sundays, 44 days total) | Holy or Spy Wednesday |
| Thursday before Easter | Great Fast (Sawma Rabba) | Great and Holy Week (7 days including, 1 Sunday) | Great and Holy Thursday | Lent (38 days and 6 Sundays, 44 days total) | Maundy Thursday |
| Friday before Easter | Great Fast (Sawma Rabba) | Great and Holy Week (7 days including, 1 Sunday) | Great and Holy Friday | Paschal Triduum | Good Friday |
| Saturday before Easter | Great Fast (Sawma Rabba) | Great and Holy Week (7 days including, 1 Sunday) | Great and Holy Saturday | Paschal Triduum | Holy Saturday |
| Easter Sunday | Resurrection (Qyamta) | Pentecostarion (Paschaltide) | Great and Holy Pascha | Paschal Triduum | Easter |
| Week after Easter | Resurrection (Qyamta) | Pentecostarion (Paschaltide) | Bright Week | Eastertide | |
| 1st Sunday after Easter | Resurrection (Qyamta) | Pentecostarion (Paschaltide) | Thomas Sunday | Eastertide | Divine Mercy Sunday |
| 2nd Sunday after Easter | Resurrection (Qyamta) | Pentecostarion (Paschaltide) | The Holy Myrrhbearers | Eastertide | |
| 3rd Sunday after Easter | Resurrection (Qyamta) | Pentecostarion (Paschaltide) | The Paralytic | Eastertide | |
| 25 days after Easter (Wednesday) | Resurrection (Qyamta) | Pentecostarion (Paschaltide) | Mid-Pentecost | Eastertide | |
| 4th Sunday after Easter | Resurrection (Qyamta) | Pentecostarion (Paschaltide) | The Samaritan Woman | Eastertide | |
| 5th Sunday after Easter | Resurrection (Qyamta) | Pentecostarion (Paschaltide) | The Blind Man | Eastertide | |
| 40th day after Easter (Thursday) | Resurrection (Qyamta) | Pentecostarion (Paschaltide) | Ascension of Jesus | Eastertide | Ascension of Jesus |
| 6th Sunday after Easter | Resurrection (Qyamta) | Pentecostarion (Paschaltide) | The Fathers of the First Ecumenical Council | Eastertide | |
| 7th Sunday after Easter | Apostles (Slihe) | Pentecostarion (Paschaltide) | Pentecost | Eastertide | Pentecost |
Counting in relation to Pentecost
| 1st Sunday after Pentecost | Apostles (Slihe) | Pentecostarion (Paschaltide) | All Saints | Ordinary Time (After Pentecost) | Trinity Sunday |
| 8 days after Pentecost (Monday) | Apostles (Slihe) | Pentecostarion (Paschaltide) | Apostles' Fast begins (ends June 29) | Ordinary Time (After Pentecost) | |
| 2nd Sunday after Pentecost | Apostles (Slihe) | Pentecostarion (Paschaltide) | | Ordinary Time (After Pentecost) | |
| 7th Sunday after Pentecost | Summer (Qaita) | | | Ordinary Time (After Pentecost) | |
| August 1 to August 14 | | Dormition Fast | | Ordinary Time (After Pentecost) | |
| 14th Sunday after Pentecost | Eliyah-Sliba-Moses | | | Ordinary Time (After Pentecost) | |
| September 1 | | | Beginning of Eastern Liturgical Year | Ordinary Time (After Pentecost) | |
| 20th to 25th Sunday after Pentecost (Sunday between October 30 and November 5) | Dedication of the church (Qudas Edta) | | | Ordinary Time (After Pentecost) | All Saints' Sunday |

== See also ==
- Christian worship – Act of attributing reverent honour and homage to God
- Quarter tense – Three days of fasting and prayer, occurring quarterly
