= Season of Summer =

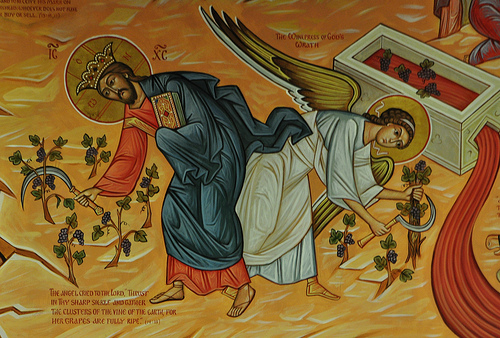
An imaginative depiction of Jesus and an angel as harvesters.

The Season of Summer (also known by various Syriac transliterations such as Kaitha or Qaita) is a liturgical season in the East Syriac Rite of Christianity. The season begins on the seventh Sunday after Pentecost (just after the conclusion of the Season of Apostles) and continues for seven weeks. The Season of Summer has a theme of spiritual harvest, reflecting on the fruits of the missionary labors of the Apostles.

== Fridays of Summer ==
The Fridays of various weeks of this liturgical season are dedicated to various martyrs.

- First Friday of Summer: St. James of Nisibis
- Second Friday of Summer: St. Mari
- Fifth Friday of Summer: St. Simoni and seven sons
- Sixth Sunday of Summer: St. Simon Barsaba and co-martyrs
