= Season of Apostles =

The Season of Apostles (also known by various Syriac transliterations, such as Slihe and Shleehe) is a liturgical season in East Syriac Christianity. The season begins with the feast of Pentecost and continues for seven weeks. The season ends on the feast of the 12 apostles, June 30. It is followed by the Season of Summer.

The season is so named because it commemorates the missionary activities of the apostles of Jesus after the events of Pentecost.

The following feasts are fixed to certain days in the Season of Apostles:

- Friday after Pentecost: Friday of Gold
- Friday after the Seventh Sunday of Apostles: The Seventy Disciples of Jesus

The season ends with the Feast of the Twelve Apostles on the First Sunday of Summer

== See also ==
- Pentecost season
