= Sawma Rabba =

Eastern rite Christian liturgical season

Season of Great Fast
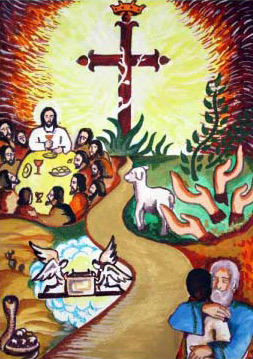
- Icon depicting the theme of Season of Great Fast
- Observed by: East Syriac Christians
- Type: Christian, cultural
- Significance: Commemoration of the 40 days fasting and Crucifixion of Jesus
- Observances: Church services
- Begins: 50 days before Resurrection Sunday
- Frequency: Annual
- Related to: Good Friday, Thursday of Pesha, Great Fast, Syro Malabar Church

Sawma Rabba (Syriac: ܨܲܘܡܵܐ ܪܲܒܵܐ) is the East Syriac liturgical season that begins seven weeks before Easter, falling during Great Lent, and culminates on Resurrection Sunday. It begins with Pētūrtta Sunday and extends precisely seven weeks until Easter. Among the descendant Churches of the Church of the East in India, the Sawma Rabba is popularly known as the Fifty days' fast, since Resurrection Sunday occurs at its fiftieth day.
