= List of movable Eastern Christian observances =

This is a chronological list of moveable Eastern Christian observances. Most of these are calculated by the date of Pascha. It includes secular observances which are calculated by religious observances.

This list does not necessarily imply either official status nor general observance.

== 2026 dates ==
=== February ===
11th Sunday before Pascha: February 2

- Zacchaeus Sunday/Sunday of the Canaanite

63 days before Pascha: February 8

- Feast of Saint Sarkis (Armenian Apostolic Church)

10th Sunday before Pascha: February 9

- Publican & Pharisee Sunday

Second Monday before Clean Monday: February 10–13

- Fast of Nineveh

9th Sunday before Pascha: February 16

- Sunday of the Prodigal Son

Thursday of the 8th week before Pascha: February 20

- Feast of Saint Vartan (Armenian Apostolic Church)

Sunday of Meatfare week: February 23

- Sunday of Last Judgement (Meat Fare Sunday)

Monday to Sunday following the 9th Sunday before Pascha: February 23-February 28

- Meatfare Week

Saturday of Meatfare Week: February 29

- Saturday of Souls

=== March ===
Monday to Sunday following Meatfare week: March 1–7

- Cheesefare Week

Sunday of Cheesefare week (Eastern Christianity): March 1

- Sunday of Forgiveness (Cheese-Fare Sunday)

Monday after Sunday of Forgiveness: March 2

- Great Lent begins
  - Clean Monday

First Saturday of Great Lent: March 7

- St. Theodore Saturday

First Sunday of Great Lent: March 8

- Feast of Orthodoxy

2nd Saturday of Lent: March 14

- Saturday of Souls

5th Sunday before Pascha and 2nd Sunday of Lent: March 15

- Sunday of St. Gregory Palamas

3rd Saturday of Lent: March 21

- Saturday of Souls

4th Saturday of Lent: March 28

- Saturday of Souls

4th Sunday before Pascha and 3rd Sunday of Lent: March 29

- Sunday of the Holy Cross

=== April ===
5th Saturday of Lent: April 4

- Saturday of the Akathist

3rd Sunday before Pascha and 4th Sunday of Lent: April 5

- Sunday of St. John Climacus

Day before Palm Sunday: April 11

- Lazarus Saturday
  - Lazareva Subota (Serbia)

5th Sunday of Lent: April 12

- Sunday of St. Mary of Egypt

Sunday before Pascha: April 12

- Palm Sunday
  - Flower's Day (Bulgaria)

Monday after Palm Sunday: April 13

- Great and Holy Monday

Tuesday after Palm Sunday: April 14

- Great and Holy Tuesday

Wednesday after Palm Sunday: April 15

- Great and Holy Wednesday

Thursday after Palm Sunday: April 16

- Great and Holy Thursday

Friday after Palm Sunday: April 17

- Great and Holy Friday

Saturday after Palm Sunday: April 18

- Great and Holy Saturday

April 19

- Pascha
  - Fasika (Ethiopian Orthodox Tewahedo Church)
  - Pentecostarion begins.

Monday after Pascha: April 20

- Bright Monday
  - Sham el-Nessim (Egypt)

Tuesday after Pascha: April 21

- Bright Tuesday

Wednesday after Pascha: April 22

- Bright Wednesday

Thursday after Pascha: April 23

- Bright Thursday

Friday after Pascha: April 24

- Bright Friday

Saturday after Pascha: April 25

- Bright Saturday

8th day after Pascha: April 26

- Thomas Sunday

2nd Tuesday of Pascha, or 2nd Monday of Pascha, depending on region: April 27

- Radonitsa (Russian Orthodox)

=== May ===
2nd Sunday following Pascha: May 3

- Sunday of the Myrrhbearers

4th Sunday of Pascha: May 10

- Sunday of the Paralytic

Wednesday after the Sunday of the Paralytic: May 13

- Mid-Pentecost

5th Sunday of Pascha: May 17

- Sunday of the Samaritan Woman

6th Sunday of Pascha: May 24

- Sunday of the Blind Man

Forty days after Pascha: May 28

- Feast of the Ascension
  - Heroes Day (Romania)

7th Saturday of Pascha: May 30

- Saturday of the Dead

7th Sunday of Pascha: May 31

- Sunday of the Holy Fathers

=== June ===
Fifty days after Pascha: June 7

- Pentecost
  - Trinity Sunday

Monday after Pentecost: June 8

- Monday of the Holy Spirit

Tuesday after Pentecost: June 9

- Third Day of the Trinity

First Sunday after Pentecost: June 14

- All Saints Sunday

64th day after Pascha: June 14

- Feast of the Cathedral of Holy Etchmiadzin (Armenian Apostolic Church)

Second Monday after Pentecost, the day after All Saints' Sunday: July 15

- Apostles' Fast

=== July ===
98 days/14 weeks after Pascha: July 19

- Vardavar (Armenia)

=== August ===
Sunday closest to August 15: August 16

- Dormition of the Mother of God (Armenian Apostolic Church)

=== September ===
Saturday closest to Sept.23, the Conception of Saint John the Forerunner, Russian Orthodox only: September 20

- Saturday of Souls

=== October ===
Saturday closest to October 26, feast day of Demetrius of Thessaloniki, Russian Orthodox only: October 25

- Demetrius Saturday

=== November ===
Sunday closest to November 11: November 14

- Remembrance Sunday (Cyprus only)

== See also ==
- List of movable Western Christian observances
