= Arpacaș =

Romanian basic food made from grains

Arpacaș is a Romanian basic food produced by husking and refining wheat, spelt, barley or millet. It is used for making coliva as well as soups, salads and for garnishing steak.

The word arpacaș comes from Hungarian árpakása.
