= Moveable feast =

Observance in a liturgical calendar with no fixed calendar date

A moveable feast is an observance in a Christian liturgical calendar which occurs on different dates in different years. It is the complement of a fixed feast, an annual celebration that is held on the same calendar date every year, such as Christmas.

== Spring paschal feasts ==
Often considered the most important Christian observance, Spring paschal feasts are a fixed number of days before or after Easter Sunday, which varies by 35 days since it depends partly on the phase of the moon and must be computed each year. In the Hebrew calendar, the new moon of Aviv, spring, is fixed as the Lunar New Year, and the month is called Nisan. The 14 of Nisan is the paschal full moon, the day of the Pesach seder, a ritual meal telling the story of the Exodus from Egypt. It is one of the three pilgrimage festivals incumbent on all Jewish males living in the land of Israel. For this observance of this mitzvah, commandment, Jesus and the disciples went to Jerusalem, and held a festive meal known as the Last Supper on Passover night according to the gospel of John (or the day before according to the synoptic gospels).

Quartodeciman Christians continued to end the Lenten fast in time to observe the Passover (Christian), which occurs before the Lord's day, as the two are not mutually exclusive. However, due to intense persecution from Nicene Christianity after the Easter controversy, the practice had mostly died out by the 5th or 6th century, and only re-emerged in the 20th century.

In Eastern Christianity (including the Eastern Orthodox Church, the Oriental Orthodox Churches, the Assyrian Church of the East, and the Eastern Catholic Churches), these moveable feasts form what is called the Paschal cycle, which stands in contrast to the approach taken by Catholic and Protestant Christianity.

== Moveable solemnities ==
Not all observances are feasts, and among those that are moveable is the Lenten fast, which is held for the 40 days prior to Easter.

== Relationship to solar fixed feasts ==
Most other feast days, such as those of particular saints, are fixed feasts, held on the same date every year. However, some observances are always held on the same day of the week, and thus occur on a range of days without depending on the date of Easter. For example, the start of Advent is the Sunday nearest November 30. In addition, the observance of some fixed feasts may move a few days in a particular year to not clash with that year's date for a more important moveable feast. There are rare examples of saints with genuinely moveable feast days, such as Saint Sarkis the Warrior in the calendar of the Armenian Church.

== In other religions ==
The Roman calendar possessed a number of moveable feasts (feriae conceptivae, "proclaimed festivals") like the Sementivae or Paganalia honoring Ceres and Tellus that varied to allow them to occur in the proper season and conditions. Michels has argued that such moveable feasts were probably universal before the adoption of the lunar-based nundinal cycle, the earliest Italian calendars most likely being observational and based on natural cycles like vernation and ripening.

The traditional Chinese calendar is lunisolar, as are others in East Asia based on it. This causes the timing of the Chinese New Year, the Mid-Autumn Festival, and several other holidays—all traditionally associated with various rituals and offerings—to vary within the Gregorian calendar, usually within a space of two months.

In Judaism, all holidays fixed to the lunisolar traditional calendar move relative to the Gregorian calendar, again usually within a space of two months. In addition, there are two observances that are moveable within both systems, being based on the Shmuelian tekufot approximations of the equinoxes and solstices established by Samuel of Nehardea. Samuel fixed them to the Julian calendar, which slowly slips out of alignment with the Gregorian over a span of several centuries. The first is the annual commencement of the sh'elah period during which diaspora Jews add a petition for rain to their daily prayers, which occurs on 23 November (Julian) in most years and on 24 November (Julian) when the following year will be a Julian leap year. The second is the Birkat Hachama ("Blessing of the Sun"), a ceremony performed once every 28 years, which always occurs on Wednesday, 26 March (Julian), in a Julian year of the form 28n+21.

In Islam, all holidays fixed to the lunar Islamic calendar vary completely within the Gregorian calendar, shifting by 10 or 11 days each year and moving through the entire Gregorian year over the course of about 33 years (making 34 Islamic years).

== See also ==
- Liturgical year
- Movable Eastern Christian observances
- Movable Western Christian observances
