= Pannychis =

Pannychis (Ancient Greek: παννυχίς, [pa.ny.kʰís]), from Greek words πᾶν ('all, every') and νύξ ('night'), may refer to:

- An all-night feast or ceremony of the ancient Eleusinian Mysteries
- Pannychis, a courtesan given by the Jewish king Herod the Great to the king of Cappodocia as thanks for reconciling a Herod family dispute
- Vigil, a period of purposeful sleeplessness, an occasion for devotional watching, or an observance
- Panichida (панихида), the name for Memorial service (Orthodox) in Slavic languages
- Pannychis (beetle), a longhorn beetle genus in the tribe Saperdini
