= Church of Mid-Pentecost, Rostov-on-Don =

Church in Rostov Oblast, Russia

Church of Mid-Pentecost
- Церковь Покрова Пресвятой Богородицы
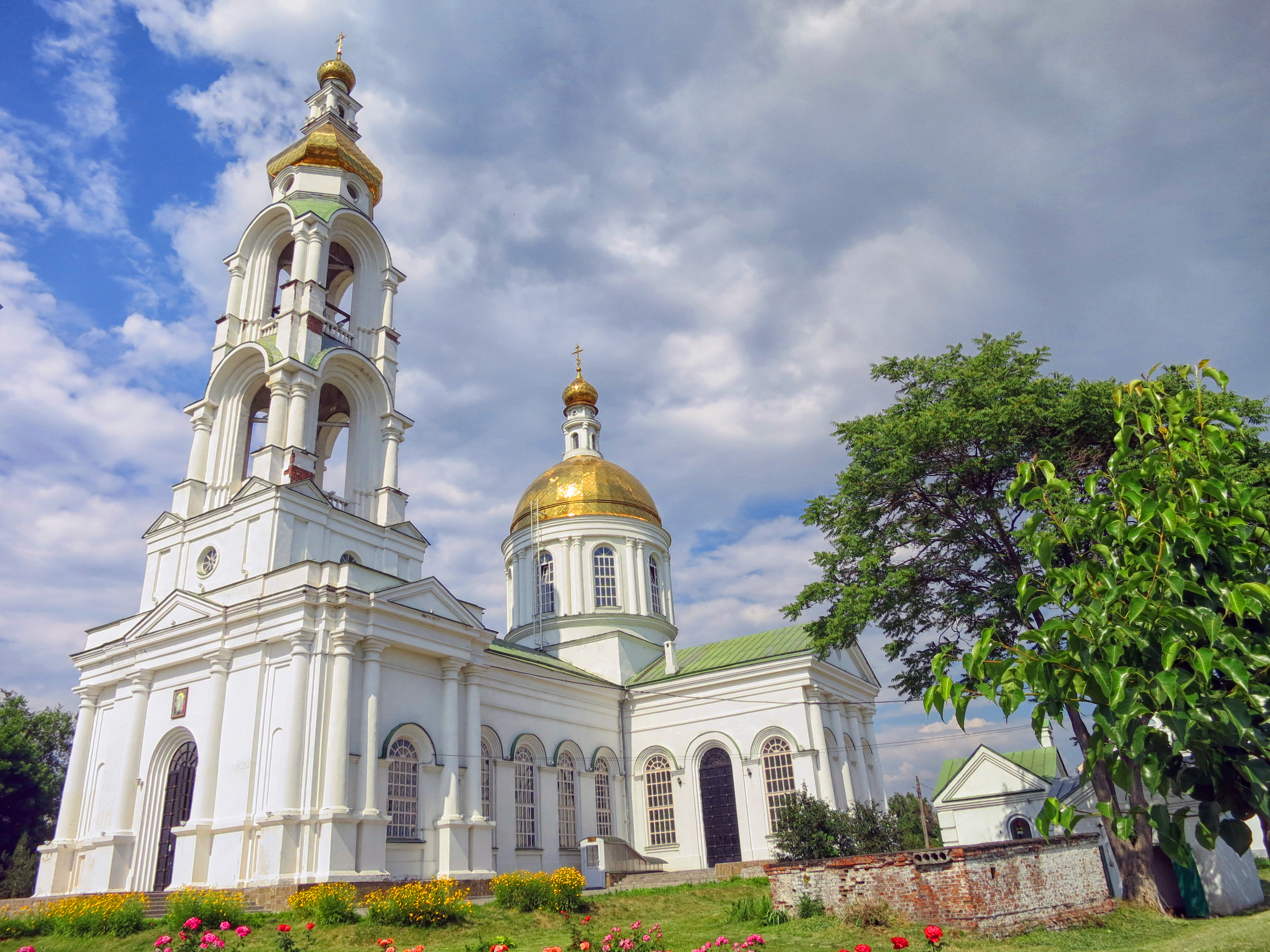
- Church of Mid-Pentecost
- 47.189985°N 39.63635°E
- Location: Rostov-on-Don, Russia
- Country: Russia
- Denomination: Russian Orthodox

History
- Status: Parish church
- Dedication: Mid-Pentecost

Architecture
- Completed: 1829

Administration
- Diocese: Diocese of Rostov and Novocherkassk

The Church of Mid-Pentecost (Russian: Церковь Преполовения Пятидесятницы) is a Russian Orthodox church in Rostov-on-Don, Russia that belongs to the Diocese of Rostov and Novocherkassk.

== History ==
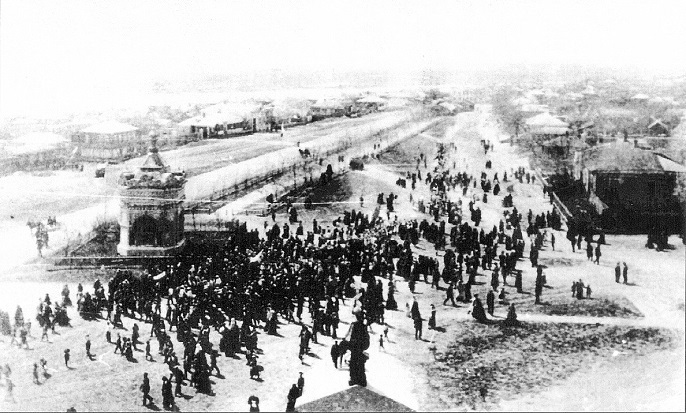
Hodegetria of Smolensk Chapel, 1894

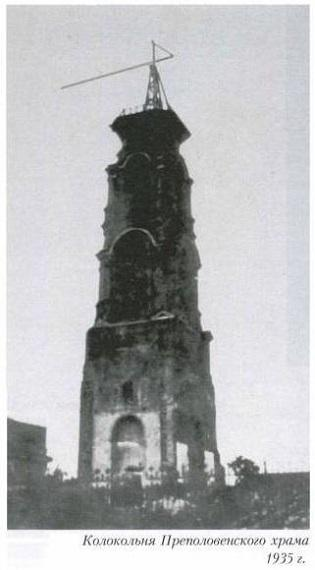
The church's bell tower that was used for parachute training, 1935

The first mentioning about the church dates to 1824–1829, when it was built in the cossack village of Nizhne-Gnilovskaya on the funds of local dwellers. This church was being built for about five years.

In 1892–1893, when a cholera outbreak in Rostov-on-Don died, a chapel dedicated to Hodegetria of Smolensk was built to honor deliverance from the disease.

During Russian Civil War, in Autumn of 1918, the church became a city center of the White movement.

In 1933 the church was closed and gradually destroyed. Its bell tower was used for parachute training for several years. The church building was almost totally destroyed in 1940, but in 1942 divine services continued to be held in the cellar. In 1959 they were prohibited at all and all the remaining church property was expropriated. At the building of the former parish school a cinema theatre was opened.

The church began to be renovated in 1996. In 1999 liturgies were already started to be held there.

== See also ==
- Mid-Pentecost
