= Paschal cycle =

Cycle of feasts in Eastern Orthodoxy

The Paschal cycle, in Eastern Orthodox Christianity, is the cycle of the moveable feasts built around Pascha (Easter). (Note: For fixed feasts, see Eastern Orthodox Church calendar. For this year's date for Pascha, see Easter. For the method used to calculate the date of Pascha, see Computus.) The cycle consists of approximately ten weeks before and seven weeks after Pascha. The ten weeks before Pascha are known as the period of the Triodion, referring to the liturgical book that contains the services for this liturgical season. This period includes the three weeks preceding Great Lent, the "pre-Lenten period", the forty days of Lent, and Holy Week. The 50 days following Pascha are called the Pentecostarion, also named after the liturgical book.

The Sunday of each week has a special commemoration, named for the Gospel reading assigned to that day. Certain other weekdays have special commemorations of their own. The entire cycle revolves around Pascha. The weeks before Pascha end on Sunday, i.e., the Week of the Prodigal Son begins on the Monday that follows the Publican and the Pharisee. This is because everything in the Lenten period is anticipatory of Pascha. Starting on Pascha, the weeks again begin on Sunday, i.e., Thomas Week begins on the Sunday of St. Thomas.

While the Pentecostarion closes after All Saints Sunday, the Paschal cycle continues throughout the year, until the beginning of the next Pre-Lenten period. The Tone of the Week, the Epistle and Gospel readings at the Divine Liturgy, and the 11 Matins Gospels with their accompanying hymns are dependent on it.

== Pre-Lent ==
- Zacchaeus Sunday (Slavic tradition) or Sunday of the Canaanite (Greek tradition): 11th Sunday before Pascha
- The Publican and the Pharisee: 10th Sunday before Pascha (70 days)
- The Prodigal Son: 9th Sunday before Pascha (63 days)
- The Last Judgment; also, Meat-Fare Sunday (the last day meat may be eaten): 8th Sunday before Pascha (56 days)
- Sunday of Forgiveness; also, Cheese-Fare Sunday (the last day dairy products may be consumed — during Great Lent fish, wine, and olive oil will be allowed only on certain days): 7th Sunday before Pascha (49 days)

== Great Lent ==
- Clean Monday, the actual beginning of Great Lent: 48 days before Pascha
- Theodore Saturday—1st Saturday in Great Lent—commemorating of the "miracle of the kolyva" (boiled wheat) by Theodore of Tyro during the reign of Julian the Apostate
- Triumph of Orthodoxy—1st Sunday of Lent—commemoration of the restoration of icons after the defeat of the iconoclast heresy in 843: 6th Sunday before Pascha (42 days)
- Memorial Saturdays—2nd, 3rd, and 4th Saturdays of Great Lent—commemorative Divine Liturgies and memorial services for the dead are celebrated
- Saint Gregory Palamas—2nd Sunday of Lent—5th Sunday before Pascha (35 days)
- Adoration of the Cross 4th Sunday before Pascha and 3rd Sunday of Lent (28 days)
- Saint John of the Ladder—3rd Sunday before Pascha and 4th Sunday of Lent—(21 days)
- Saturday of the Akathist—5th Saturday of Great Lent
- Saint Mary of Egypt—5th Sunday of Lent—2nd Sunday before Pascha (14 days)

== Great and Holy Week ==
- Lazarus Saturday, the beginning of Holy Week (8 days before Pascha)
- Palm Sunday, or the Triumphant Entry of Christ into Jerusalem: last Sunday before Pascha (7 days)
- Great and Holy Monday: Joseph the All-Comely (from the Old Testament), who was sold into slavery by his brethren, and the withering of the fig tree (Matthew 21:18-22) (Note: Matthew 21:18–22) (6 days)
- Great and Holy Tuesday: Parable of the Ten Virgins (5 days)
- Great and Holy Wednesday: Anointing of Jesus with myrrh by Mary of Bethany (Sister of Lazarus and Martha) in the house of Simon the Leper in Bethany; also, the Holy Unction (4 days)
- Great and Holy Thursday: The washing of the disciples' feet, the institution of the Holy Eucharist, the "Marvelous Prayer", and the betrayal by Judas Iscariot (3 days)
- Great and Holy Friday: The holy, saving and lifegiving Passion of Christ; Joseph of Arimathea (2 days)
- Great and Holy Saturday: The Sepulchre of Christ, his descent into Hades to raise up mankind and defeat the powers of death (last day before Pascha)

== Great and Holy Pascha ==
- The Resurrection of Jesus Christ: very late Saturday night (with the procession starting at midnight)
- Agape Vespers: Proclamation of the Gospel to all the ends of the Earth, symbolized by the reading of the Gospel in various languages from the four corners of the Church building (Sunday afternoon)

== Pentecostarion (Paschaltide) ==
- Bright Week: Week commencing on Pascha (counting Pascha as Day 1 for 8 Days)
- Thomas Sunday (Sunday of Saint Thomas): 2nd Sunday of Pascha (counting Pascha as 1st Sunday)
- The Holy Myrrhbearers: 3rd Sunday of Pascha (counting Pascha as 1st Sunday) (15 days)
- The Paralytic: 4th Sunday after Pascha (22 days) (counting Pascha as 1st Sunday)
- Mid-Pentecost: 4th Wednesday after Pascha (25 days)
- The Samaritan Woman (Photini): 5th Sunday of Pascha (29 days) (counting Pascha as 1st Sunday)
- 'The Blind Man 6th Sunday of Pascha (36 days) (counting Pascha as 1st Sunday)
- The Leave-Taking (Apodosis) of Pascha (39 Days)
- The Ascension of Jesus Christ (40 days)
- The Fathers of the First Ecumenical Council: 7th Sunday of Pascha (43 days) (counting Pascha as 1st Sunday)
- Pentecost, when the Holy Spirit descended on the Apostles: 7th Sunday after Pascha (50 days)
- All Saints: 8th Sunday of Pascha (57 days)

== Gallery of icons of the Paschal cycle ==
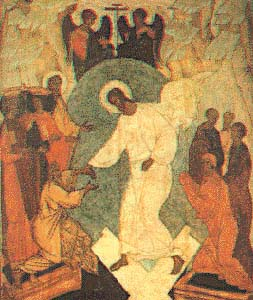
16th century Russian Orthodox icon of the Resurrection of Jesus Christ

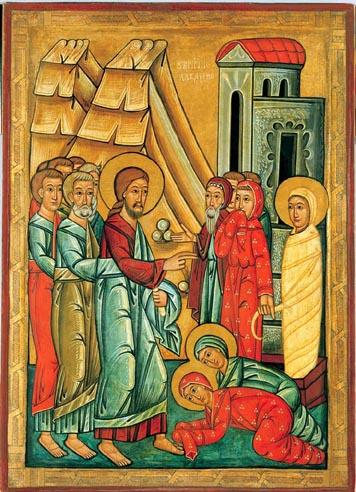
Icon of Lazarus Saturday

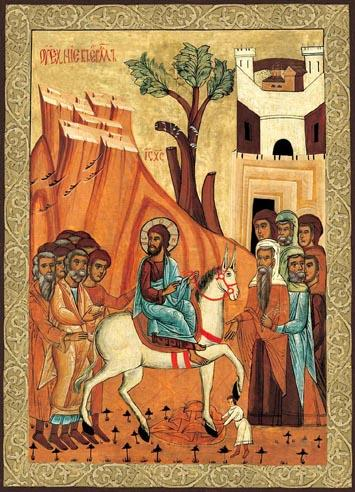
Icon of Palm Sunday

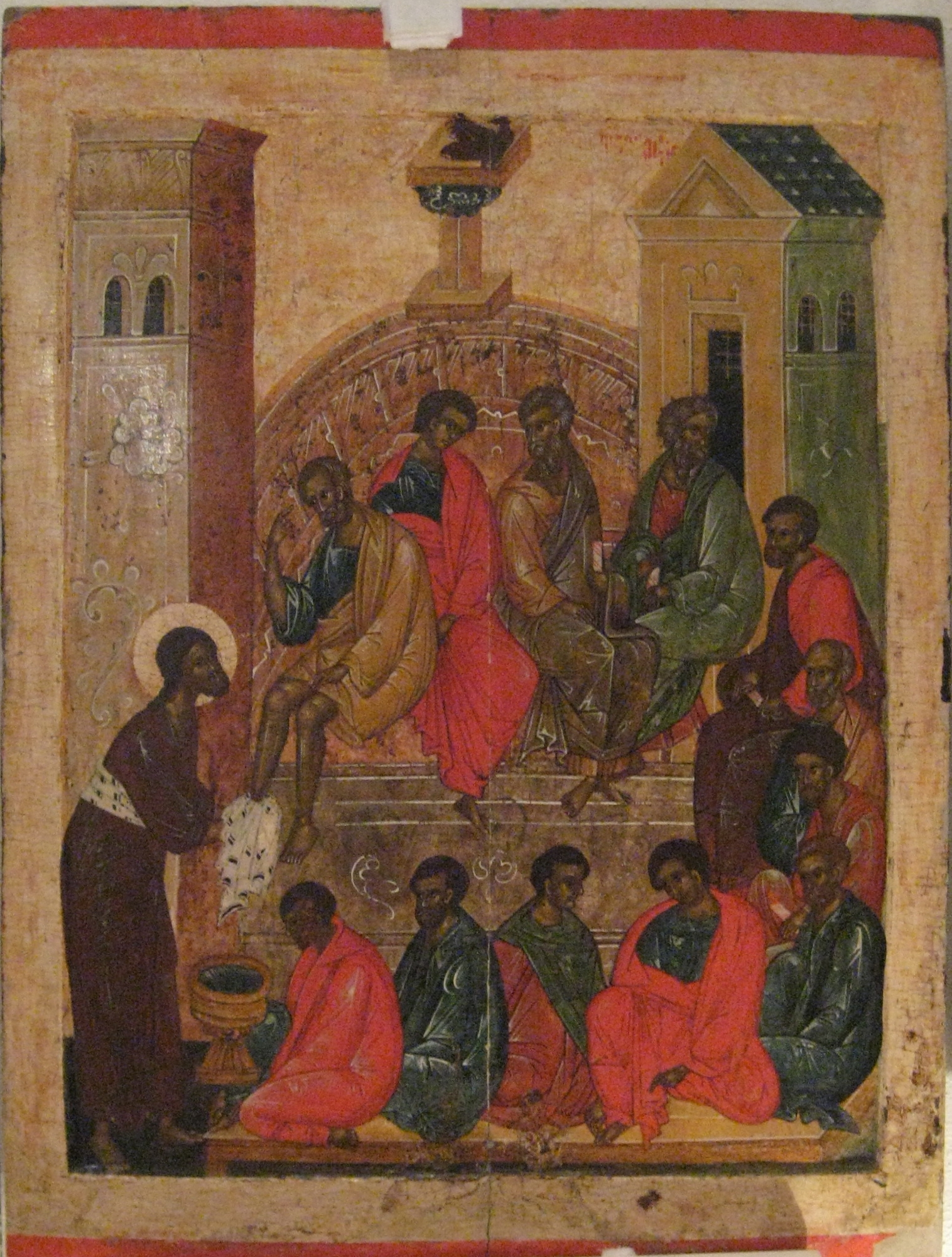
Icon of Christ washing the feet of the Apostles (16th century, Pskov school of iconography)

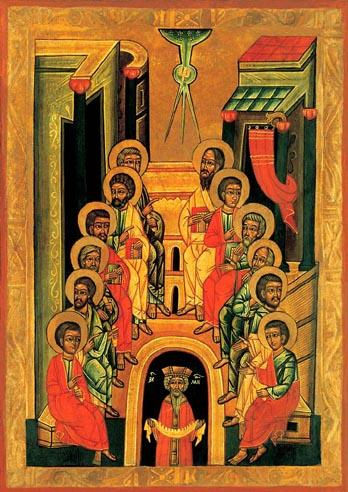
Icon of Pentecost

== See also ==
- List of movable Eastern Christian observances
