= Pentecostarion =

Liturgical book in Eastern Christianity

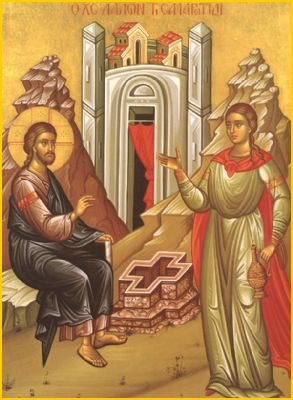
Icon of the Fifth Sunday of Pascha, commemorating the Samaritan woman (Photina), meeting Jesus by the well. Note that the well is cross-shaped; most of the Sundays of the Pentecostarion deal with the subject of water, a reference to Baptism.

The Pentecostarion (Greek: Πεντηκοστάριον, Pentekostárion; Church Slavonic: Цвѣтнаѧ Трїωдь, Tsvyetnaya Triod, literally "Flowery Triodon"; Romanian: Penticostar) is the liturgical book used by the Eastern Orthodox and Byzantine Catholic churches that includes the texts for the Paschal Season, but varies in exact span between different traditions.

The name means the Book of the "Fifty Days", referring to the period of time from Pascha to Pentecost. In Greek, it is also sometimes called the Joyful Pentecostarion (Πεντηκοστάριον χαρμόσυνον, Pentekostárion Charmósynon). In English, it is sometimes called the Paschal Triodion. The name "Pentecostarion" is also applied to the liturgical season covered by the book.

The Pentecostarion is part of the Paschal cycle or "Moveable Cycle" of the ecclesiastical year. This cycle is dependent upon the date of Pascha and continued throughout the coming year until the next Pascha.

Pascha (Easter) is the most important feast of the entire year, outranking by far all others. Each week of the Pentecostarion is named after the Gospel lesson which is read on the Sunday which begins it; for instance, the week that follows Thomas Sunday is referred to as Thomas Week. During the liturgical season of the Pentecostarion, the Gospel of John is read in full, as is the Acts of the Apostles. Both of these books were chosen because of their instructive content. Pascha (Easter) is the traditional time for baptizing new converts to the faith. So, just as Great Lent, with its liturgical book, the Triodion, was the final period of preparation for the catechumens before their baptism, so the time of the Pentecostarion is the time of initiation into the Sacred Mysteries of the Christian religion for the "Newly Illumined" (i.e., the newly baptized).

The two Sacred Mysteries of baptism and chrismation are reflected in the two feasts which mark the beginning and ending points of the Pentecostarion: Pascha and Pentecost. Baptism is naturally tied to the Resurrection, according to the Apostle Paul. (Note: Romans 6:, 1 Corinthians 15:4, Colossians 2:12) Chrismation, the reception of the Gifts of the Holy Spirit is naturally reflected in Pentecost. Because of this, the imagery of water figures prominently in the hymns of the Pentecostarion.

== Content ==
Different uses of Byzantine rite include slightly different material in the Pentecostarion.

In the editions of the Pentecostarion used by the Old Believers and by Eastern Catholic Churches who follow the Ruthenian recension (Byzantine Catholics in Eastern Europe and Byzantine Catholic Church in America), the contents of the Pentecostarion begins with Lazarus Saturday and contains the services of Holy Week. The book is often called Floral Triodion in these traditions, as the first Sunday in the book is colloquially referred to as Flowery Sunday.

In most of Eastern Orthodox uses and in Melkite Catholic use, Pentecostarion begins with Easter Matins.

Different traditions also include different feasts after the Feast of all saints: there is usually (but not always) a feast of local saints, but there can be other additions, like the feast of Holy Eucharist in Catholic versions.

== Holy Week, Pascha and its after-feast ==
The services of Holy Week and Pascha are radically different from the services of any other time of the year. Throughout the course of the season, they gradually return to normal (see Canonical hours and Divine Liturgy).

The Afterfeast of Pascha lasts for 40 days, beginning on the Sunday of Pascha and concluding with the Apodosis ("leave-taking") of Pascha on the day before the Ascension of the Lord.

=== Bright Week ===
The seven days beginning on the Sunday of Pascha are referred to as "Bright Week" or "Renewal Week". On these days the services are completely different that the rest of the year. Everything is chanted rather than being simply read. Most of the services are much shorter than usual. Even the Divine Liturgy, which normally has little variation in it, has a number of changes which are particular to the Paschal celebration. The Little Hours are chanted in a special format known as the Paschal Hours. The reading of the Psalter, which normally forms a major portion of all of the Daily Offices, is completely omitted.

In the temple (church building), the Holy Doors on the iconostasis are left open for the entire week, symbolizing the open Tomb of Christ, and the Epitaphion (shroud) is visible on the Holy Table (altar), representing the burial cloths (John 20:6) which, according to Christian tradition, bore witness to the Resurrection of Jesus.

The Paschal Artos (Greek: Áρτος, "leavened loaf") is a loaf of risen bread bearing an icon of the Resurrection on it, which is blessed near the end the Paschal Vigil. It is then placed either near the Icon of Christ on the iconostasis or in the nave of the church. The Artos represents the physical presence of Jesus after his Resurrection, and is venerated by the faithful when they enter or leave the temple as a way of greeting the Resurrected Christ.

At the end of either Matins or the Divine Liturgy, there is often a crucession (procession headed by the cross), during which the Paschal Canon is chanted, and the priest blesses with holy water.

Unique to Vespers and Matins during Bright Week is the use of the singing of the verse of Psalm 68 responsorially with the Paschal Troparion in place of the usual Psalm 104 at Vespers and the Hexapsalms at Matins.

Only on Bright Friday are the Paschal hymns joined to another commemoration, that of the icon of the Theotokos, "Life-giving Spring". On all of the other days of Bright Week, only the Resurrection may be celebrated. Exceptions are made for the feast day of a local patron saint, or for important feast days such as Saint George, which may be combined with the paschal celebration.

If it becomes necessary to celebrate a funeral during Bright Week, even this service is radically different, and follows for the most part the format for Paschal Matins, with only a few funeral hymns being chanted.

=== Thomas Sunday ===
The Sunday which follows Pascha (the Second Sunday of Pascha) is called "Thomas Sunday", because it recounts the appearance of Jesus to the Apostle Thomas eight days after his resurrection. (Note: John 20:19–29)

Thomas Sunday is also called "Antipascha" (literally, "in the place of Pascha") because those who for honorable reason were not able to attend the Paschal Vigil, may attend services on this day instead. In middle Greek, "anti" Pascha also means "enter" Pascha. Pascha is a unique feast in the church year; being the "Feast of Feasts" it follows a format unlike any other day. Those liturgical elements normal to a Great Feast of the Lord which were displaced by Pascha's unique elements are instead chanted on Thomas Sunday.

==== Radonitza ====
Radonitza (Russian: "Day of Rejoicing"), is a day of commemoration of the departed. Because the celebration of any memorial service for the departed is forbidden from Holy Thursday through Thomas Sunday, a popular tradition has arisen of visiting the graves of departed loved ones and chanting memorial services on the first day this is permitted. There are no special hymns appointed in the Pentecostarion for Radonitza, and nothing different is done in the Daily Office. However, after the Divine Liturgy, it is customary for the faithful to visit cemeteries and serve memorial services, and to give alms in the name of the departed. It is not unusual for families to bring a picnic with them to the cemeteries, which would include paschal foods, especially Easter eggs. Some people leave Easter eggs on the graves of their beloved departed as a way of giving the Paschal greeting to the departed, and as a sign of their belief in the resurrection of the dead.

=== Sunday of the Myrrhbearers ===
The Third Sunday of Pascha is dedicated to the 'Myrrhbearing Women' (the Theotokos, Mary Magdalene, and the other women who brought spices to the Tomb of Jesus) and also to Joseph of Arimathea and Nicodemus, who cared for the burial of Jesus after his crucifixion.

The placement of this feast is based upon the idea of the synaxis, wherein secondary persons directly involved in the events celebrated in one of the feasts are celebrated on the day after. However, since Bright Week is devoted exclusively to the celebration of the Resurrection, and Thomas Sunday falls logically on the eighth day of the Resurrection (according to its biblical source), this day becomes the first Sunday on which these persons can be commemorated.

=== Sunday of the Paralytic ===
The Sunday of the Paralytic is the Fourth Sunday of Pascha, and recalls Jesus' healing of the Paralytic, as recounted in the Gospel reading for the day, John 5:1-15. (Note: John 5:1–15) The theme for this Sunday is the man who lay by the Sheep's Pool in Jerusalem for thirty-eight years. The first one to enter the pool after an angel troubled the water would be healed of his infirmities; but because the man was paralyzed, someone else always entered the pool before him. According to the Gospel account, Jesus had pity on the man, seeing he had no one to put him into the pool, and healed him.

The Kontakion for this day asks Christ to raise up the souls of the faithful, "paralyzed by sins and thoughtless acts." The underlying symbolism of the feast is that mankind, being unable to raise itself from the fall by its own will or power, needed "some man" (i.e., the Son of Man, the Messiah) to come and raise it up.

The feast of the Paralytic is unusual in the Pentecostarion in that it does not last a full week, but ends on the day before Mid-Pentecost.

==== Mid-Pentecost ====
The Wednesday following the Sunday of the Paralytic is the Feast of Mid-Pentecost This is a "feast within a feast", and propers of the Resurrection are combined with propers for Mid-Pentecost. The hymns of the feast speak of it drawing together the themes of Pascha and Ascension. The Apodosis (leave-taking) of Mid-Pentecost comes one week later, on the following Wednesday.

=== Sunday of the Samaritan Woman ===
The Sunday of the Samaritan Woman is the Fifth Sunday of Pascha, commemorating the Woman by the well, (traditionally known as Photina in Greek or Svetlana in Russian), as recounted in the Gospel reading for the day, John 4:5-42. (Note: John 4:5–42) Like the Paralytic, the Samaritan Woman is commemorated only on Sunday and half the week (in this case, the second half), the first half of the week being dedicated to the afterfeast of Mid-Pentecost.

=== Sunday of the Blind Man ===
The Sixth Sunday of Pascha is the Sunday of the Blind Man, commemorating Jesus' healing of the man born blind in John 9:1-48, (Note: John 9:1–38) recounted in the Gospel lesson for this day's Divine Liturgy.

The Pentecostarion's theme of water is continued by the fact that Jesus sent the man to wash the clay from his eyes in the Pool of Siloam (the name 'Siloam' is interpreted as "sent", implying that the blind man's cure was bestowed for his obedience to Jesus).

The miracle of the blind man (traditionally named Celidonius) is remarkable in two respects: firstly, that although there are other accounts in both the Old Testament and the New of the blind having their sight restored, this is the only time someone born blind was given sight for the first time. Although the biblical text does not explicitly say so, the hymns in the Pentecostarion follow the traditional interpretation that not only was this man born without sight, he was born even without eyes. Jesus' act of making clay is an act of creation (creating eyes where none were before), a repetition of the first act of the creation of man in Genesis 2:7. (Note: Genesis 2:7) This indicates the traditional Christian teaching that in the act of salvation Jesus makes his disciples a "new creation". (Note: 2 Corinthians 5:17)

The second remarkable aspect of the miracle is that not only did Jesus give the man physical sight, but he bestowed upon him spiritual sight as well. In the blind man's dialogue with the Pharisees, he holds his own in the dispute, engaging in reasoned theological discourse as though he were educated.

These three Sundays of the Paralytic, of the Samaritian Woman and of the Blind Man are characterized by their reference to the Sacrament of Baptism, each illustrating a different dimension or aspect of the Sacrament.

==== Apodosis of Pascha ====
The Week of the Blindman is the last week in the Afterfeast of Pascha, and the Apodosis of Pascha is the final day of the Paschal celebration. There are currently two different practices with regard to the celebration of the Apodosis of Pascha. According to the older practice, hymns of the Resurrection are chanted together with those for the Aposdosis of the Blind Man on Wednesday. According to the more modern practice in the Greek Orthodox Church (those following the "Typicon of the Great Church") the Apodosis of the Blind Man is chanted on Tuesday, while all of the services of Wednesday (Vespers on Tuesday evening; Matins, Little Hours and Divine Liturgy on Wednesday morning) are chanted in the special Paschal form that was used during Bright Week.

== Ascension ==
The Great Feast of the Ascension falls on the 40th day after Pascha (inclusive), always on a Thursday. The feast is celebrated with an All-Night Vigil starting on Wednesday evening. The Epitaphion (shroud), which had been on the Holy Table since the Paschal Vigil, is removed before the beginning of this service as an indication that the Ascension marked the end of Jesus' physical presence with his disciples after the Resurrection. The Afterfeast of Ascension lasts for eight days until the Apodosis on the following Friday.

=== Sunday of the Holy Fathers ===
The Seventh Sunday of Pascha, which falls during the Afterfeast of the Ascension, commemorates the Holy Fathers of the First Ecumenical Council (325 AD). In addition to defending Christianity against Arianism, the council also passed a number of canons concerning church discipline, and also decreed that the date for celebrating Pascha both be reckoned independently from the Jewish Passover and be uniform throughout the world.

The hymns and readings in the Pentecostarion are very rich in drawing out relevant symbolism from biblical texts. The Epistle for the Divine Liturgy is from Acts 20:16-18 (Note: Acts 20:16–18) and Acts 20:28-36. (Note: Acts 20:28–36) The Gospel is from John 17:1-13. (Note: John 17:1–13)

=== Saturday of the Dead ===
The Seventh Saturday of Pascha, the day before Pentecost, is a Saturday of the Dead, on which the church commemorates all of the faithful departed "who in ages past have reposed in a godly manner, in hope of the resurrection of eternal life." Two Epistles (Acts 28:1-31, (Note: Acts 28:1–31) 1 Thessalonians 4:13-17 (Note: 1 Thessalonians 4:13–17)) and two Gospels (John 21:14-25, (Note: John 21:14–25) John 5:24-30 (Note: John 5:24–30)) are appointed to be read at the Divine Liturgy. On this day, the readings from Acts and the Gospel of St. John, which began on Pascha, are concluded. Traditionally, St. John Chrysostom's homily "On Patience and Gratitude" is appointed to be read in church (the same homily is also appointed for funerals).

Since the Apodosis of the Ascension fell on the previous day, there are no hymns appointed for this day which speak of either the Ascension or of Pentecost. Instead, the hymns are devoted to prayer for the dead. The prokeimenon at Vespers and God is the Lord at Matins are replaced by Alleluia, and a number of structural changes are made to the services following the pattern of the Saturdays of the Dead which fall during Great Lent. A general Panikhida (memorial service) is served either after Vespers or after the Divine Liturgy, and the Ektenia (litany) for the Departed is chanted at the Liturgy.

== Pentecost ==
Pentecost is the second most important feast of the church year, second in importance only to Pascha itself. The Great Feast lasts for seven days, with its Apodosis falling on the following Saturday.

It is celebrated with an All-Night Vigil on the Eve of the Feast and Divine Liturgy on the day of the Feast. An extraordinary service called the Kneeling Prayer, is served on the night of Pentecost. This is a Vespers service to which are added three sets of long poetical prayers, the composition of Saint Basil the Great, during which everyone makes a full prostration, touching their foreheads to the floor (prostrations in church having been forbidden from the day of Pascha up to this point).

The churches are decorated with greenery, and among the Russians the clergy and faithful carry flowers and green branches in their hands during the services. Pentecost is a traditional time for baptisms. The week prior to the feast is known as "green week", during which all manner of plants and herbs are gathered. The Sunday of Pentecost is called "Trinity Sunday," the next day is called "Monday of the Holy Spirit", and Tuesday of Pentecost week is called the "Third Day of the Trinity." The whole week following Pentecost is an important ecclesiastical feast, and is a fast-free week, during which meat and dairy products may be eaten, even on Wednesday and Friday.

Theologically, the Orthodox do not consider Pentecost to be the "birthday" of the Church; they see the Church as having existed before the creation of the world (cf. The Shepherd of Hermas). The Orthodox icon of the feast depicts the Twelve Apostles seated in a semicircle (sometimes the Theotokos (Virgin Mary) is shown sitting in the center of them). At the top of the icon, the Holy Spirit, in the form of tongues of fire, is descending upon them. At the bottom is an allegorical figure, called Kosmos, which symbolizes the world. Although Kosmos is crowned with glory he sits in the darkness caused by the ignorance of God. He is holding a towel on which have been placed 12 scrolls, representing the teaching of the Twelve Apostles.

=== Day of the Holy Spirit ===
The Monday of the Holy Spirit, also called Whit Monday or Pentecost Monday, falls on the day after Pentecost Sunday. This day commemorates the Holy Spirit's role in the feast of Pentecost. Churches named after the Holy Spirit and, in Western Christianity, those named after the Holy Trinity, commemorate their feast on this day (In Eastern Christianity, churches named after the Holy Trinity, commemorate their feast on Pentecost Sunday).

== All Saints Sunday ==
The First Sunday After Pentecost is dedicated to the commemoration of All Saints.

The next day (Monday) is the beginning of the Apostles' Fast. This is a unique fast in that it is of variable duration, beginning on the moveable calendar, but ending on the fixed calendar feast day of the Apostles Peter and Paul on June 29 (for those churches which follow the Julian Calendar June 29 falls on July 12 of the modern Gregorian Calendar). While all of the Orthodox Churches celebrate Pascha on the same day (with the exception of the Finnish Orthodox Church, which follows the Western Paschalion), some churches follow the traditional Julian Calendar ("Old Calendar") and some follow the Revised Julian Calendar ("New Calendar") which uses the modern Gregorian Calendar to calculate their fixed feasts. Since there is currently a difference of thirteen days between the two calendars, the Apostles' Fast will be almost two weeks shorter for New Calendar churches, or in some years non-existent.

== All Saints of Local Church ==
All-Saints of Local Commemoration. This will differ from one national church to another. For instance, in Romania, the commemoration will be "All Saints of Romania", on Mount Athos the commemoration will be "All Saints of the Holy Mountain", etc. In the Orthodox Church of America, the commemoration is "All Saints of America".

== See also ==
- Paschal cycle
- Triodion — the Lenten Triodion, for services of the moveable cycle prior to the Pentecostarion
