= Office of the Souls of Purgatory =

Catholic devotion of Portuguese origin

The Office of the Souls in Purgatory, also known as the Office of the Souls or Office of the Blessed Souls, is an ancient Catholic devotion of Portuguese origin, intended to intercede for the souls who, according to Catholic doctrine, undergo purification in Purgatory before attaining the beatific vision of God.

== Origin and history ==
The devotion likely dates back to the 17th or 18th century, developing from medieval practices of suffrage for the dead. After the Council of Trent (1545–1563), which reaffirmed the doctrine of Purgatory, various prayers and offices dedicated to the “blessed souls” emerged.

In Portugal, these practices were gathered into popular forms of communal prayer, transmitted orally and later brought to Brazil through confraternities and religious brotherhoods dedicated to the faithful departed.

In Brazil, the Office of the Souls became a particularly vibrant tradition in the Northeast and Center-West regions, where it is sung during pilgrimages, novenas, and gatherings of confraternities. The practice preserves a strong communal and devotional character, maintaining elements of Luso-Brazilian popular religiosity.

== Structure and content ==
The Office of the Souls consists of hymns, prayers, and meditative verses that invoke divine mercy on behalf of the suffering souls. In many popular versions, the office is recited on Mondays or during the month of November, traditionally dedicated to the Faithful Departed.

== See also ==
- Prayers for the dead
