= Radonitsa =

Russian Orthodox commemoration of the departed

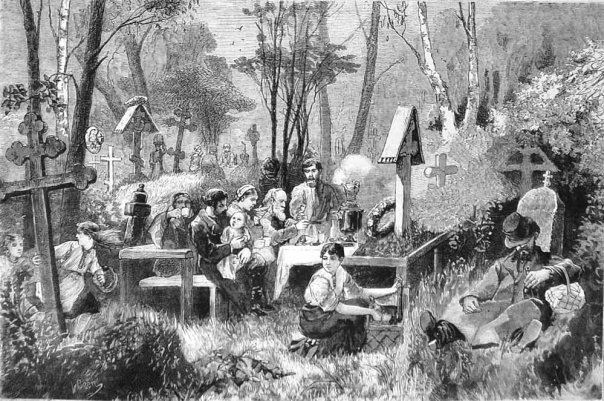
- Wake in the cemetery
- Observed by: Russian, Belarusian, and Ukrainian communities worldwide
- Frequency: annual

Radonitsa (Russian: Ра́доница, Belarusian: Ра́даўніца "Day of Rejoicing"), also spelled Radunitsa, Radonica, or Radunica, in the Russian Orthodox Church is a commemoration of the departed observed on the second Tuesday of Pascha (Easter) or, in some places (in south-west Russia), on the second Monday of Pascha. In the Ukrainian tradition it is called Provody (Ukrainian: Прóводи).

== History and meaning ==
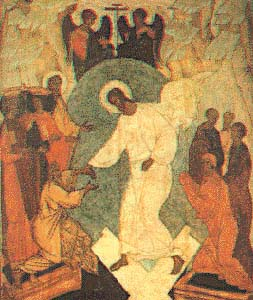
Russian Orthodox Icon of the Harrowing of Hell and raising up of Adam (16th century).

The Slavs, like many ancient peoples, had a tradition of visiting family members' graves during the springtime and feasting together with them. After their conversion to Christianity, this custom transferred into the Russian Orthodox Church as the festival of Radonitsa, the name of which comes from the Slavic word "radost'", meaning "joy". In Russia a local name is "Krasnaya Gorka" (Кра́сная го́рка, translated as "Red Hill"; or more archaically, "Beautiful Hill"), and has the same meaning. In Serbia, the day is called "Pobusani ponedeonik" (Побусани понедеоник) i.e. "The Tomb-Sweeping Monday". The word "ponedeonik" is a more archaic form, the standard form for Monday in modern Serbian is "ponedeljak".

It may seem strange to call a memorial for the departed "joyful", but the Christian belief that lies behind this joy is the remembrance of Jesus' Resurrection and the joy and hope it brings to all.

Because of the importance of the last few days of Holy Week, and because of the joy of the Resurrection, the Typikon (Ustav) forbids, as in other festal periods, special prayers for the departed, e.g. a Panikhida, (except for funerals, which, obviously, cannot be postponed) from Great and Holy Thursday through Thomas Sunday (a period of eleven days). Therefore, the first opportunity after Pascha to remember the dead is on the second Monday of Pascha. However, because in Orthodox countries, a number of monasteries follow the custom of fasting on Mondays, the feast is often celebrated on Tuesday, so that all may partake of eggs.

== Ancient tradition ==
The practice of greeting the dead with the Resurrection is not merely a "baptism" of pagan practices, but has antecedents in the ancient Church. S. V. Bulgakov records the following:

The commemoration of the departed after Pascha was also done in extreme antiquity. St. Ambrose of Milan (340 – 397) says in one of his sermons: "It is truly meet and right, brethren, that after the celebration of Pascha, which we have celebrated, to share our joy with the holy martyrs and by them as participants in the suffering of the Lord, to announce the glory of the resurrection of the Lord". Although these words of St. Ambrose relate to martyrs, they may be an indication of our custom to commemorate the departed after Pascha on Monday or Tuesday of Thomas Week because the beginning of the solemn commemorations in the faith of those who died is established in the New Testament Church as a pious custom to the memory of the martyrs, [both] among the martyrs buried in antiquity and the others who have died.

St. John Chrysostom (349 - 407) also bears testimony that in his day they celebrated a joyful commemoration of the departed on Tuesday of Saint Thomas Week in his Homily on the Cemetery and the Cross.

== Practices ==
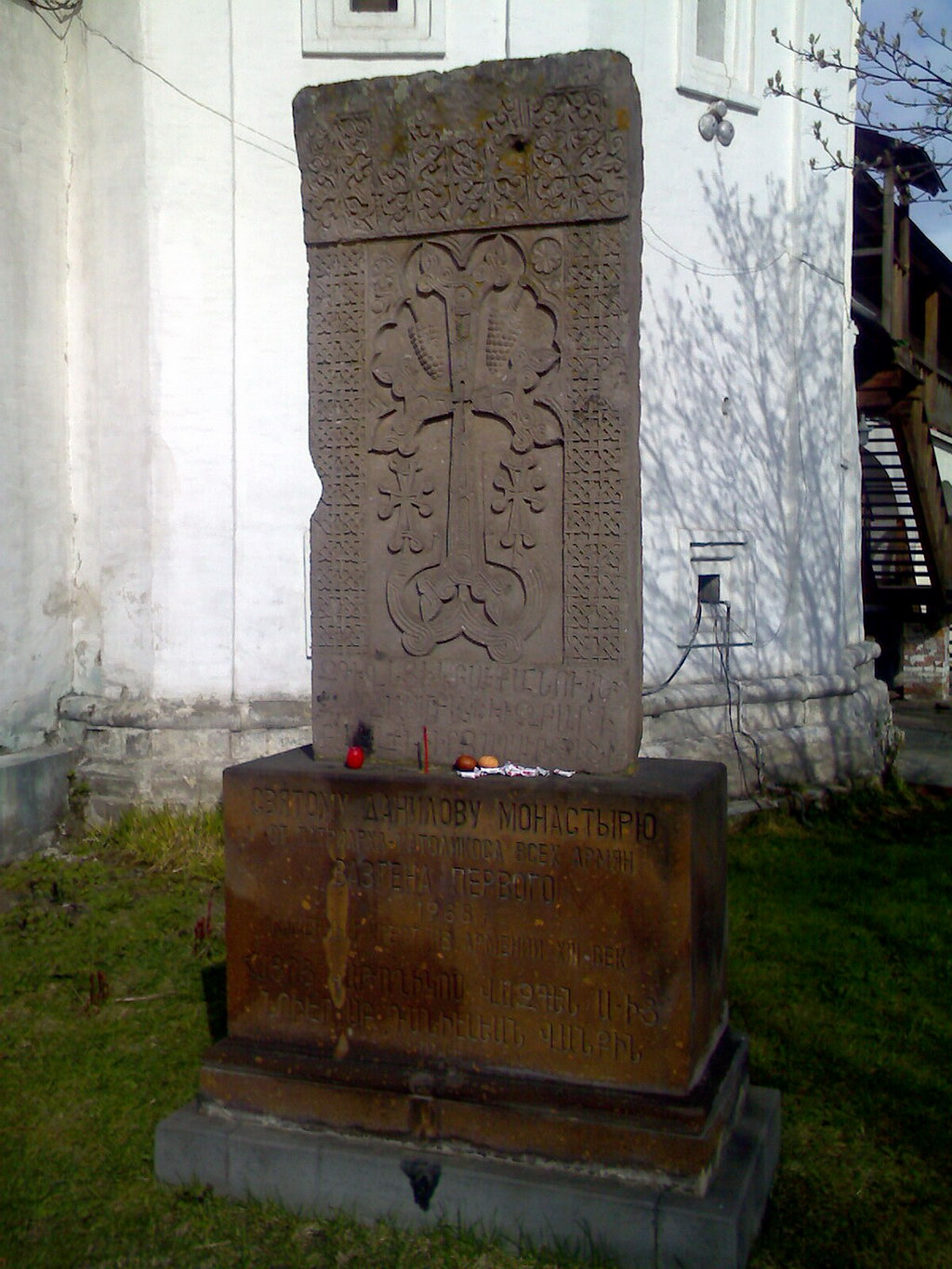
Candles and easter eggs left on a grave at Danilov monastery, Moscow.

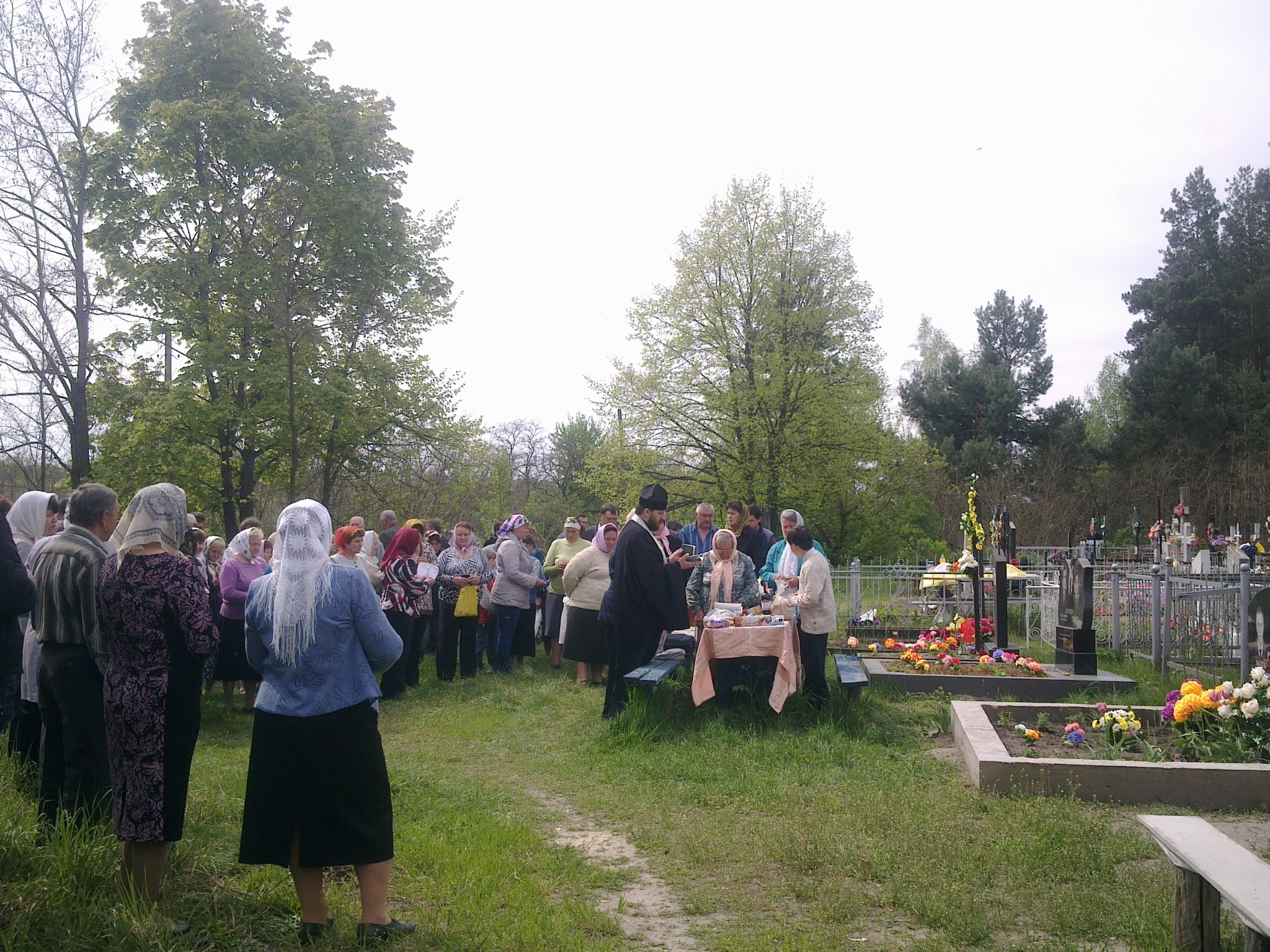
Provody or pomynky (Ukrainian names of Radonitsa) in Ukraine

Although the Typikon does not prescribe any special prayers for the departed on these days, the memorial is kept as a pious custom. Unlike the various Soul Saturdays throughout the year, there are no changes made to Vespers, Matins or the Divine Liturgy, to reflect this being a day of the dead.

On this day, after Divine Liturgy, the priest will celebrate a Panikhida in the church, after which he will bless the paschal foods that the faithful have brought with them. The clergy, with incense and candles, will then go in procession with the cross, followed by the faithful, to visit the graves of departed believers either in churchyards or in cemeteries. At the graves, paschal hymns are chanted together with the usual litanies for the departed, concluding with the moving "Memory Eternal" (Вѣчнаѧ памѧть,Viechnaia pamiat).

The paschal foods will then be consumed with joy by the friends and relatives of the deceased. It is common to place an Easter egg, a symbol of Christ's coming forth from the Tomb, on the graves of the departed, saluting them with the traditional paschal greeting: "Christ is Risen!" This practice is both to remind the faithful of the General Resurrection of the dead, and to "announce the Resurrection" of Christ to the departed.

== Customs ==
Among the traditions that have grown up around Radonitsa, the following are noteworthy:

- Foods traditionally eaten at Radonitsa are: funeral koliva, dyed eggs, kulichi, pancakes, dracheni, honey prianiki, and cookies.
- Radonitsa begins the marriage season. Since weddings are forbidden during the Great Lenten Fast (because that time should be devoted to penance and self-examination, rather than merrymaking), as well as during Bright Week (because at that time we commemorate nothing else except the Resurrection), with Radonitsa comes the time for weddings.
- Men and women traditionally give gifts to their in-laws (more kindly known as "God-given" family members), at Radonitsa, so that joy may be in every house.

== See also ==
- Dziady
- Koliva
- Lemuria
- Panikhida
- Paschal cycle
- Prayer for the Dead
