= Koliva =

Ritual food

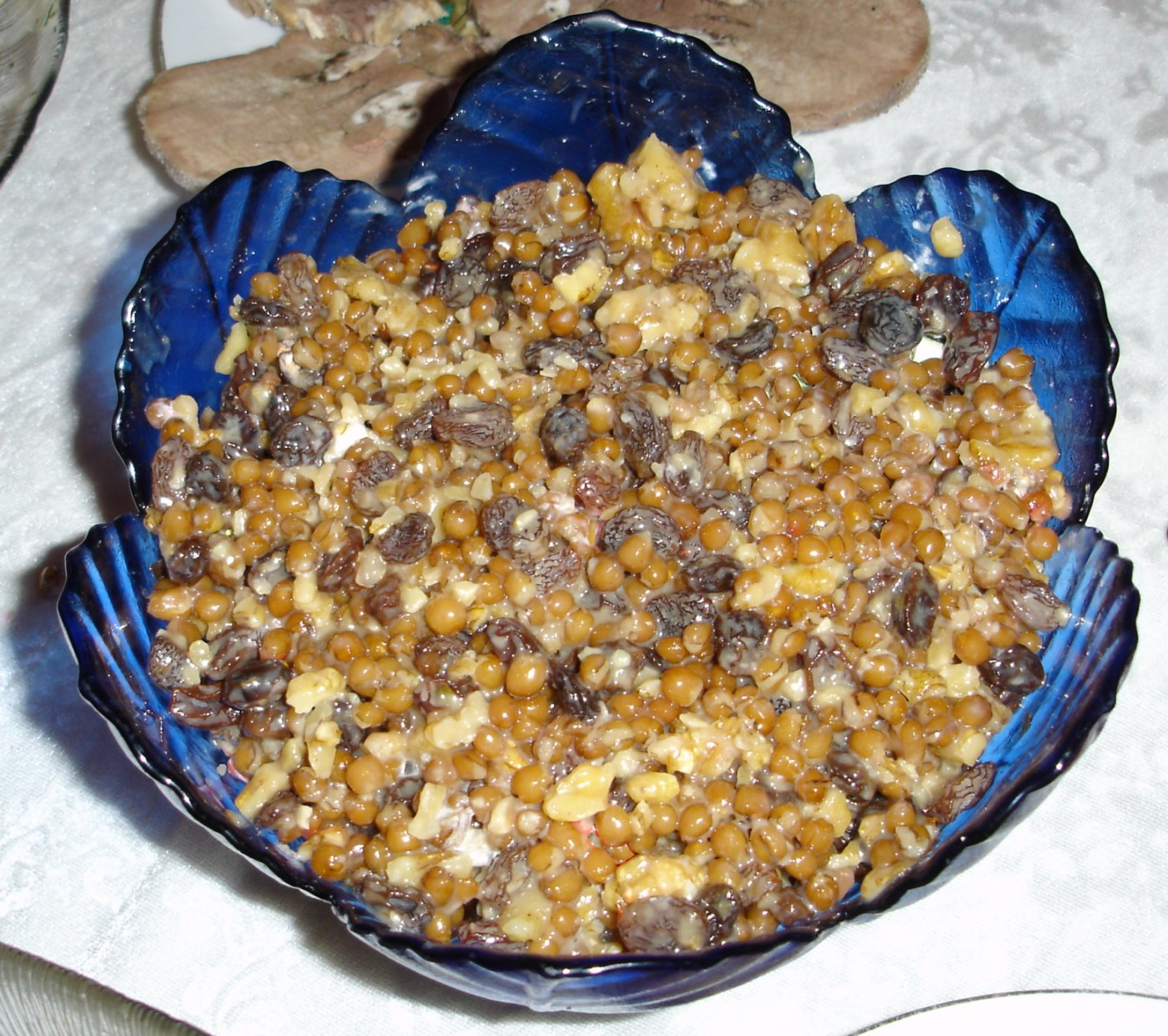
- Koliva from wheat seeds with raisins
- Alternative names: Kollyva, Colivă, Funeral Cake (In the Arab world: Bleeleh, Sleeqa, Rahmeh)
- Type: Ritual food
- Main ingredients: Wheat kernels, honey or sugar

Koliva, also spelled, depending on the language, kollyva, kollyba, kolyvo, or colivă, (Note: There are many variations of the name in the languages of Eastern Europe and the Mediterranean region. Greek: κόλλυβα (pronounced [ˈkoliva]), Cypriot Greek: κόλλυφα, “kollifa”, Serbian: кољиво, koljivo (also interchangeably called жито, žito), Romanian: colivă, Bulgarian: коливо, kolivo, Georgian: კოლიო, kolio (also interchangeably called კორკოტი, korkoti and წანდილი, tsandili), Ukrainian: коливо, kolyvo.) is a dish based on boiled wheat that is used liturgically in the Eastern Orthodox Church for commemorations of the dead.

In the Eastern Orthodox Church, Koliva is blessed during funerals, as well as during the memorial service (mnemosyno) that is performed at various intervals after a person's death and on special occasions, such as the Saturday of Souls (ψυχοσάββατο, Psychosavvato). It may also be used on first Friday of the Great Lent, at Slavas, or at mnemosyna in the Christmas meal. In some countries, though not in Greece (and Cyprus), it is consumed on nonreligious occasions as well.

Across the Christian Arab world, wheat berries are similarly prepared for funeral masses. They are boiled, then dried and topped with powdered sugar and occasionally garnished with almonds and candies as well. It is referred to by different names depending on region such as bleeleh, sleeqah, or rahmeh. Across the Levant, wheatberries are also prepared for festive occasions but then called by a different name (snuniye for a baby's first tooth or burbara when it is prepared for Saint Barbara's feast day, December 4.)

In Ethiopia also similar food is popular specially with the Orthodox Christian community, it is called "Nifro". Nifro is a boiled grain snack commonly enjoyed in Ethiopia, typically made from a mix of grains and legumes such as wheat, barley, and chickpeas. It is often seasoned simply with salt and sometimes accompanied by roasted grains or nuts. This nutritious snack is popular during holidays and special occasions, such as funerals.

== Etymology ==
Kollyba, a word which in Greek is the plural form of kollybo (κόλλυβο: n neu; itself rarely used), is derived from the Ancient Greek word κόλλυβος, kollybos (n masc), i.e. a small coin or a small gold weight. In the Hellenistic period, the neuter plural form of the latter word, i.e. κόλλυβα, kollyba, took the meaning of small pies made of boiled wheat. The sense of the ritual food is of a latter period. In Serbian it is called Koljivo (Кољиво), Кутя in Bulgarian, Colivă in Romanian, კოლიო (kolio) in Georgian, Коливо in Ukrainian, Gollifa in Turkish, and in Albanian, it is called Grurë (lit. “Wheat”).

== Recipe ==
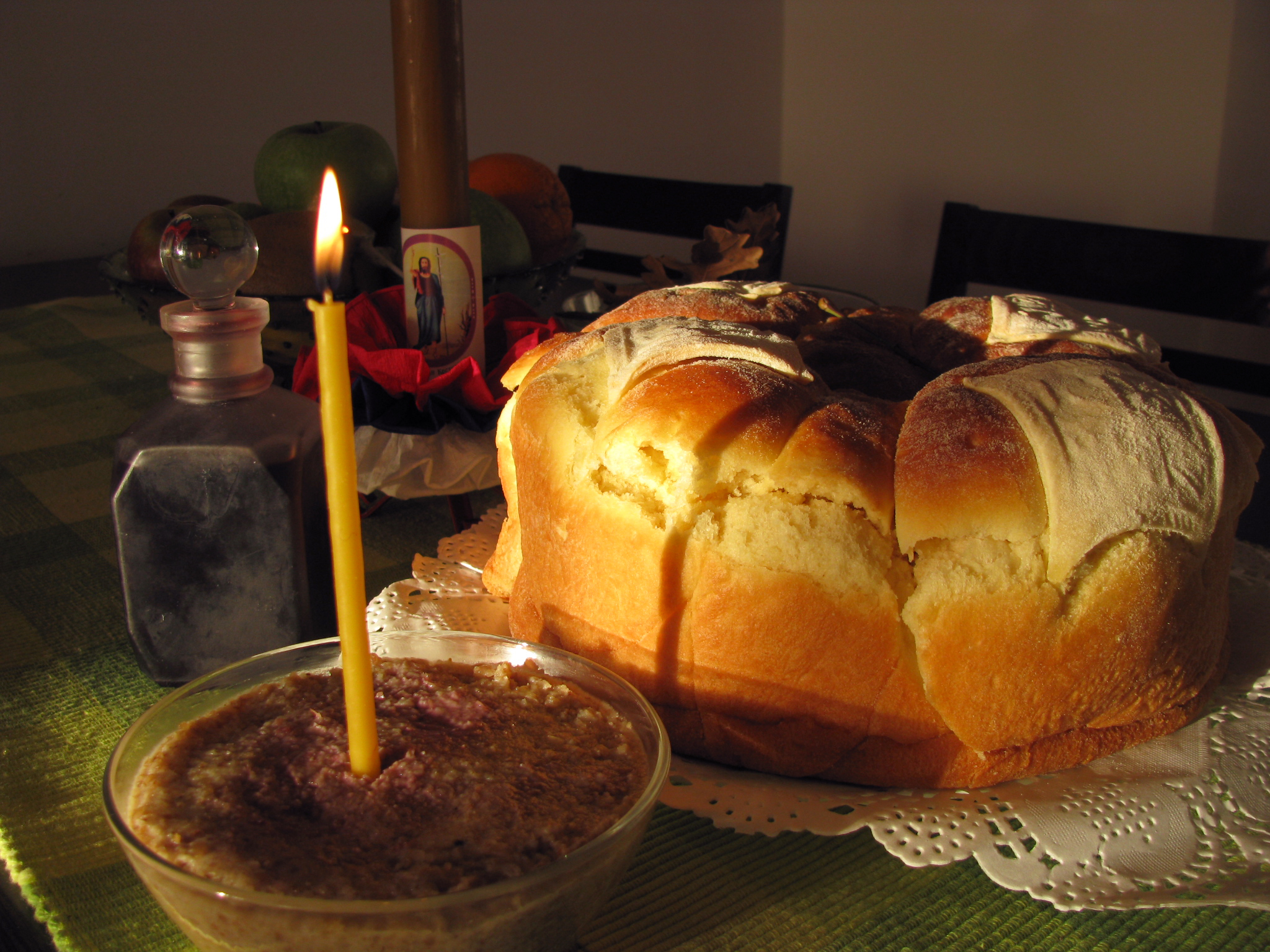
A bowl of koliva, with lit candle, as part of a Serbian family feast (slava) in honor of their Patron Saint.

While recipes may vary widely, the primary ingredient is wheat kernels which have been boiled until they are soft, they are drained very well and spread on a cloth to be just moist, and then sweetened with honey or sugar. Koliva also contains some or all of the following: wheat, sesame seeds, almonds, ground walnuts, cinnamon, sugar, pomegranate seeds, raisins, anise and parsley. Romanians decorate the koliva with crosses of cocoa, chocolate or candy.

The practice of offering koliva is traditional in Greece, Cyprus, Serbia, North Macedonia, Bulgaria, Montenegro, Ukraine, Belarus, Romania, Moldova, Russia and parts of Bosnia-Herzegovina, and among Orthodox Christians in the Middle East. When served, the koliva mixture, which looks like earth, is shaped into a mound to resemble a grave. The whole is then covered with powdered sugar and the initials of the deceased are outlined on the top. A candle, usually placed in the center of the koliva, is lit at the beginning of the memorial service and extinguished at its end. After the liturgy, those attending share in eating the koliva as they speak of the deceased and say, "May God forgive him/her."

Some Orthodox parishes have a designated individual charged with making the koliva. This is, in part, due to the health risk of fermented wheat if the koliva is not prepared correctly.

Sometimes koliva is made with rice or barley instead of wheat. This custom began as a practical response to a famine that occurred in Soviet Russia, when the faithful did not have wheat available for koliva, so they used rice instead. Some communities continue to use rice for their koliva up to this day. In the Japanese Orthodox Church where rice is mainly eaten, koliva is commonly made from rice sweetened with sugar and decorated with raisins, without reference to famine.

== History ==
The origins of koliva predate Christianity. The word koliva itself stems from the Ancient Greek word κόλλυβoς (kollybos), which originally meant "a small coin" and later in the neuter plural form "small pies made of boiled wheat". In the Ancient Greek panspermia, a mixture of cooked seeds and nuts were offered during the pagan festival of the Anthesteria.

In the 5th century AD koliva in the sense of boiled wheat, constituted along with raw vegetables the diet of monks who refused to eat bread. The 12th century canonist Theodore Balsamon maintained that koliva as a ritual food practice was originated by Athanasius of Alexandria during the reign of the Emperor Julian the Apostate.

The association between death and life, between that which is planted in the ground and that which emerges, is deeply embedded in the making and eating of koliva. The ritual food passed from paganism to early Christianity in Byzantium and later spread to the entire Orthodox world.

== Occasions of use ==
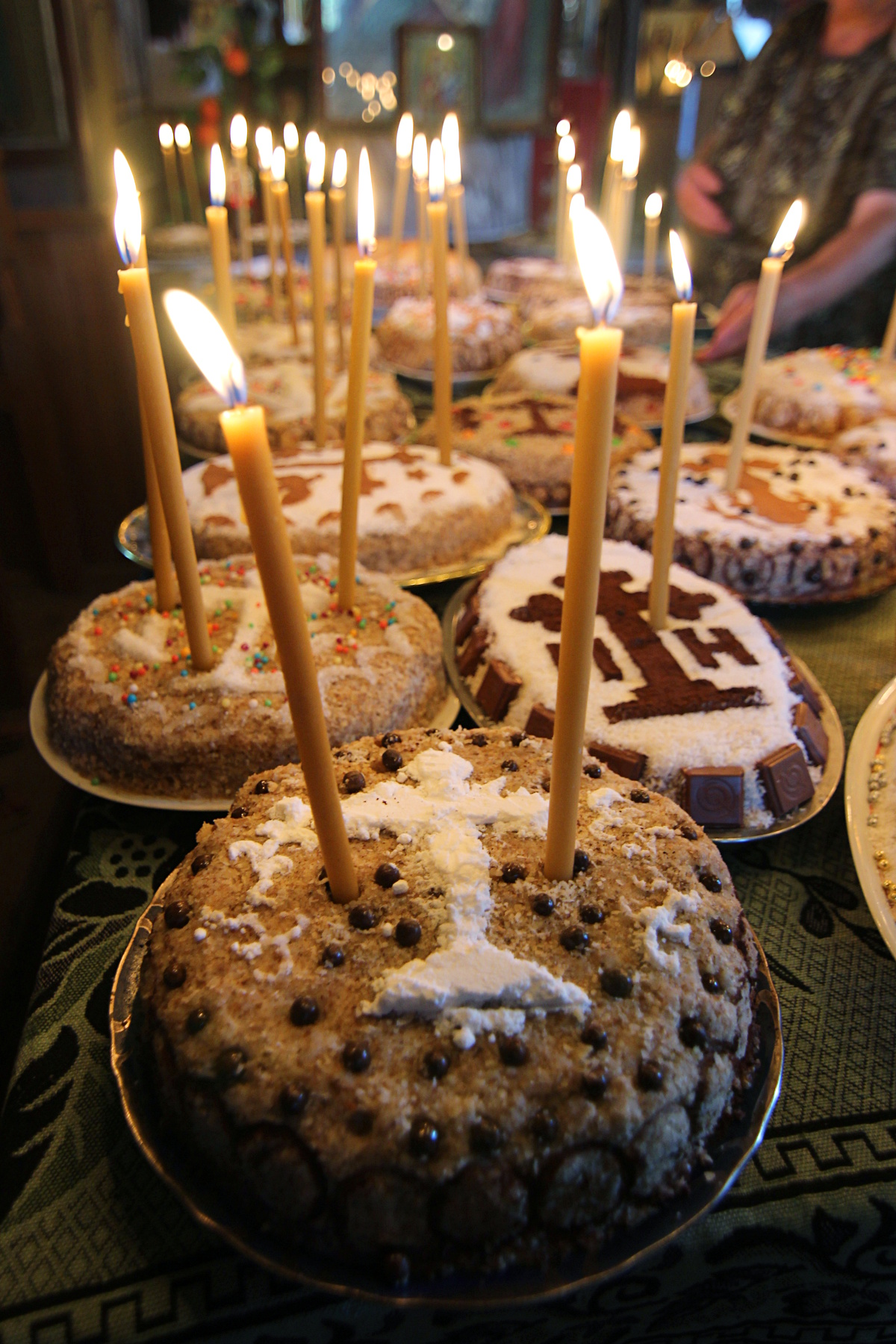
Romanian colivă used in a religious ceremony in a Christian Orthodox church

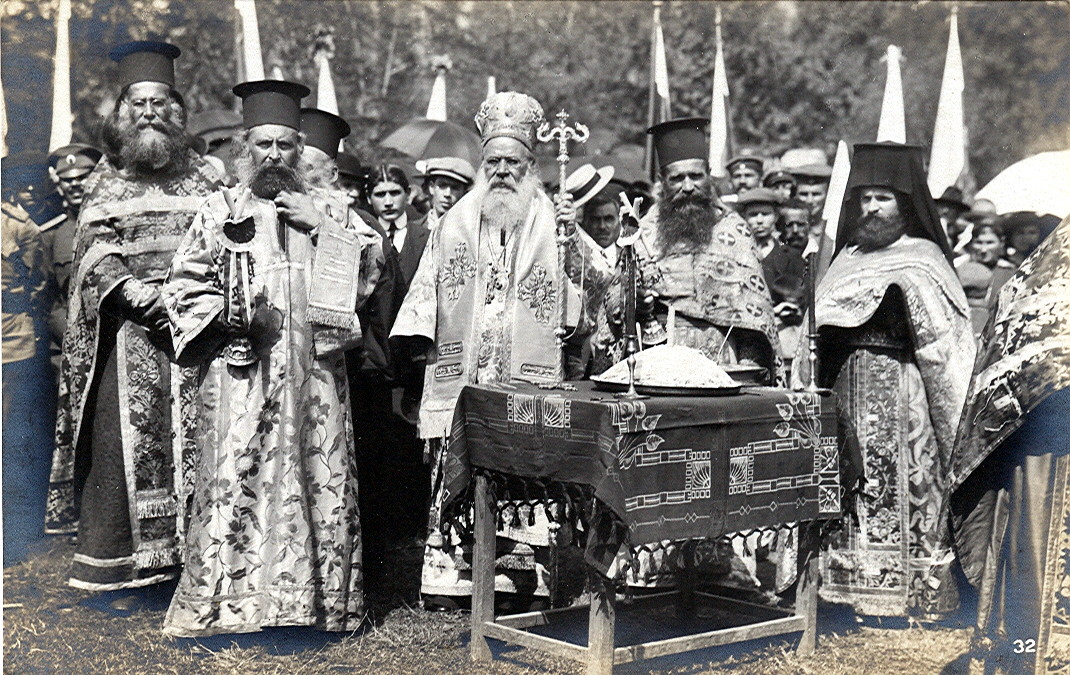
Postcard, undated (ca.1916), showing an Orthodox service with the blessing of koliva.

Koliva is used on a number of different occasions:

=== St Theodore Saturday ===
The tradition of blessing and eating koliva at the end of the first week of Great Lent is connected with an event in the reign of Julian the Apostate. The tradition states that the Emperor knew that the Christians would be hungry after the first week of strict fasting, and would go to the marketplaces of Constantinople on Saturday to buy food. So he ordered that blood from pagan sacrifices be sprinkled over all the food that was sold there. This made the food unsuitable as Lenten fare (since the Christians could not eat meat products during Lent), and in general as food for Christians, who are forbidden to eat food from such sacrifices. However, St. Theodore Tyro appeared in a dream to Archbishop Eudoxius and advised him that the people should not eat food bought at the marketplace that day, but only boiled wheat mixed with honey. As a result, this first Saturday of Great Lent has come to be known as Theodore Saturday.

=== Memorial services ===
During requiem services (Greek: mnemósynon, Slavonic: Panikhida, Romanian: parastas), the family or friends of the departed will often prepare koliva which are placed in front of the memorial table before which the service is chanted.

Memorial services are held on the third, ninth, and fortieth days after the repose of an Orthodox Christian, as well as on the one-year anniversary. In addition, there are several Soul Saturdays during the church year (mostly during Great Lent), as well as Radonitsa (on the second Tuesday after Pascha), on each of which general commemorations are made for all the departed.

=== Funerals ===
During the Greek, Romanian, Serbian, Macedonian, Bulgarian, and Ukrainian Orthodox funeral services it is offered to all who attend the funeral.

=== Commemoration of saints ===
It is also customary in the Slavic practice on the feast of the Patron Saint of a church or of a family, or on the feast of saints of special significance to offer koliva. Instead of serving a memorial service, the koliva is set in front of an icon of the saint and a Moleben is served to that saint.

In Lebanon, it is traditionally prepared by the Antiochian Orthodox community for the feast of Saint Barbara.

== See also ==
- Kollyvades Movement
- Memorial service (Orthodox)
- Prayer for the dead
- Kutia - a sweet grain pudding, traditionally served in Russian, Belarus, Ukrainian, Polish and Lithuanian cultures.
- Panikhida
- Prosphora
- Radonitsa
- Saturday of Souls
- Cuccìa - Sicilian sweet grain pudding, served around Christmas.
