= Mid-Pentecost =

Christian feast day

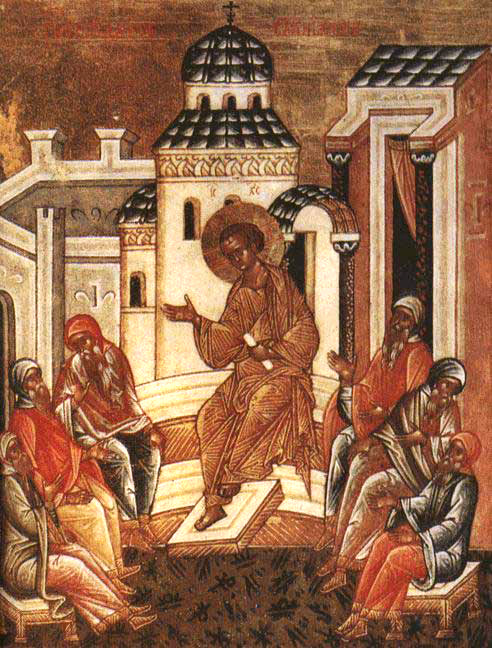
- The twelve-year-old child Jesus in the temple (Russian icon, 15th or 16th century)
- Observed by: Eastern Orthodox Christians, as well as Eastern Lutheran and Eastern Catholic Christians using the Byzantine Rite
- Type: Christian
- Significance: Celebrates Christ as Teacher
- Celebrations: Religious (church) services, festive family meals, blessing of waters
- Observances: Prayer
- Date: 25 Days after Easter
- Frequency: annual
- Related to: Septuagesima, Sexagesima, Quinquagesima, Shrove Tuesday, Ash Wednesday, Lent, Palm Sunday, Maundy Thursday, Good Friday, Holy Saturday, Easter, Ascension, Pentecost, Trinity Sunday, Corpus Christi and the Sacred Heart.

Mid-Pentecost or Midfeast, also Meso-Pentecost (from Greek: Μεσοπεντηκοστή; Russian: Преполове́ние Пятидеся́тницы) is a feast day which occurs during the Paschal season in the Eastern Orthodox Church and those Eastern Catholic Churches and Eastern Lutheran Churches that follow the Byzantine Rite.

Mid-Pentecost celebrates the midpoint between the Feasts of Pascha (Easter) and Pentecost. Specifically, it falls on the 25th day of Pascha. At the feast of Mid-Pentecost, a Small Blessing of the Waters is traditionally performed after the liturgy of the feast.

Mid-Pentecost is a one-week feast which begins on the 4th Wednesday of Pascha, and continues until the following Wednesday. That is to say, it has an Afterfeast of seven days. Throughout these eight days (including the day of the feast) hymns of Mid-Pentecost are joined to those of the Paschal season. Many of the hymns from the first day of the feast are repeated on the Apodosis (leave-taking of the feast). Although it is ranked as a Feast of the Lord and has an Afterfeast, Mid-Pentecost itself is not considered to be one of the Great Feasts of the church year.

The liturgical texts for the feast are found in the Pentecostarion (the liturgical book containing propers for the period from Pascha to Pentecost). There are three Old Testament readings appointed for Vespers; but, uniquely, no Matins Gospel. In some places an All-Night Vigil is celebrated for this feast, though a Vigil is not called for in the Typicon (book of rubrics). At the Divine Liturgy, the reading from the Apostle is Acts 14:6–18.

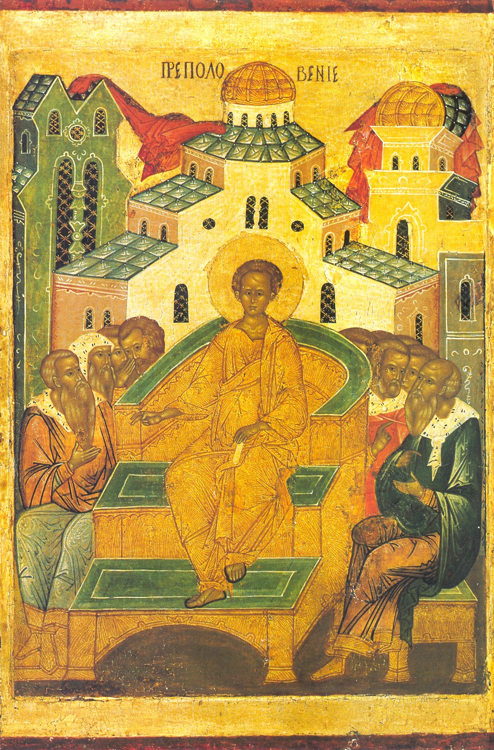
Meso-Pentecost. A 15th century icon from Tver, Russia.

The theme of the feast is Christ as Teacher and the icon of the feast depicts the young Jesus in the Temple in Jerusalem speaking with the Elders (Luke 2:46–47), the first biblical example of Jesus as teacher (Rabbi) following Passover. The Bar Mitzva of Jesus at this time corresponds to the traditional winter birth of Jesus according to all Orthodox Churches since it usually takes place when a boy is 12 and a half. In traditional Orthodox icons of this subject, the figure of Jesus is depicted larger than those of the Elders, showing his superior spiritual status.

The Troparion of the Feast hints at the encounter of Jesus with the Samaritan Woman, which will be celebrated on the following Sunday:

In the middle of the Feast, O Savior, fill my thirsting soul with the waters of godliness, as Thou didst cry to all: 'If anyone thirst, let him come to Me and drink' (John 7:37). O Christ God, Fountain of our life, glory be to Thee!

The scripture verse from John 7, quoted by the Troparion, will be read three weeks later on the day of Pentecost.

Mid-Pentecost, has historically been the Altar Feast of the Cathedral of Hagia Sophia in Constantinople (Istanbul).
