= Christian funeral rites in Byzantium =

Christian funeral rites in Byzantium are little known and even less studied. Elena Velkova Velkovska made some studies focusing on Byzantine tradition in Greek language and defined three major periods, namely the early period (fourth to fifth century), the euchological repertory (eighth to twelfth centuries), and the oldest rite (tenth century).

== Early period (fourth to fifth centuries) ==
The Christian funeral rites in this period included the singing of psalms, and the celebration of the Eucharist at the cemetery. There are also commemorations for the third, ninth, and fortieth day after death, a practice that has been kept in the East until today.

== The euchological repertory (eighth to twelfth centuries) ==
The Christian funeral rites in this period focused on prayers. Based on Barberini, it is known that there were seven prayers often used: there are three prayers for a deceased person; one is a prayer at the bowing of the head; two are for the burial of laity and bishops; one for a monk; and finally a diaconal litany for the dead.

== The oldest rite (tenth century) ==
The Christian funeral rite in this period is a single rite: for both laity and monks. It takes place in the church and consisted of an opening blessing; also psalms of Matins were recited. Psalms of Matins can be replaced by Psalm 90 if the deceased is a monk; litany by the deacon and finally singing of "Alleluia".
