= Memorial service in the Eastern Orthodox Church =

Service for the deceased

A memorial service (Ancient Greek: μνημόσυνον, mnemósynon, 'memorial'; Church Slavonic: панихида, panikhída, from Greek παννυχίς, pannychis, 'vigil' (etymologically 'all-nighter'); Romanian: parastas and Serbian: парастос, parastos, from Greek παράστασις, parástasis) is a liturgical solemn service for the repose of the departed in the Eastern Orthodox and Byzantine Catholic churches.

== Service ==
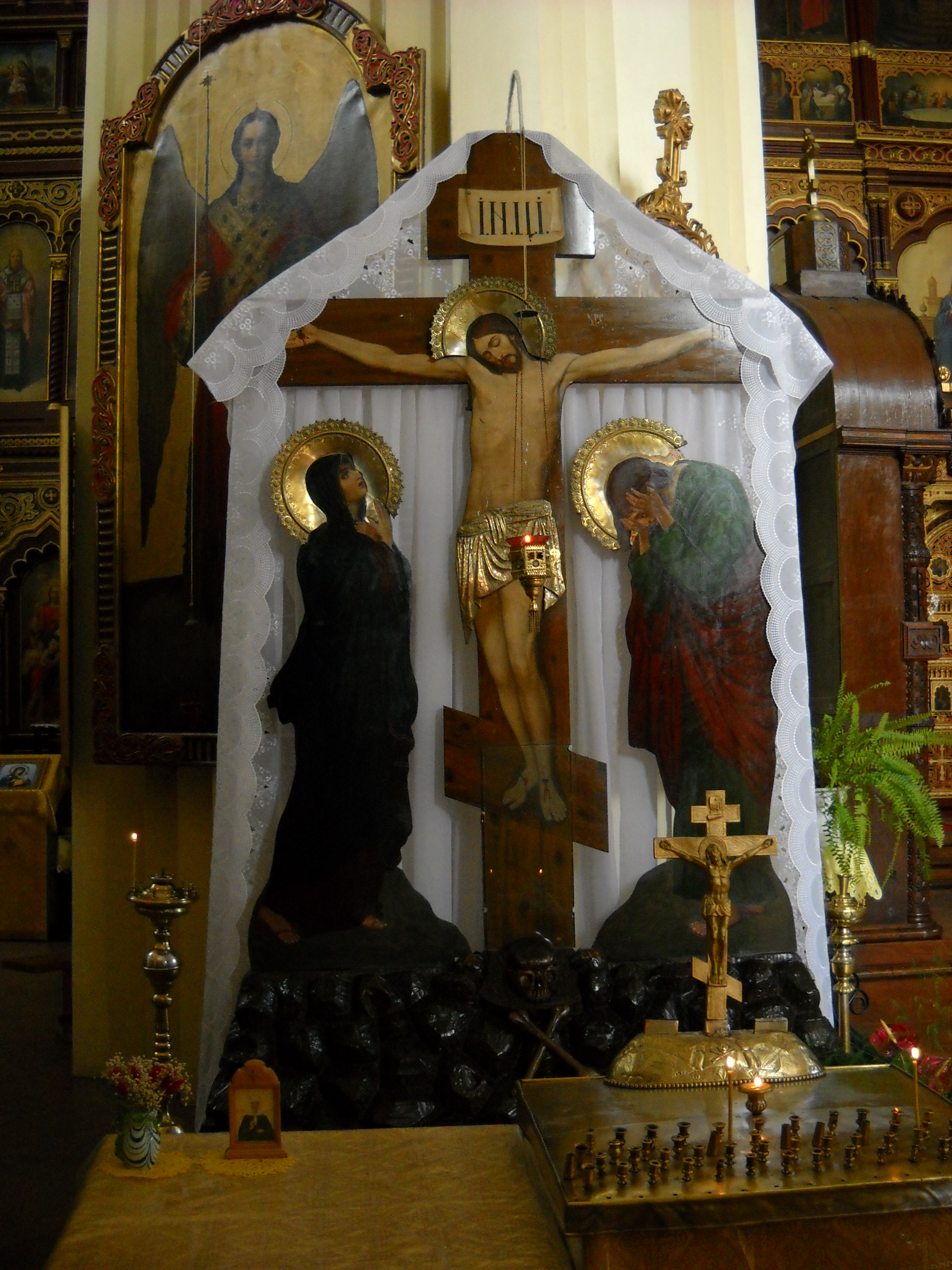
Golgotha (Crucifixion icon), Orthodox cathedral in Vilnius. The lity tray (memorial stand) is at lower right, where the memorial services are celebrated. The stand has holders for the faithful to place candles.

In the Eastern Church, the various prayers for the departed have as their purpose praying for the repose of the departed, comforting the living, and reminding the living of their own mortality and the brevity of this earthly life. For this reason, memorial services have an air of penitence about them. They tend to be served more frequently during the four fasting seasons. (Note: Great Lent, Nativity Fast, Apostles' Fast and Dormition Fast)

If the service is for an individual, it is often held at the deceased's graveside. If it is a general commemoration of all the departed, or if the individual's grave is not close by, the service is held in a church, in front of a special small, free-standing "memorial table", to which is attached an upright crucifix and with a candelabra for the faithful to put lighted candles.

The deacon (or, if there is no deacon, the priest) swings the censer throughout almost the entire service, while all stand holding lighted candles. Near the end of the service, during the final troparia, all either extinguish their candles, or place them in a candle holder by the memorial table. Each candle symbolizes the individual soul, which, as it were, each person holds in his own hand. The extinguishing (or giving up) of the candle, at the end of the service, symbolizes the fact that each person will have to surrender his soul, at the end of his life.

The service is composed of Psalms, ektenias (litanies), hymns and prayers. In its outline it follows the general order of Matins (Note: From this comes the Greek name parastas which refers to standing all night in vigil, which in the early days was what literally took place.) and is, in effect, a truncated funeral service. Some of the most notable portions of the service are the Kontakion of the Departed (Note: Kontakion of the Departed: "With the saints give rest, O Christ, to the soul(s) of Thy servant(s), where there is neither sickness, nor sorrow, nor sighing, but life everlasting.") and the final singing of "Memory Eternal" (Slavonic: Vyechnaya Pamyat).

The memorial service is most frequently served at the end of the Divine Liturgy; however, it may also be served after Vespers, Matins, or as a separate service by itself. If the service is held separately, there are readings from the Pauline epistles and the Gospels, which are assigned by the day of the week; no readings, however, are assigned to Sunday because Sunday should emphasize the resurrection of Christ rather than the departed.

== Koliva ==
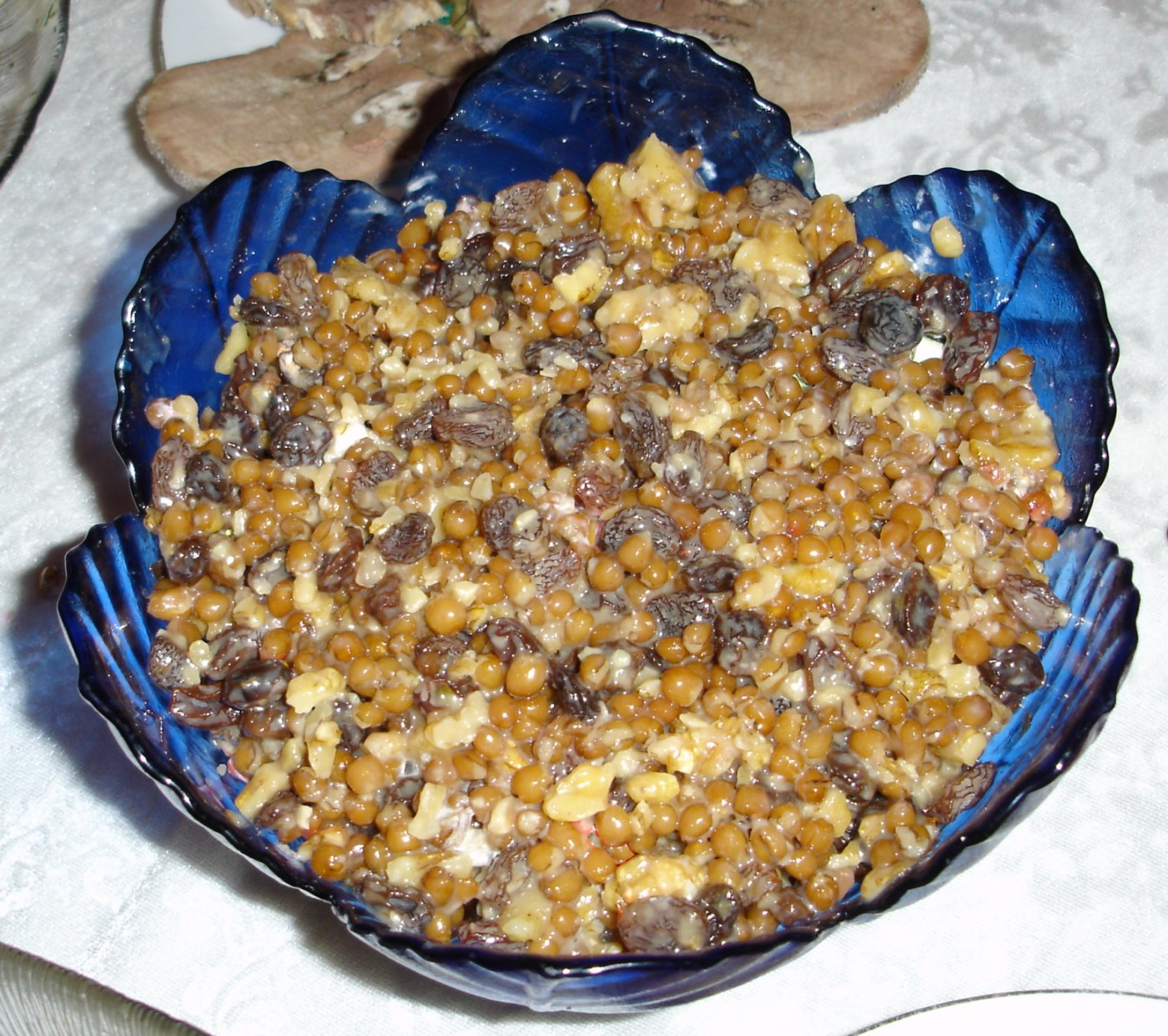
A dish of Koliva made from wheat and raisins, which is traditionally used during Orthodox memorial services.

For the memorial service, koliva (a ritual food of boiled wheat) is often prepared and is placed in front of the memorial table or an icon of Christ. Afterwards, it is blessed by the priest, who sprinkles it with holy water. (Note: in the Bulgarian Church it is also customary for the priest to pour wine on the koliva and on the grave) The koliva is then taken to the refectory and is served to all those who attended the service.

== Occasions ==
After an Orthodox Christian dies there are special "Prayers for the Departure of the Soul" that are said by the priest. Then the family or friends of the departed will wash and dress the body and it is placed in the casket after which a special expanded memorial service called the First Panikhida is celebrated, following which the reading of the Psalter (Note: or the Gospels if the departed be a priest) commences and continues uninterrupted until the funeral.

Traditionally, in addition to the service on the day of death, the memorial service is performed at the request of the relatives of an individual departed person on the following occasions:

- Third day after death (Note: In calculating the number of days, the actual day of death is counted as the first day. According to St. Macarius the Great, the reason for these days is as follows: from the third day to the ninth day after death, the departed is soul is shown the mansions of Paradise (the funeral is normally performed on the third day); from the ninth to the fortieth days, the soul is shown the torments of hell; and on the fortieth day, the soul stands before the throne of God to undergo the Particular Judgement and is assigned the place where it will await the Second Coming. For this reason, the fortieth day is considered to be the most important. In some traditions, the semi-anniversary (six months) is also commemorated.)
- Ninth day
- Fortieth day
- Three months
- Six months
- First anniversary of death
- Third anniversary (some will request a memorial every year on the anniversary of death)

It is also served on the numerous Soul Saturdays throughout the year. (Note: Saturday is generally a day dedicated to prayer for the departed, because Christ lay dead in the Tomb on a Saturday. In some monasteries and large churches, it is customary to serve a Panikhida on every Saturday, unless a major feast occurs on that day.) On these days, not only is the memorial service served, but there are also special propers at Vespers, Matins, and the Divine Liturgy. These days of general memorials are:

- Meatfare Saturday (two Saturdays before Great Lent begins)—in some traditions families and friends will offer Panikhidas for their loved ones during the preceding week, culminating in the general commemoration on Saturday
- The second Saturday of Great Lent
- The third Saturday of Great Lent
- The fourth Saturday of Great Lent
- In the Russian tradition, Radonitsa—Tuesday following Thomas Sunday; i.e., the second Tuesday after Pascha (Easter) (Note: Because of the sacredness of the days, The celebration of memorial services is forbidden during Holy Week and Bright Week.)
- The Saturday before Pentecost—in some traditions families and friends will offer Panikhidas for their loved ones during the preceding week, culminating in the general commemoration on Saturday
- In the Russian tradition, Demetrius Saturday (the Saturday closest to the feast of Saint Demetrius, October 26), commemorating the soldiers who fell in the Battle of Kulikovo (1380), under the leadership of St. Demetrius of the Don. Demetrius Saturday is also observed in other Slavic churches, as well as among the Slavic speakers of northern Greece.

The celebration of memorial services is forbidden from Holy Thursday through Bright Week and on all Sundays throughout the year.

== Lity ==
A very abbreviated form of the memorial service is called the lity (or liti or litya), from the Greek λιτὴ τελετή, litē teletē, i.e. a plain ceremony, or λιτὸν μνημόσυνον, liton mnēmosynon, i.e. a plain mnemosynon; it consists only of the concluding portion of the regular memorial service. This is often celebrated in the narthex of the church on ordinary weekdays (i.e., when there is no higher-ranking feast day), especially during Great Lent.

== In film ==
The 2016 Romanian film Sieranevada features a parastas in a Bucharest apartment and does so with documentary precision. While the priest arrives, the family argues about several issues. The priest and his aides finally arrive, they sing and bless the home and the food that will be distributed as alms. A Wallachian ritual involving a suit is also a plot element.

== See also ==
- Christian funeral rites in Byzantium
- Prayer for the dead (Eastern Christianity)
- Koliva
- Wake (ceremony)
