= Saturday of Souls =

Day for commemoration of the dead

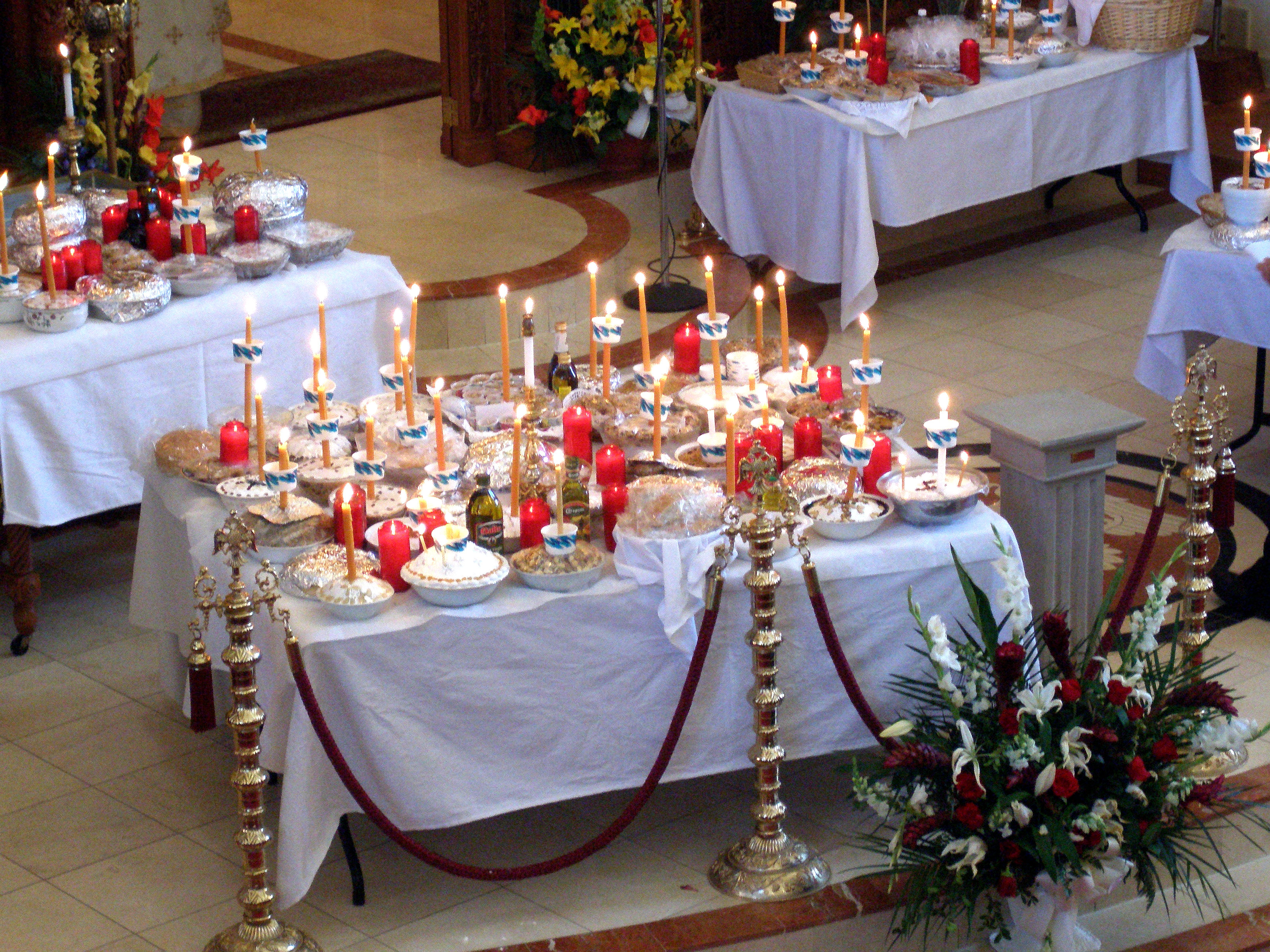
Kollyva offerings of boiled wheat blessed liturgically on Soul Saturday (Psychosabbaton).

Saturday of Souls (or Soul Saturday) is a day set aside for the commemoration of the dead within the liturgical year of the Eastern Orthodox and Eastern Catholic Churches. Saturday is a traditional day of prayer for the dead, because Christ lay dead in the Tomb on Saturday.

These days are devoted to prayer for departed relatives and others among the faithful who would not be commemorated specifically as saints. The Divine Services on these days have special hymns added to them to commemorate the departed. There is often a Panikhida (Memorial Service) either after the Divine Liturgy on Saturday morning or after Vespers on Friday evening, for which Koliva (a dish made of boiled wheatberries or rice and honey) is prepared and placed on the Panikhida table. After the Service, the priest blesses the Koliva. It is then eaten as a memorial by all present.

== Relationship to Radonitsa ==
Another Memorial Day, Radonitsa, does not fall on a Saturday, but on either Monday or Tuesday of the second week after Pascha (Easter). Radonitsa does not have special hymns for the dead at the Divine Services. Instead, a Panikhida will follow the Divine Liturgy, and then, all will bring paschal foods to the cemeteries to greet the departed with the joy of the Resurrection.

== Schedule ==
There are several Soul Saturdays throughout the year:

- The Saturday of Meatfare Week (the second Saturday before Great Lent)
- The second Saturday of Great Lent
- The third Saturday of Great Lent
- The fourth Saturday of Great Lent
- Radonitsa (Monday or Tuesday after St. Thomas Sunday, i.e. Second Sunday of Easter)
- The Saturday before Pentecost
- Intercession Saturday (the Saturday before the Intercession Day, i.e. 1 October).
- Demetrius Saturday (the Saturday before the feast of Saint Demetrius of Thessaloniki, i.e. 26 October).

== Observances by jurisdiction ==
=== Orthodox and Byzantine Catholics ===
All Orthodox and Byzantine Catholics observe Soul Saturdays on Meatfare Saturday (i.e., two Saturdays before the beginning of Great Lent); the second, third and fourth Saturdays of Great Lent; and the Saturday before Pentecost.

=== Bulgarian Orthodox Church ===
In the Bulgarian Orthodox Church, there is a commemoration of the dead on the Saturday before the feast of Saint Michael the Archangel on 8 November instead of the Demetrius Soul Saturday.

=== Russian Orthodox Church ===
The Russians observe memorials on Commemoration Day of Deceased Warriors (9 May), Memorial Day of Orthodox Warriors killed for Faith, Tzar and Fatherland on battlefield (11 September), the Saturdays closest to 26 October (Saint Demetrius) and 23 September (Conception of St. John the Forerunner).

=== Serbian Orthodox Church ===
In the Serbian Orthodox Church, there is also a commemoration of the dead on the Saturday closest to the Conception of St. John the Baptist—23 September.

=== Slavic and Greek Churches ===
In Slavic and Greek Churches, all of the Lenten Soul Saturdays are typically observed. In some of the Churches of the Eastern Mediterranean, Meatfare Saturday, Radonitsa and the Saturday before Pentecost are typically observed.

== See also ==
- Prayer for the dead
- Panikhida
- Koliva
- All Souls Day
- Radonitsa
- Thursday of the Dead
- Totensonntag
