= Great feasts in the Eastern Orthodox Church =

Religious tradition

In the Eastern Orthodox Church, the feast of the death and Resurrection of Jesus, called Pascha (Easter), is the greatest of all holy days and as such it is called the "feast of feasts". Immediately below it in importance, there is a group of Twelve Great Feasts (Greek: Δωδεκάορτον). Together with Pascha, these are the most significant dates on the Orthodox liturgical calendar. Eight of the great feasts are in honor of Jesus Christ, while the other four are dedicated to the Virgin Mary—the Theotokos.

== History and overview ==
The Twelve Great Feasts are as follows (note that the liturgical year begins with the month of September):

1. The Nativity of the Theotokos, 21 September [O.S. 8 September]
2. The Exaltation of the Cross (Roodmas), 27 September [O.S. 14 September]
3. The Presentation of the Theotokos, 4 December [O.S. 21 November]
4. The Nativity of Christ (Christmas), 7 January [O.S. 25 December]
5. The Baptism of Christ (Theophany, also called Epiphany), 19 January [O.S. 6 January]
6. The Presentation of Jesus at the Temple (Candlemas), 15 February [O.S. 2 February]
7. The Annunciation, 7 April [O.S. 25 March]
8. The Entry into Jerusalem (Flowery/Willow/Palm Sunday), the Sunday before Easter
9. The Ascension of Christ, forty days after Easter
10. Pentecost, fifty days after Easter
11. The Transfiguration of Jesus, 19 August [O.S. 6 August]
12. The Dormition of the Theotokos, 28 August [O.S. 15 August]

With the exception of the Presentation/Entrance of the Theotokos, appointed hymns for all of the Twelve Great Feasts are found in the Georgian Iadgari (Chantbook) of Jerusalem which was compiled in approximately the middle of the 6th century. Thus eleven of the twelve feasts were celebrated in the Greek East for some time prior, as most of the hymnographic content is datable to the 5th century.

Besides the Twelve Great Feasts, the Orthodox Church knows five other feasts that rank as great feasts, yet without being numbered among the twelve. They are: the Circumcision of Christ (14 January [O.S. 1 January]), the Nativity of St. John the Baptist (7 July [O.S. 24 June]), the Feast of Saints Peter and Paul (12 July [O.S. 29 June]), the Beheading of St John the Baptist (11 September [O.S. 29 August]), and the Intercession of the Theotokos (14 October [O.S. 1 October]).

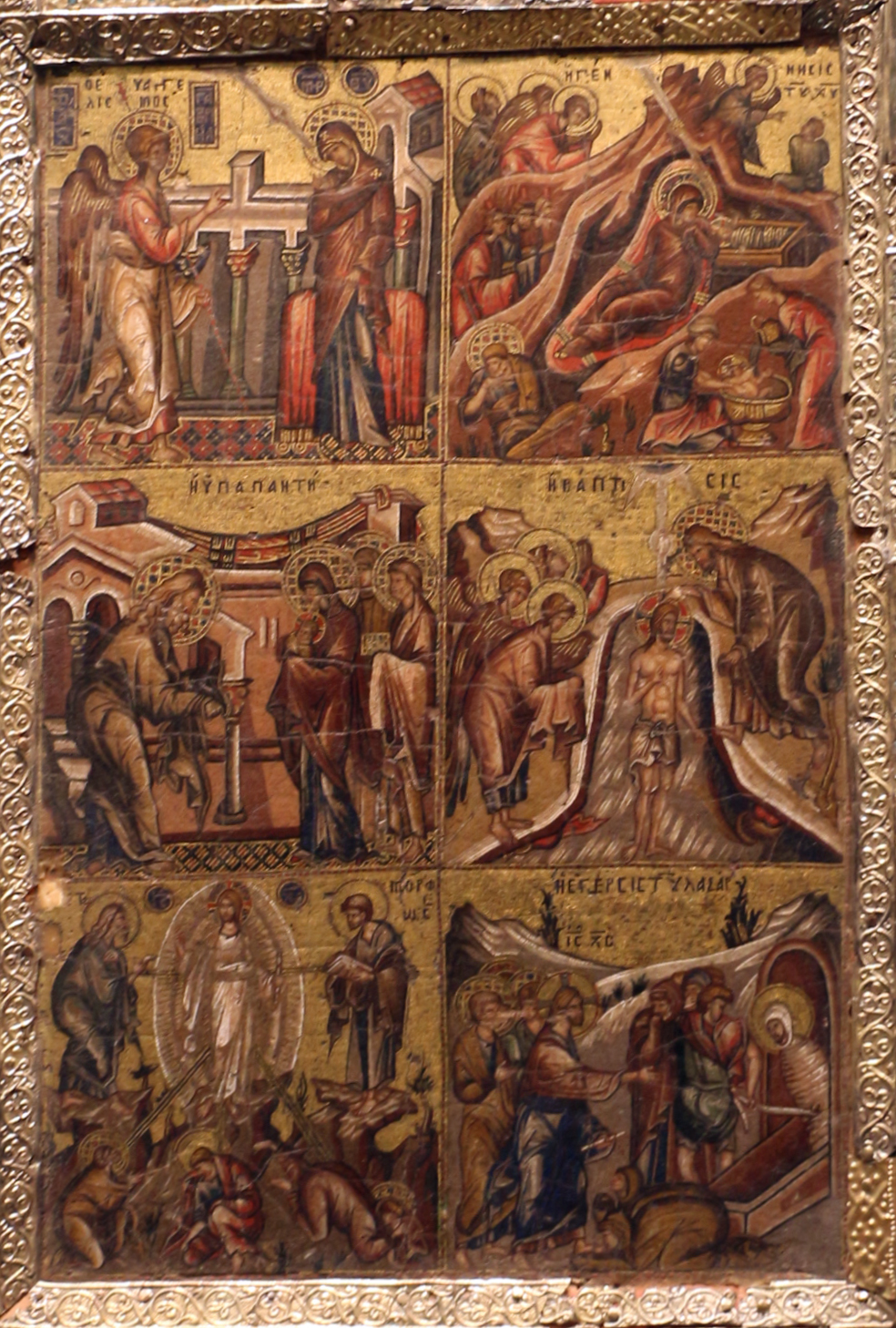
Wing from a Byzantine micromosaic diptych of the 12 Great Feasts, c. 1310. From top left: Annunciation, Nativity, Presentation, Baptism, Transfiguration, Raising of Lazarus.

In Byzantine art a slightly different group were often depicted as a set, omitting the first three in the list above, and adding the Raising of Lazarus (Lazarus Saturday), Crucifixion of Jesus (Good Friday), and Harrowing of Hell (Holy Saturday).

== Explanations ==
=== Nativity of the Theotokos ===
Mary was born to elderly and previously barren parents by the names of Joachim and Anna (now saints), in answer to their prayers. Orthodox Christians do not hold to the Roman Catholic doctrine of the Immaculate Conception of Mary, in which it is taught that Mary was preserved from the ancestral sin that befalls us all as descendants of Adam and Eve, in anticipation of her giving birth to the sinless Christ. The Orthodox believe that Mary, and indeed all mankind, was born only to suffer the consequences of the ancestral sin (being born into a corrupt world surrounded by temptations to sin), the chief of which was the enslavement to Death, and thus needed salvation from this enslavement, like all mankind. The Roman Catholic doctrine of the Immaculate Conception also recognizes that Mary was in need of salvation, viewing her as prevented from falling into the scar of sin, instead of being pulled up out of it. Orthodox thought does vary on whether Mary actually ever sinned, though there is general agreement that she was cleansed from sin at the Annunciation.

=== Exaltation of the Holy Cross ===
The Exaltation of the Holy Cross (also called the Elevation of the Cross) commemorates the recovery of the cross on which Jesus Christ was crucified. The Persians had captured it as a prize of war in Jerusalem in the year 614, and it was recovered by the forces of the Eastern Roman Empire ("Byzantine Empire") in 629. The cross was joyously held up for veneration by the Christian faithful upon its recovery.

=== Presentation of the Theotokos ===
According to Tradition, Mary was taken—presented—to the Jewish Temple in Jerusalem as a young girl, where she lived and served until her betrothal to Joseph.

=== Nativity of the Lord ===
The nativity account (Gospel of Luke 2:1–20) begins with Mary and Joseph (Mary's betrothed) traveling to Bethlehem to be enrolled in the Roman census ordered by Augustus Caesar. On the way, they look for a place for Mary to give birth to her child, but all the inns are full and the only suitable place is a cave (show as a stable in most Western descriptions) where animals are kept. The Theotokos (God-bearer, the Virgin Mary) gives birth ineffably (without pain or travail) and remains virgin after childbirth.

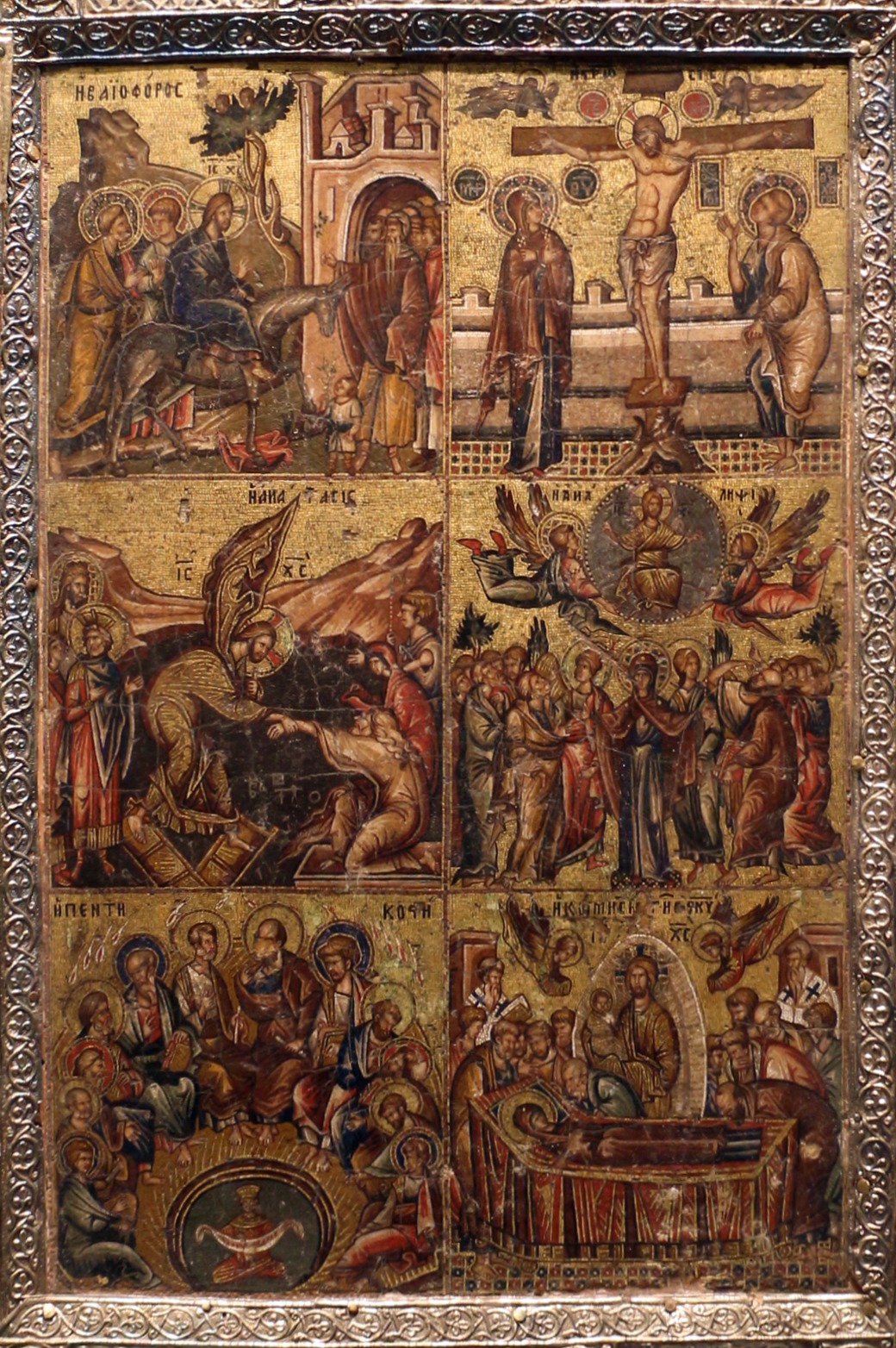
Wing from a Byzantine micromosaic diptych of the 12 Great Feasts, c. 1310. From top left: Entry into Jerusalem, Crucifixion of Jesus, Harrowing of Hell, Ascension of Christ, Pentecost, Dormition of the Theotokos.

=== Theophany (Baptism of the Lord) ===
This observance commemorates Christ's baptism by John the Baptist in the River Jordan, and the beginning of Christ's earthly ministry (Gospel of Matthew 3:13–17, Gospel of Mark 1:9–11). It is known by the Orthodox as both Epiphany (i.e., manifestation) and Theophany (manifestation of God). These are bundled, along with Christmas, differently in some eastern Christian traditions.

=== Presentation of the Lord ===
In the Gospel of Luke 2:22–35, Mary and Joseph took the baby Jesus to the Temple in Jerusalem. He was received in the arms of the elder Simeon, who then prayed, "Now let Thy servant depart (die) in peace,...for I have seen Thy salvation." This was one of the things that Mary "pondered in her heart"—the fact that others recognized that her Son was the Messiah. This feast is also known as the Meeting of the Lord, or Hypapante.

=== Annunciation ===
According to the Gospel of Luke 1:26–38, the angel Gabriel appeared to Mary to announce to her that she would conceive and bear a son, even though she "knew no man." This date is selected to be exactly nine months ahead of Christmas, indicating that Christ was conceived at that time "by the Holy Spirit and the Virgin Mary", as stated in the Nicene Creed.

=== Entry into Jerusalem (Palm Sunday) ===
A mere few days before His brutal crucifixion, Jesus was received by adoring throngs at his entry into Jerusalem on the back of young donkey (Gospel of Matthew 21:1–11). The crowds threw palm branches in his path in jubilation, and even the children shouted praises to Him. The Orthodox celebrate this day with joy, but with the realization that very sad events are soon to come. Among the Russian Orthodox, willow branches are substituted in the celebration of this event, owing to the lack of availability of palm trees in Slavic climates.

=== Ascension ===
Forty days after the Resurrection, while blessing His disciples (Gospel of Luke 24:50–51), Christ ascended into heaven (Gospel of Mark 16:19), taking His place at the right hand of the Father (Nicene Creed). While the disciples were still looking into the air for Jesus, an angel appeared and told them that the Lord would return again in the same manner as they had seen him go into heaven (Acts of the Apostles 1:9–11).

=== Pentecost ===
Fifty days after the Resurrection, on the existing Jewish feast of Shavuot, while the disciples and many other followers of Jesus were gathered together to pray, the Holy Spirit descended upon them in the form of "cloven tongues of fire", with the sound of a rushing mighty wind, and they began to speak in languages that they did not know. There were many visitors from the Jewish diaspora to Jerusalem at that time for the Jewish observance of the feast, and they were astonished to hear these untaught fishermen speaking praises to God in their alien tongues (Acts of the Apostles 2:1–11).

=== Transfiguration ===
Jesus had gone with his disciples (later called apostles) Peter, James, and John (also called John the Evangelist) to Mount Tabor. Christ's appearance was changed while they watched into a glorious radiant figure. There appeared Elijah and Moses, speaking with Jesus. The disciples were amazed and terribly afraid. This event shows forth the divinity of Christ, so that the disciples would understand after his Ascension that He was truly the radiant splendor of the Father, and that his Passion was voluntary. Gospel of Mark 9:2–9

=== Dormition of the Theotokos ===
The Orthodox feast of the Dormition is analogous to what Roman Catholicism calls the Assumption of Mary. According to Orthodox Tradition, Mary died like all humanity, "falling asleep", so to speak, as the name of the feast indicates. (Catholic theologians are divided on the issue of whether Mary died. Today most would favor an actual death before the Assumption.) The Apostles were miraculously summoned to this event, and all were present except Thomas when Mary passed from this life. She was buried. Thomas arrived three days later, and desiring to see her one more time, convinced the other apostles to open her tomb. To their surprise, her body was not there.

This event is seen as a first symbol of the resurrection of the faithful that will occur at the Second Coming of Christ. The event is normally called the "Dormition", though there are many Orthodox Churches with the name "Assumption". In Greek, "Dormition" is "Kimisis" (Coemesis) – falling asleep in death — from which the word "cemetery" derives.

== See also ==
- Eastern Orthodox liturgical calendar
- Paschal Cycle
