= Prayer for the dead =

Funerary prayers for deceased people

Religions with the belief in a final judgment, a resurrection of the dead or an intermediate state (such as Hades or purgatory) often offer prayers on behalf of the dead to God.

== Buddhism ==
For most funerals that follow the tradition of Chinese Buddhism, common practices include chanting the name of Amitabha, or reciting Buddhist scriptures such as the Sutra of The Great Vows of Ksitigarbha Bodhisattva, Amitabha Sutra, Diamond Sutra or a combination of classic Buddhist scriptures, such as the Great Compassion Mantra, the Heart Sutra, the Amitabha Pure Land Rebirth Mantra and Sapta Atitabuddha Karasaniya Dharani (or Qi Fo Mie Zui Zhen Yan 七佛滅罪真言).

Other practices include Ritsu offer refuge, Pure Land Buddhists nianfo or chant Pure Land Rebirth Dhāraṇī and Tibetan Buddhists chant Om mani padme hum repeatedly. Prayers such as Namo Ratnasikhin Tathagata are for animals.

== Christianity ==
=== New Testament ===
A passage in the New Testament which is seen by some to be a prayer for the dead is found in 2 Timothy 1:16–18, which reads as follows:

May the Lord grant mercy to the house of Onesiphorus, for he often refreshed me, and was not ashamed of my chain, but when he was in Rome, he sought me diligently, and found me (the Lord grant to him to find the Lord's mercy on that day); and in how many things he served at Ephesus, you know very well.

As with the verses in 2 Maccabees 12:38–46, these verses reflect the deep-felt desire that God will deal mercifully with the deceased "on that day" (perhaps Judgement Day, see also Eschatology). It is not stated that Onesiphorus, for whom Saint Paul or the writer of the epistle prayed, was dead, though some scholars infer this, based on the way this only refers to him in the past tense, and prays for present blessings on his household, but for him only "on that day". And towards the end of the same letter, in 2 Timothy 4:19, we find a greeting to "Prisca and Aquila, and the house of Onesiphorus", distinguishing the situation of Onesiphorus from that of the still living Prisca and Aquila.

=== Tradition ===
Prayer for the dead is well documented within early Christianity, both among prominent Church Fathers and the Christian community in general. In the Catholic Church the assistance that the dead receive by prayer on their behalf is linked with the process of purification known as purgatory. In Eastern Orthodoxy, Christians pray for "such souls as have departed with faith, but without having had time to bring forth fruits worthy of repentance". While prayer for the dead continues in both these traditions and in those of Oriental Orthodoxy and the Assyrian Church of the East, many Protestant groups reject the practice.

The tomb of the Christian Abercius of Hieropolis in Phrygia (latter part of the 2nd century) bears the inscription: "Let every friend who observes this pray for me", i.e. Abercius, who throughout speaks in the first person.

The inscriptions in the Roman catacombs bear similar witness to the practice, by the occurrence of such phrases as:

- Mayst thou live among the saints (3rd century);
- May God refresh the soul of ... ;
- Peace be with them.

Among Church writers Tertullian († 230) is the first to mention prayers for the dead: "The widow who does not pray for her dead husband has as good as divorced him". This passage occurs in one of his later writings, dating from the beginning of the 3rd century. Subsequent writers similarly make mention of the practice as prevalent, not as unlawful or even disputed (until Arius challenged it towards the end of the 4th century). The most famous instance is Saint Augustine's prayer for his mother, Monica, at the end of the 9th book of his Confessions, written around 398.

An important element in the Christian liturgies both East and West consisted of the diptychs, or lists of names of living and dead commemorated at the Eucharist. To be inserted in these lists was a confirmation of one's orthodoxy, and out of the practice grew the official canonization of saints; on the other hand, removal of a name was a condemnation.

In the middle of the 3rd century, St. Cyprian enjoined that there should be no oblation or public prayer made for a deceased layman who had broken the Church's rule by appointing a cleric trustee under his will: "He ought not to be named in the priests prayer who has done his best to detain the clergy from the altar."

Although it is not possible, as a rule, to name dates for the exact words used in the ancient liturgies, yet the universal occurrence of these diptychs and of definite prayers for the dead in all parts of the Christian Church, East and West, in the 4th and 5th centuries shows how primitive such prayers were. The language used in the prayers for the departed is asking for rest and freedom from pain and sorrow. A passage from the Liturgy of St James reads:

Remember, O Lord, the God of Spirits and of all Flesh, those whom we have remembered and those whom we have not remembered, men of the true faith, from righteous Abel unto to-day; do thou thyself give them rest there in the land of the living, in thy kingdom, in the delight of Paradise, in the bosom of Abraham, Isaac and Jacob, our holy fathers, from whence pain and sorrow and sighing have fled away, where the light of thy countenance visiteth them and always shineth upon them.

Public prayers were only offered for those who were believed to have died as faithful members of the Church. But Saint Perpetua, who was martyred in 202, believed herself to have been encouraged in a vision to pray for her brother, who had died in his eighth year, almost certainly unbaptized; and a later vision assured her that her prayer was answered and he had been translated from punishment. St. Augustine thought it needful to point out that the narrative was not canonical Scripture, and contended that the child had perhaps been baptized.

=== Catholic Church ===
In the West there is ample evidence of the custom of praying for the dead in the inscriptions of the catacombs, with their constant prayers for the peace and refreshment of the souls of the departed and in the early liturgies, which commonly contain commemorations of the dead; and Tertullian, Cyprian and other early Western Fathers witness to the regular practice of praying for the dead among the early Christians.

However, in the case of martyred Christians, it was felt that it was inappropriate to pray "for" the martyrs, since they were believed to be in no need of such prayers, having instantly passed to the beatific vision of Heaven. Theoretically, too, prayer for those in hell (understood as the abode of the eternally lost) would be useless. However, since there is no certainty that any particular person is in hell, prayers are offered for all the dead, except for those believed to be in heaven who are prayed to, not for. In prayers for the dead, there is usually reference to them being in purgatory. In view of the certainty that by the process of purification and with the help of the prayers of the faithful they were destined for heaven, they are referred to as the "holy souls".

Limits were placed on public offering of Mass for the unbaptised, non-Catholics, and notorious sinners, but prayers and even Mass in private could be said for them. The present Code of Canon Law of the Catholic Church states that, unless the person concerned gave some signs of repentance before death, no form of funeral Mass may be offered for notorious apostates, heretics and schismatics; for those who for anti-Christian motives chose that their bodies be cremated; and for other manifest sinners to whom a Church funeral could not be granted without public scandal to the faithful.

On the other hand, "provided their own minister is not available, baptised persons belonging to a non-catholic Church or ecclesial community may, in accordance with the prudent judgement of the local Ordinary, be allowed Church funeral rites, unless it is established that they did not wish this."

During the slaughter of the First World War, Pope Benedict XV on 10 August 1915 allowed all priests everywhere to say three Masses on All Souls' Day. The two extra Masses were in no way to benefit the priest himself: one was to be offered for all the faithful departed, the other for the Pope's intentions, which at that time were presumed to be for all the victims of that war. The permission remains.

Each Eucharistic Prayer, including the Roman Canon of the Order of Mass, has a prayer for the departed.

In Communio Sanctorum, the Lutheran and Catholic Churches in Germany agreed that prayer for the dead "corresponds to the communion in which we are bound together in Christ ... with those who have already died to pray for them and to commend them ... to the mercy of God." Likewise, in the United States, the Evangelical Lutheran Church and Catholic Church formulated a statement The Hope of Eternal Life, which affirmed that "there is communion among the living and the dead across the divide of death. ...Prayerful commendation of the dead to God is salutary within a funeral liturgy. ...Insofar as the resurrection of the dead and the general final judgment are future events, it is appropriate to pray for God's mercy for each person, entrusting that one to God's mercy."

Tridentine Mass contains three prayers for the dead:

- Suscipe Sancte Pater:

Accept, O holy Father, Almighty and eternal God, this unspotted Host (Victim), which I Thy unworthy servant offer unto Thee, my living and true God, for my innumerable sins, offences and negligences and for all here present; as also for all faithful Christians, both living and dead, that it may avail both me and them for salvation unto life everlasting. Amen.

— Nikolaus Gihr, The Holy Sacrifice of the Mass: Dogmatically, Liturgically and Ascetically Explained

- Commemoration of the dead (Memento etiam, Domine):

Remember also, O Lord, Thy servants and handmaids, N. and N., who have gone before us with the sign of faith, and sleep the sleep of peace. To these, O Lord, and to all who rest in Christ, grant, we beseech Thee, a place of refreshment, of light, and of peace. Through Christ our Lord. Amen.

— Nikolaus Gihr, The Holy Sacrifice of the Mass: Dogmatically, Liturgically and Ascetically Explained

- Placeat tibi:

May the performance of my homage be pleasing to Thee, O Holy Trinity; and grant that the Sacrifice which I, though unworthy, have offered up in the sight of Thy Majesty, may be acceptable unto Thee, and may, through Thy mercy, be a propitiation for myself and all those for whom I have offered it. Through Christ our Lord. Amen.

— Nikolaus Gihr, The Holy Sacrifice of the Mass: Dogmatically, Liturgically and Ascetically Explained

=== Eastern Orthodoxy and Oriental Orthodoxy ===
==== Theology ====
Eastern and Oriental Orthodox reject the term "purgatory". Prayer for the dead is encouraged in the belief that it is helpful for them, although how the prayers of the faithful help the departed is not elucidated. Eastern Orthodox simply believe that tradition teaches that prayers should be made for the dead.

Saint Basil the Great (379 CE) writes in his Third Kneeling Prayer at Pentecost: "O Christ our God ... (who) on this all-perfect and saving Feast, art graciously pleased to accept propitiatory prayers for those who are imprisoned in hades, promising unto us who are held in bondage great hope of release from the vileness that doth hinder us and did hinder them, ... send down Thy consolation ... and establish their souls in the mansions of the Just; and graciously vouchsafe unto them peace and pardon; for not the dead shall praise thee, O Lord, neither shall they who are in Hell make bold to offer unto thee confession. But we who are living will bless thee, and will pray, and offer unto thee propitiatory prayers and sacrifices for their souls."

Saint Gregory Dialogus († 604) in his famous Dialogues (written in 593) teaches that, "The Holy Sacrifice (Eucharist) of Christ, our saving Victim, brings great benefits to souls even after death, provided their sins (are such as) can be pardoned in the life to come." However, St. Gregory goes on to say, the Church's practice of prayer for the dead must not be an excuse for not living a godly life on earth. "The safer course, naturally, is to do for ourselves during life what we hope others will do for us after death." Father Seraphim Rose († 1982) says: "The Church's prayer cannot save anyone who does not wish salvation, or who never offered any struggle (podvig) for it himself during his lifetime."

==== Eastern Orthodox praxis ====
The various prayers for the departed have as their purpose to pray for the repose of the departed, to comfort the living, and to remind those who remain of their own mortality. For this reason, memorial services have an air of penitence about them.

The Church's prayers for the dead begin at the moment of death, when the priest leads the Prayers at the Departure of the Soul, consisting of a special Canon and prayers for the release of the soul. Then the body is washed, clothed and laid in the coffin, after which the priest begins the First Panikhida (prayer service for the departed). After the First Panikhida, the family and friends begin reading the Psalter aloud beside the casket. This reading continues and concludes until the next morning, in which usually the funeral is held, up until the time of the orthros.

Orthodox Christians offer particularly fervent prayers for the departed on the first 40 days after death. Traditionally, in addition to the service on the day of death, the memorial service is performed at the request of the relatives of an individual departed person on the following occasions:

- Third day after death
- Ninth day
- Fortieth day
- First anniversary of death
- Third anniversary (some will request a memorial every year on the anniversary of death)

In addition to Panikhidas for individuals, there are also several days during the year that are set aside as special general commemorations of the dead, when all departed Orthodox Christians will be prayed for together (this is especially to benefit those who have no one on earth to pray for them). The majority of these general commemorations fall on the various "Soul Saturdays" throughout the year (mostly during Great Lent). On these days, in addition to the normal Panikhida, there are special additions to Vespers and Matins, and there will be propers for the departed added to the Divine Liturgy. These days of general memorial are:

- Meatfare Saturday (two Saturdays before Great Lent begins); in some traditions families and friends will offer Panikhidas for their loved ones during the week, culminating in the general commemoration on Saturday
- The second Saturday of Great Lent
- The third Saturday of Great Lent
- The fourth Saturday of Great Lent
- Radonitsa (the second Tuesday after Easter)
- The Saturday before Pentecost; in some traditions families and friends will offer Panikhidas for their loved ones during the week, culminating in the general commemoration on Saturday
- Demetrius Saturday (the Saturday before the feast of Saint Demetrius, October 26). In the Bulgarian Orthodox Church there is a commemoration of the dead on the Saturday before the feast of Saint Michael the Archangel, November 8, instead of the Demetrius Soul Saturday.

The most important form of prayer for the dead occurs in the Divine Liturgy. Particles are cut from the prosphoron during the Proskomedie at the beginning of the Liturgy. These particles are placed beneath the Lamb (Host) on the diskos, where they remain throughout the Liturgy. After the Communion of the faithful, the deacon brushes these particles into the chalice, saying, "Wash away, O Lord, the sins of all those here commemorated, by Thy Precious Blood, through the prayers of all thy saints." Of this action, Saint Mark of Ephesus says, "We can do nothing better or greater for the dead than to pray for them, offering commemoration for them at the Liturgy. Of this they are always in need. ...The body feels nothing then: it does not see its close ones who have assembled, does not smell the fragrance of the flowers, does not hear the funeral orations. But the soul senses the prayers offered for it and is grateful to those who make them and is spiritually close to them."

Normally, candidates for sainthood, prior to their Glorification (Canonization) as a saint, will be commemorated by serving Panikhidas. Then, on the eve of their Glorification will be served an especially solemn Requiem, known as the "Last Panikhida".

=== Lutheran Church ===
The Lutheran Reformers recognized that the early Church had practiced prayer for the dead, and accepted it in principle. Thus in the 1580 Book of Concord, the Lutheran Church taught:

"... we know that the ancients speak of prayer for the dead, which we do not prohibit; but we disapprove of the application ex opere operato of the Lord's Supper on behalf of the dead."

The Lutheran cleric Richard Futrell wrote that "The historic practice within the Lutheran Church had prayers for the dead in their Prayer of the Church. For example, if we were to look at a typical Lutheran service during Luther’s lifetime, we would find in the Prayer of the Church not only intercessions, special prayers, and the Lord’s Prayer, which are still typical today in Lutheran worship, but also prayers for the dead." For those who have died, Martin Luther declared that 'I regard it as no sin to pray with free devotion in this or some similar fashion: Dear God, if this soul is in a condition accessible to mercy, be thou gracious to it. (Luther’s Works, Volume 37) To console women whose children were not born and baptized, Martin Luther wrote in 1542: "In summary, see to it that above all else you are a true Christian and that you teach a heartfelt yearning and praying to God in true faith, be it in this or in any other trouble. Then do not be dismayed about your child or yourself. Know that your prayer is pleasing to God and that God will do everything much better than you can comprehend or desire. 'Call upon me,' he says in Psalm 50. 'In the day of trouble; I will deliver you, and you shall glorify me.' For this reason, we ought not to condemn such infants. Believers and Christians have devoted their longing and yearning and praying for them." However, with regard to what he perceived as nonscriptural extensions of the practice (such as repeated Requiem Masses for the dead), in the same year 1542 he stated in his Preface to the Burial Hymns: "Accordingly, we have removed from our churches and completely abolished the popish abominations, such as vigils, Masses for the dead, processions, purgatory, and all other hocus-pocus on behalf of the dead".

The largest Lutheran denomination in the United States, the Evangelical Lutheran Church in America, "remembers the faithful departed in the Prayers of the People every Sunday, including those who have recently died and those commemorated on the church calendar of saints". In Funeral rites of the Evangelical Lutheran Church, "deceased are prayed for" using "commendations: 'keep our sister/brother ... in the company of all your saints. And at the last ... raise her/him up to share with all the faithful the endless joy and peace won through the glorious resurrection of Christ our Lord.'" The response for these prayers for the dead in this Lutheran liturgy is the prayer of Eternal Rest: "Rest eternal grant him/her, O Lord; and let light perpetual shine upon him/her".

The most recent edition of Luther's Small Catechism widely used among communicants of the Lutheran Church–Missouri Synod (LCMS) recommends:

For whom should we pray?...We should pray for ourselves and for all other people, even for our enemies. In scripture, we have no command or encouragement to pray for the dead (see Hebrews 9:27). Those who die in Christ do not need our prayers. Those who die apart from Christ cannot be helped by our prayers.

This question and answer do not appear in Luther's original text, but reflect the views of the twentieth-century Lutherans who added this explanation to the catechism. The LCMS does not prohibit the practice of praying for the dead, however, and has continued the practice, most notably on All Saint's Day where the church prays:

Let us pray to the Lord, our God and Father, who raised Jesus from the dead. For all God’s chosen people whom He has knit together in the one mystical body of His Son, that He would give His whole Church in heaven and on earth His light and His peace, let us pray to the Lord: Lord, have mercy.

The conservative Lutheran denomination WELS teaches:

Lutherans do not pray for the souls of the departed. When a person dies his soul goes to either heaven or hell. There is no second chance after death. The Bible tells us, "Man is destined to die once and after that to face judgment" (Hebrew 9:27, see also Luke 16:19-31). It would do no good to pray for someone who has died.

=== Anglicanism ===
The Church of England's 1549 Book of Common Prayer still had prayer for the dead, as (in the Communion Service): "We commend into thy mercy all other thy servants, which are departed hence from us with the sign of faith and now do rest in the sleep of peace: grant unto them, we beseech thee, thy mercy and everlasting peace." But since 1552 the Book of Common Prayer has no express prayers for the dead, and the practice is denounced in the Homily "On Prayer" (part 3). Nonjurors included prayers for the dead, a practice that spread within the Church of England in the mid-nineteenth century, and was authorized in 1900 for forces serving in South Africa and since then in other forms of service. Many jurisdictions and parishes of the Anglo-Catholic tradition continue to practice prayer for the dead, including offering the Sunday liturgy for the peace of named departed Christians and keeping All Souls' Day.

The 1979 Book of Common Prayer of the Episcopal Church (United States) includes prayers for the dead. The prayers during the Sunday Eucharistic Liturgy include intercessions for the repose of the faithful departed. Furthermore, most of the prayers in the burial rite are for the deceased, including the opening collect:

O God, whose mercies cannot be numbered: Accept our prayers on behalf of thy servant N., and grant him an entrance into the land of light and joy, in the fellowship of thy saints; through Jesus Christ thy Son our Lord, who liveth and reigneth with thee and the Holy Spirit, one God, now and forever. Amen.

According to the Catechism in the 1979 Book of Common Prayer, "We pray for (the dead), because we still hold them in our love, and because we trust that in God's presence those who have chosen to serve him will grow in his love, until they see him as he is." Although this statement indicates that prayer is typically made for those who are known to have been members of the Church ("those who have chosen to serve him"), prayer is also offered for those whose faith was uncertain or unknown – authorized options in the Prayer Book burial rite allow for prayers that thus entrust the deceased to the mercy of God while retaining integrity about what was known of the deceased's religious life. For example, following the intercessions, there are two options for a concluding prayer: the first begins, "Lord Jesus Christ, we commend to you our brother (sister) N., who was reborn by water and the Spirit in Holy Baptism ..."; the second, however, would be appropriate for one whose faith and standing before God is not known:

Father of all, we pray to you for N., and for all those whom we love but see no longer. Grant to them eternal rest. Let light perpetual shine upon them. May his soul and the souls of all the departed, through the mercy of God, rest in peace. Amen.

=== Methodist Church ===
John Wesley, the founder of the Methodist Church, stated that: "I believe it to be a duty to observe, to pray for the Faithful Departed". He "taught the propriety of Praying for the Dead, practised it himself, provided Forms that others might." Two such prayers in the Forms are "O grant that we, with those who are already dead in Thy faith and fear, may together partake of a joyful resurrection" and also, "By Thy infinite mercies, vouchsafe to bring us, with those that are dead in Thee, to rejoice together before Thee." As such, many Methodists pray "for those who sleep." Shane Raynor, a Methodist writer, explains the practice saying that it is "appropriate to pray for others in the community, even across time and space", referencing the doctrine of Communion of Saints being a "community made up of all past, present, and future Christians". In a joint statement with the Catholic Church in England and Wales, the Methodist Church of Great Britain affirmed that "Methodists who pray for the dead thereby commend them to the continuing mercy of God."

=== Moravian Church ===
In its Easter liturgy, the Moravian Church prays for those "departed in the faith of Christ" and "give[s] thanks for their holy departure".

=== Reformed Churches ===
Reformed churches are often opposed to prayer for the dead, because it is seen as useless. However, the Presbyterian Church USA has a "commemoration of those who have died in the faith." They are not petitions for the dead but reminders that the church on earth is a part of a larger company of saints with the church in heaven. Other prayers combine thanksgivings for the dead with petitions for the living.

=== Irvingian Churches ===
The New Apostolic Church, the largest of the Irvingian Churches, practices prayer for the dead. Divine Services for the faithful departed take place thrice a year; additionally, "New Apostolic Christians also pray that souls who have died in an unredeemed state may find salvation in Christ."

=== Other churches ===
Prayer for the dead is not practiced by members of Baptist and nondenominational Christian churches. For example, members of the Baptist churches hold that "dead men receive no benefit from the prayers, sacrifices, &c. of the living."

=== The Church of Jesus Christ of Latter-day Saints ===
The Church of Jesus Christ of Latter-day Saints has a number of sacred ordinances and rituals that are performed for the dead. Among these are baptism for the dead and the sealing (marriage and parent-child sealing) of the dead to families. These practices are based upon multiple New Testament scriptures, some of which are 1 Corinthians 15:29-32 and Matthew 16:19.

== Hinduism ==
In Hinduism there are funeral speeches with prayers for the dead. Many of these funeral speeches are read out from the Mahabharata, usually in Sanskrit. Family members will pray around the body as soon as possible after death. People try to avoid touching the corpse as it is considered polluting.

== Islam ==
In Islam, Muslims of their community gather to their collective prayers for the forgiveness of the dead, a prayer is recited and this prayer is known as the Salat al-Janazah (Janazah prayer). Like Eid prayer, the Janazah prayer incorporates an additional (four) Takbirs, the Arabic name for the phrase Allahu Akbar, but there is no Ruku' (bowing) and Sujud (prostrating). Supplication for the deceased and mankind is recited. In extraordinary circumstances, the prayer can be postponed and prayed at a later time as was done in the Battle of Uhud.

Dogma states it is obligatory for every Muslim adult male to perform the funeral prayer upon the death of any Muslim, but the dogma embraces the practical in that it qualifies: when Janazah is performed by the few it alleviates that obligation for all.

In addition, phrases such as "May Allah grant him/her paradise" are often said when speaking of the deceased.

== Judaism ==
Prayers for the dead form part of the Jewish services. The prayers offered on behalf of the deceased consist of: Recitation of Psalms; Reciting a thrice daily communal prayer in Aramaic which is known as Kaddish. Kaddish actually means "Sanctification" (or "Prayer of Making Holy") which is a prayer "In Praise of God"; or other special remembrances known as Yizkor; and also a Hazkara which is said either on the annual commemoration known as the Yahrzeit as well on Jewish holidays. The form in use in England contains the following passage: "Have mercy upon him; pardon all his transgressions. ...Shelter his soul in the shadow of Thy wings. Make known to him the path of life."

El Maleh Rachamim is the actual Jewish prayer for the dead, although less well known than the Mourner's Kaddish. While the Kaddish does not mention death but rather affirms the steadfast faith of the mourners in God's goodness, El Maleh Rachamim is a prayer for the rest of the departed. There are various translations for the original Hebrew which vary significantly.

A record of Jewish prayer and offering of sacrifice for the dead at the time of the Maccabees is seen being referred to in 2 Maccabees, a book written in Greek, which, though not accepted as part of the Jewish Bible, is regarded as canonical by Eastern Christianity and the Roman Catholic Church:

But under the tunic of each of the dead they found amulets sacred to the idols of Jamnia, which the law forbids the Jews to wear. So it was clear to all that this was why these men had been slain. They all therefore praised the ways of the Lord, the just judge who brings to light the things that are hidden. Turning to supplication, they prayed that the sinful deed might be fully blotted out. The noble Judas warned the soldiers to keep themselves free from sin, for they had seen with their own eyes what had happened because of the sin of those who had fallen. He then took up a collection among all his soldiers, amounting to two thousand silver drachmas, which he sent to Jerusalem to provide for an expiatory sacrifice. In doing this, he acted in a very excellent and noble way, inasmuch as he had the resurrection of the dead in view; for if he were not expecting the fallen to rise again, it would have been useless and foolish to pray for them in death. But if he did this with a view to the splendid reward that awaits those who had gone to rest in godliness, it was a holy and pious thought. Thus he made atonement for the dead that they might be freed from this sin.

Jacques Le Goff, French historian and agnostic, concluded: "At the time of Judas Maccabeus – around 170 B.C., a surprisingly innovative period – prayer for the dead was not practiced, but that a century later, it was practiced by certain Jews."

This extract does not explain on what grounds Le Goff argued that prayer for the dead was not in use in the first half of the 2nd century BC. The account of the action of Judas Maccabaeus was written midway through the second half of the same century, in about 124 BC, and in the view of Philip Schaff its mention of prayer for the dead "seems to imply habit".

== Mandaeism ==
In Mandaeism, the masiqta is a lengthy ceremony for the dead performed over many days. Many prayers from the Qulasta and other Mandaean texts are recited during a masiqta, of which there are several types.

== Baháʼí Faith ==
Followers of the Baháʼí Faith believe that the soul continues to progress toward God in the afterlife. In fact, the Baháʼí definition of heaven and hell are nearness and remoteness from God in the afterlife, respectively. The belief is that souls continue their journeys, though can be aided in their progress by the saying of prayers for the departed. Here is a sample of one such prayer:

O my God! O Thou forgiver of sins, bestower of gifts, dispeller of afflictions!

Verily, I beseech thee to forgive the sins of such as have abandoned the physical garment and have ascended to the spiritual world.

O my Lord! Purify them from trespasses, dispel their sorrows, and change their darkness into light. Cause them to enter the garden of happiness, cleanse them with the most pure water, and grant them to behold Thy splendors on the loftiest mount.

- ʻAbdu'l-Bahá

The Prayer for the Dead is a particular prayer for the departed, said at Baháʼí funerals before interment.

== Taoism ==
Taoists chant Qinghuahao (青華誥) or Jiukujing (救苦經).

== Zoroastrianism ==
Zoroastrians chant prayers for the dead in their funeral ceremonies, asking God to forgive the deceased.

== Yoruba and derived religions ==
In orisha-based traditions, the mojuba is the praise chant which praises Olodumare, the orishas, the religious lineage, the blood lineage of ancestors, and the various other beings of the universe.

== See also ==
- All Souls' Day
- Baptism for the dead
- Book of the Dead
- Intercession of saints
- Posthumous marriage
- Requiem
- Saturday of Souls
- Veneration of the dead
- Veneration of the saints
