= Hallelujah =

Religious interjection

Hallelujah written in Modern Hebrew

Hallelujah (/ˌhæləˈluːjɑː/; Biblical Hebrew: הַלְלוּ־יָהּ, romanized: haləlū-Yāh, Modern Hebrew: הַלְּלוּ־יָהּ, romanized: halləlū-Yāh, lit. 'praise Yah') is an interjection from the Hebrew language, used as an expression of gratitude to God. The term is used 24 times in the Tanakh (in the book of Psalms), twice in deuterocanonical books, and four times in the Christian Book of Revelation.

The phrase is used in Judaism as part of the Hallel prayers, and in Christian prayer, where since the earliest times it is used in various ways in liturgies, especially those of the Catholic Church, the Lutheran Churches and the Eastern Orthodox Church, the three of which use the Latin form alleluia, which is based on the alternative Greek transliteration.

== Etymology ==
Hallelujah is a transliteration of Hebrew: הַלְּלוּ יָהּ (hal[lə]lū yāh), which means "praise ye Jah!" (from הַלְּלוּ, "praise ye!" and יָהּ, "Jah"). The word hallēl (הַלֵּל) in Hebrew means a joyous praise in song. The second part, Yah, is a shortened form of YHWH (Yahweh or Jehovah in modern English). It has been suggested that the acclamation arises from and is an onomatopoeic rendition of the ancient tradition of ululation.

== Interpretation ==
In the Hebrew Bible hallelujah is actually a two-word phrase, hal(le)lu-Yah, and not one word. The first part, hallelu, is the second-person imperative masculine plural form of the Hebrew verb hillel (הִלֵּל). From Hebrew הַלְלוּ־יָהּ (haləlū-yāh) “praise Yah,” combining the plural imperative of הָלַל (“to praise”) with יָהּ, the short theophoric form of the Tetragrammaton. The phrase "hallelujah" translates to "praise Jah/Yah", though it carries a deeper meaning as the word hallel in Hebrew means a joyous praise in song, to boast in God.

The second part, Yah, is a shortened form of YHWH, and is a shortened form of his name "God, Jah, or Jehovah". The name ceased to be pronounced in Second Temple Judaism, by the 3rd century BC due to religious beliefs. The correct pronunciation is not known. However, it is sometimes rendered in non-Jewish sources as "Yahweh" or "Jehovah". The Septuagint translates Yah as Kyrios (the LORD, stylized in all-capitals in English), because of the Jewish custom of replacing the sacred name with "Adonai", meaning "my Lord".

The linguist Ghil'ad Zuckermann argues that the word Hallelujah is usually not replaced by a praise God! translation due to the belief in iconicity: the perception that there is something intrinsic about the relationship between the sound of the word and its meaning.

== In the Bible ==
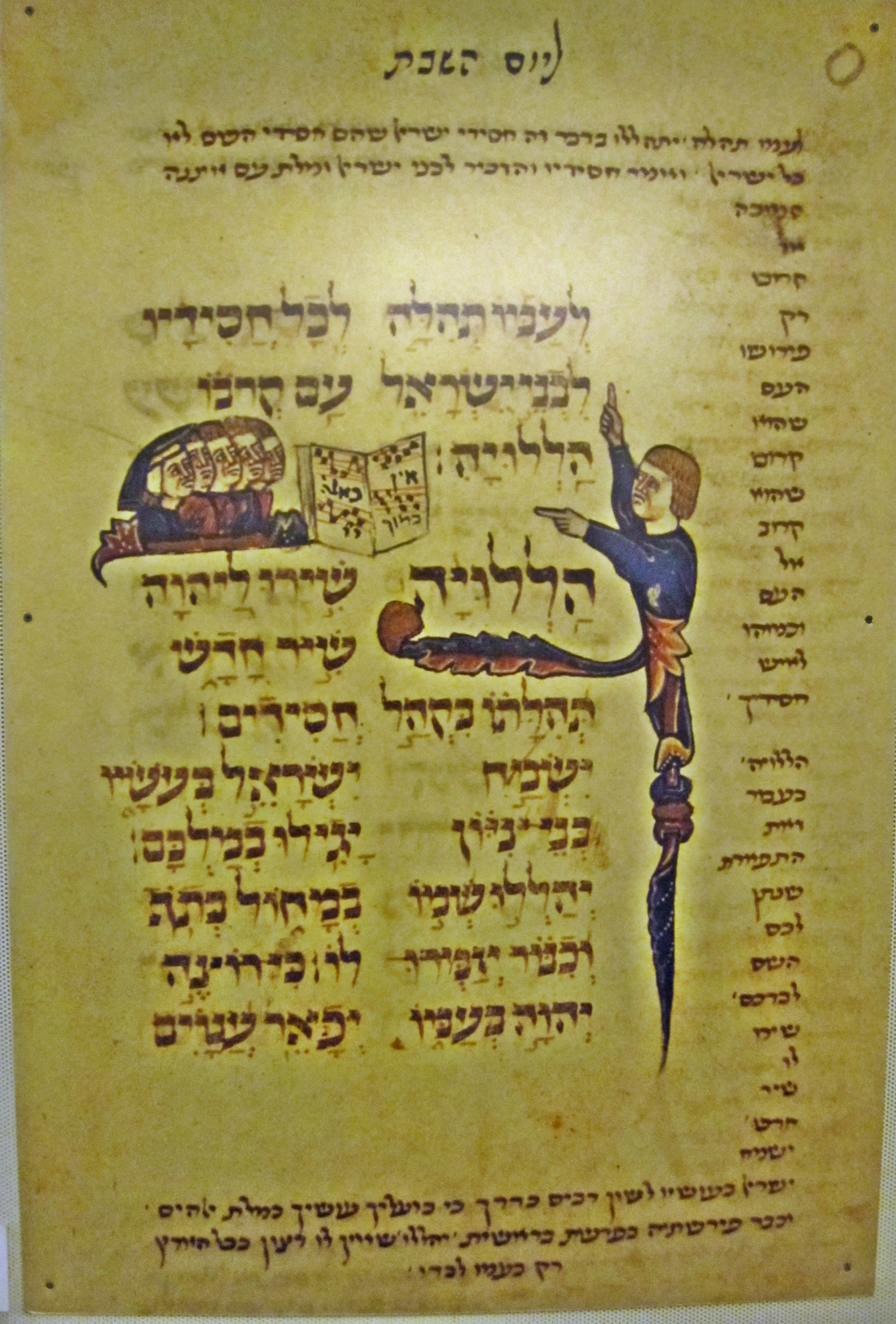
13th century French manuscript; the words "Hallelu-Yah" at the end of Psalm 148 and at the start of Psalm 149 appear above and below the man's left-pointing hand.

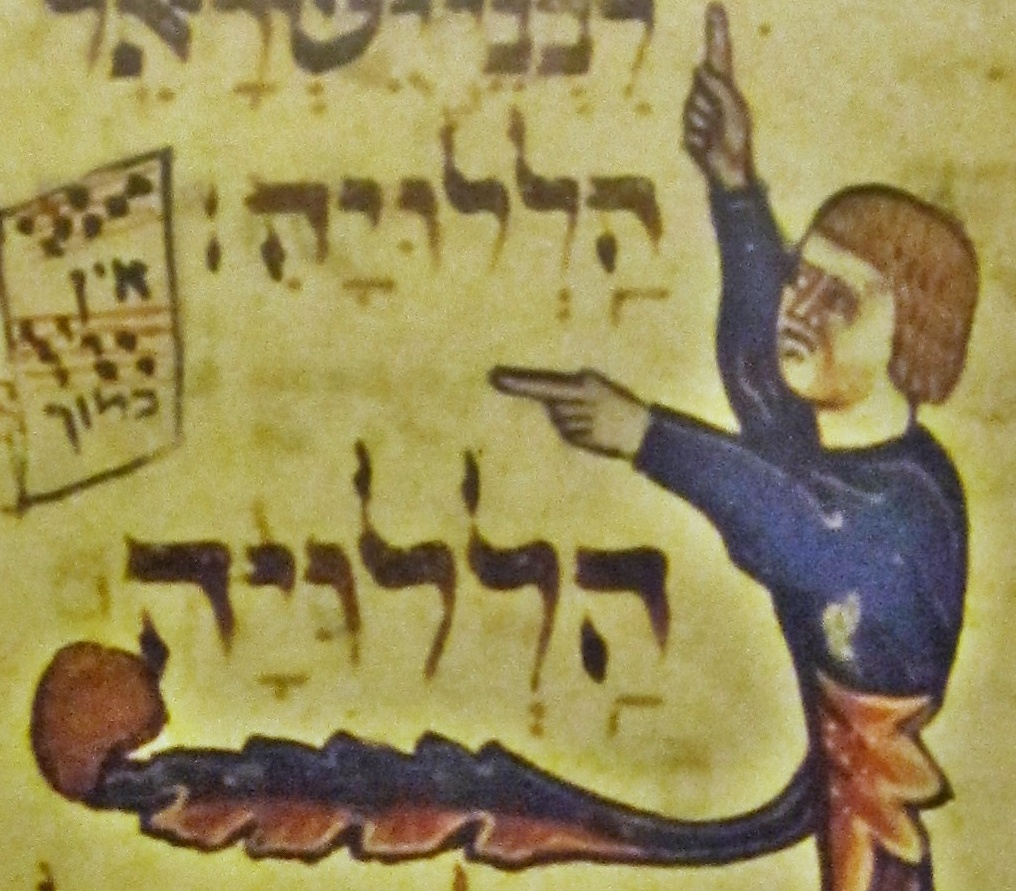
Two times "Hallelu-Yah" (הַלְּלוּ יָהּ), cropped from the manuscript page above. French 13th century.

הַלְּלוּיָהּ is found in 24 verses in the Book of Psalms (104–106, 111–117, 135, 146–150), but twice in Psalm 150:6. It starts and concludes a number of Psalms.

The Greek transliteration ἀλληλούϊα (allēlouia) appears in the Septuagint version of these Psalms, in Tobit 13:17 and 3 Maccabees 7:13, and four times in Revelation 19:1–6, the great song of praise to God for his triumph over the Whore of Babylon. It is this usage that Charles Jennens extracted for the Hallelujah Chorus in Handel's Messiah. This transliteration is the basis of the alternative Latin transliteration "Alleluia" that is also used by Christians.

== Usage by Jews ==
The word "hallelujah" is sung as part of the Hallel Psalms (interspersed between Psalms 113–150). In Tractate Shabbat of the Talmud, Rabbi Yose is quoted as saying that the Pesukei dezimra Psalms should be recited daily. Psalms 145–150, also known as the Hallel of pesukei dezimra, are included to fulfill this requirement in the liturgy for the traditional Jewish Shacharit (morning) service. In addition, on the three Pilgrimage Festivals, the new moon and Hanukkah, Psalms 113-118 are recited. The latter psalms are known simply as Hallel with no additional qualification.

Psalms 146:10, ending with Halleluja, is the third and final biblical quotation in the Kedushah. This expanded version of the third blessing in the Amidah is said during the Shacharit and Mincha (morning and afternoon) services when there is a minyan present. Psalms 106,111,112,113,135,146-150 are typically Referred as "Hallelujah Psalms".

== Usage by Christians ==
Christian Mass, singing Hallelujah

For most Christians, "Hallelujah" is considered a joyful word of praise to God, rather than an injunction to praise him. The word "Alleluia", a Latin derivative of the Hebrew phrase "Hallelujah" has been used in the same manner, though in Christian liturgy, the "Alleluia" specifically refers to a traditional chant, combining the word with verses from the Psalms or other scripture. In the Latin liturgical rites of the Catholic Church, and in many older Protestant denominations, such as the Lutheran Churches, the Alleluia, along with the Gloria in excelsis Deo, is not spoken or sung in liturgy during the season of Lent, instead being replaced by a Lenten acclamation, while in Eastern Churches, Alleluia is chanted throughout Lent at the beginning of the Matins service, replacing the Theos Kyrios, which is considered more joyful. At the Easter service and throughout the Pentecostarion, Christos anesti is used in the place where Hallelujah is chanted in the western rite expressing happiness.

In day-to-day situations, the expressions of "Hallelujah" and "Praise the Lord" are used by Christians as spontaneous expressions of joy, thanksgiving and praise towards God. In contemporary worship services across denominational lines, the use of these jubilatory phrases require no specific prompting or call or direction from those leading times of praise and singing. In Methodist worship, "Hallelujah!" is a frequently used ejaculatory prayer.

In Christian worship, Alleluia is used as a liturgical chant in which that word is combined with verses of scripture, usually from the Psalms. This chant is commonly used before the proclamation of the Gospel. In Western Christianity, congregations commonly cease using the word Alleluia during the period of Lent but restore it into their services at Easter. The form of praise "Alleluia" is used by Christians to thank and glorify God; it finds itself present in many prayers and hymns, especially those related to Eastertide, such as "Christ the Lord is Risen Today".

The Hebrew word Hallelujah as an expression of praise to God was preserved, untranslated, by the Early Christians as a superlative expression of thanksgiving, joy, and triumph. Thus it appears in the ancient Greek Liturgy of St. James, which is still used to this day by the Patriarch of Jerusalem and, in its Syriac recension is the prototype of that used by the Maronites. In the Liturgy of St. Mark, we find this rubric: "Then follow let us attend, the Apostle, and the Prologue of the Alleluia." The "Apostle" is the usual ancient Eastern title for the Epistle reading, and the "Prologue of the Alleluia" would seem to be a prayer or verse before Alleluia was sung by the choir.

=== Western use ===
==== Roman Rite ====
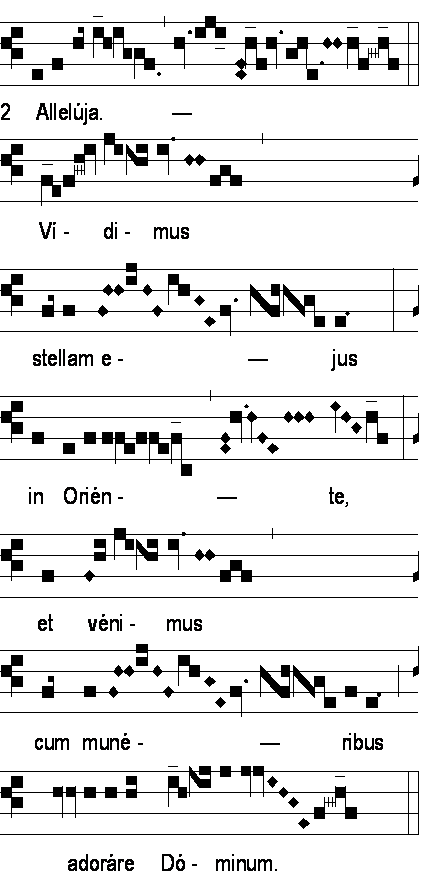
Example of a pre-Gospel Alleluia with verse

In the Roman Rite the word Alleluia is associated with joy and is especially favoured in Paschal time, the time between Easter and Pentecost, perhaps because of the association of the hallel (Alleluia psalms) chanted at Passover. During this time, the word is added widely to verses and responses associated with prayers, to antiphons of psalms, and, during the Octave of Easter and on Pentecost Sunday, to the dismissal at the end of Mass ("Ite missa est").

On the other hand, the word Alleluia is excluded from the Roman liturgy during Lent, often euphemistically referred to during this time as the "A-word". In pre-1970 forms of the Roman Rite it is excluded also in the pre-Lenten Septuagesima period and in Masses for the Dead. The same word, which normally follows the Gloria Patri at the beginning of each hour of the Liturgy of the Hours and which in the present ordinary form of the Roman Rite is omitted during Lent, is replaced in pre-1970 forms by the phrase Laus tibi, Domine, rex aeternae gloriae (Praise to thee, O Lord, king of eternal glory) in Lent and the Septuagesima period.

The term Alleluia is used also to designate a chant beginning and ending with this word and including a verse of scripture, in particular a chant to greet and welcome the Lord whose word will be proclaimed in the Gospel reading. The choir or a cantor sings "Alleluia". The congregation repeats this. The choir or cantor then sings a verse taken from the Mass Lectionary or the Roman Gradual, after which the congregation again sings "Alleluia". In Lent the verse alone is sung or the word Alleluia is replaced by a different acclamation taken from the Gradual, or a tract is sung. If singing is not used, the Alleluia and its verse may be omitted at any season.

The complex plainchant setting in the Roman Gradual requires a high degree of skill and is mostly used only in monasteries and seminaries. This melismatic Gregorian chant opens with the cantor singing "Alleluia". The choir repeats it, adding to the final syllable a long melisma called a jubilus. (The Liber Usualis notates the repeat with the Roman numeral "ij" (2) and continues with the jubilus.) The cantor then sings the main part of the verse, and the choir joins in on the final line. The cantor then repeats the opening Alleluia, and the choir repeats only the jubilus. The music is generally ornate, but often within a narrow range. The Alleluia for Christmas Eve, for instance, has an ambitus of only a perfect fifth, a rather extreme example.

Alleluias were frequently troped, both with added music and text. It is believed that some early Sequences derived from syllabic text being added to the jubilus, and may be named after the opening words of the Alleluia verse. Alleluias were also among the more frequently used chants to create early organa, such as in the Winchester Troper.

The Alleluia and its verse is replaced during Lent and in the pre-1970 form of the Roman Rite Mass also during Septuagesima time by a Tract. On the other hand, during Eastertide the Gradual is replaced with an Alleluia chant, thus putting two such chants before the Gospel reading.

=== Eastern uses ===
==== Byzantine Rite ====
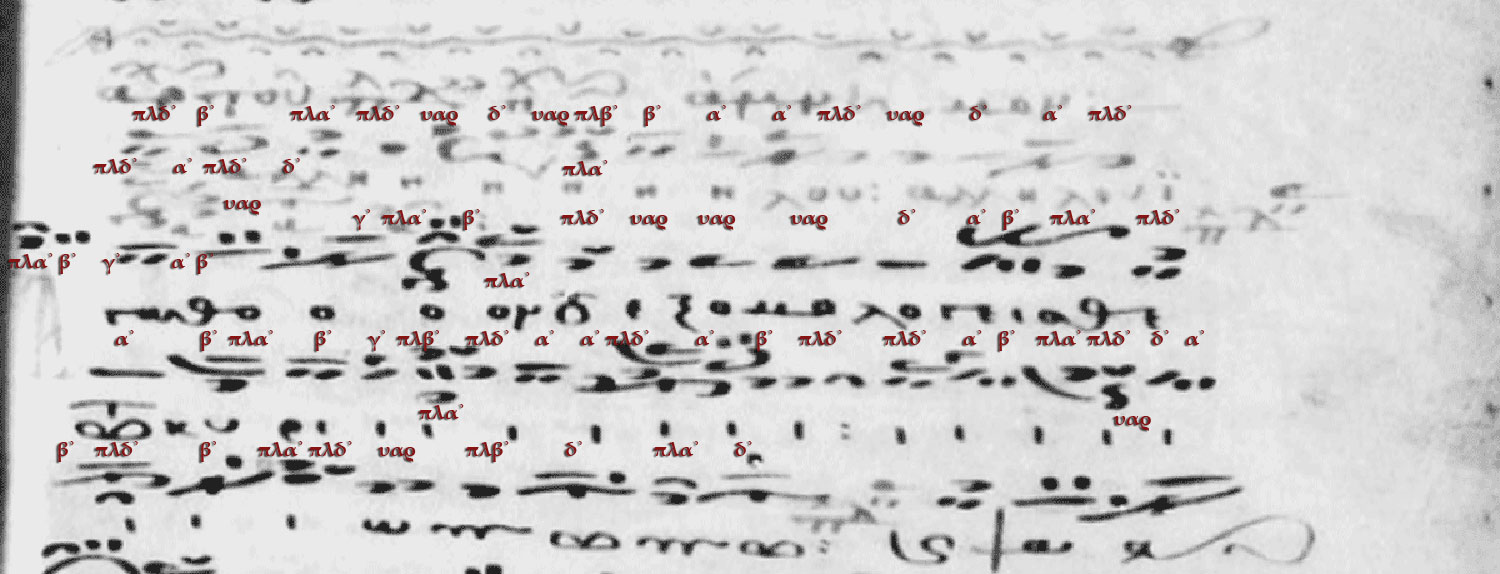
Psalm 91 ᾿Αγαθὸν τὸ ἐξομολογεῖσθαι τῷ κυρίῳ καὶ ψάλλειν τῷ ὀνόματί σου with the alleluiaria in echos plagios tetartos (allelouia refrains written in red ink before the echos plagios section) in a kontakarion about 1300 (F-Pn fonds grec, Ms. 397, f.43r)

In the Eastern Orthodox, as well as Byzantine Rite Eastern Catholic and Eastern Lutheran Churches, after reading the Apostle (Epistle) at the Divine Liturgy, the Reader announces which of the Eight Tones the Alleluia is to be chanted in. The response of the choir is always the same: "Alleluia, alleluia, alleluia." What differs is the tone in which it is sung, and the stichera (psalm verses) which are intoned by the Reader.

The Alleluia is paired with the Prokeimenon which preceded the reading of the Apostle. There may be either one or two Alleluias, depending upon the number of Prokeimena (there may be up to three readings from the Apostle, but never be more than two Prokeimena and Alleluia).

In the Russian/Slavic order, the Alleluia is intoned in one of the two following manners, depending upon the number of Prokeimena (The Antiochian/Byzantine practice is slightly different):

===== One Alleluia =====
Deacon: "Let us attend."
Reader: "Alleluia in the ____ Tone."
Choir: "Alleluia, alleluia, alleluia."
The Reader then chants the first sticheron of the Alleluia.
Choir: "Alleluia, alleluia, alleluia."
The Reader then chants the second sticheron of the Alleluia.
Choir: "Alleluia, alleluia, alleluia."

===== Two Alleluias =====
Deacon: "Let us attend."
Reader: "Alleluia in the ____ Tone:" Then he immediately chants the first sticheron of the first Alleluia.
Choir: "Alleluia, alleluia, alleluia."
The Reader then chants the second sticheron of the first Alleluia.
Choir: "Alleluia, alleluia, alleluia."
Reader: "In the ____ Tone:" And he chants the first sticheron of the second Alleluia.
Choir: "Alleluia, alleluia, alleluia."

===== Lenten Alleluia =====
Among the Orthodox, the chanting of Alleluia does not cease during Lent, as it does in the West. This is in accordance with the Orthodox approach to fasting, which is one of sober joy. During the weekdays of Great Lent and certain days during the lesser Lenten seasons (Nativity Fast, Apostles' Fast, and Dormition Fast), the celebration of the Divine Liturgy on weekdays is not permitted. Instead, Alleluia is chanted at Matins. Since this chanting of Alleluia at Matins is characteristic of Lenten services, Lenten days are referred to as "Days with Alleluia."

The Alleluia at Matins is not related to scripture readings or Prokeimena; instead, it replaces "God is the Lord..." It is sung in the Tone of the Week and is followed by the Hymns to the Trinity (Triadica) in the same tone (see Octoechos for an explanation of the eight-week cycle of tones).

"God is the Lord..." would normally be intoned by the deacon, but since the deacon does not serve on days with Alleluia, it is intoned by the priest. He stands in front of the icon of Christ on the Iconostasis, and says:

Priest: "Alleluia in the ____ Tone: Out of the night my spirit waketh at dawn unto Thee, O God, for Thy commandments are a light upon the earth."
Choir: "Alleluia, alleluia, alleluia."
Priest: "Learn righteousness, ye that dwell upon the earth."
Choir: "Alleluia, alleluia, alleluia."
Priest: "Zeal shall lay hold upon an uninstructed people."
Choir: "Alleluia, alleluia, alleluia."
Priest: "Add more evils upon them, O Lord, lay more evils upon them that are glorious upon the earth."
Choir: "Alleluia, alleluia, alleluia."

===== Alleluia for the departed =====
Alleluia is also chanted to a special melody at funerals, memorial services (Greek: Parastas, Slavonic: Panikhida), and on Saturdays of the Dead. Again, it is chanted in place of "God is the Lord...", but this time is followed by the Troparia of the Departed.

The Alleluia is intoned by the deacon (or the priest, if no deacon is available):

Deacon: "Alleluia, in the 8th tone: Blessed are they whom Thou hast chosen and taken unto Thyself, O Lord."
Choir: "Alleluia, Alleluia, Alleluia."
Deacon: "Their memory is from generation to generation."
Choir: "Alleluia, Alleluia, Alleluia."
Deacon: "Their souls will dwell amid good things."
Choir: "Alleluia, Alleluia, Alleluia."

On Saturdays of the Dead, which are celebrated several times throughout the year, the prokeimenon at Vespers is also replaced with Alleluia, which is chanted in the following manner:

Deacon: "Alleluia, in the 8th tone."
Choir: "Alleluia, Alleluia, Alleluia."
Deacon: "Blessed are they whom Thou hast chosen and taken unto Thyself, O Lord."
Choir: "Alleluia, Alleluia, Alleluia."
Deacon: "Their memory is from generation to generation."
Choir: "Alleluia, Alleluia, Alleluia."

===== Other uses =====
Gospel readings are appointed for other services as well, particularly those in the Trebnik. A number of these are preceded by an Alleluia, in the same manner as that chanted at the Divine Liturgy, though sometimes there are no stichera (psalm verses).

During the sacred mystery (Sacrament) of baptism, in addition to the Alleluia before the Gospel, the choir also chants an Alleluia while the priest pours the Oil of Catechumens into the baptismal font.

== In popular culture ==
In modern English, "Hallelujah" is frequently spoken to express happiness that a thing hoped or waited for has happened. An example is its use in the song "Get Happy".

"Hallelujah" was the winning song of the Eurovision Song Contest 1979, performed in Hebrew by Milk and Honey, including Gali Atari, for Israel.

Leonard Cohen's 1984 song "Hallelujah" was initially rejected by Columbia Records for lacking commercial appeal, was popularized through covers by John Cale (1991) and Jeff Buckley (1994), achieved "modern ubiquity" after its inclusion in the animated movie Shrek (2001), and reached the Billboard charts upon Cohen's death in 2016.

== See also ==
- Praise the Lord, a greeting phrase used by many Christians
- Alhamdulillah (ٱلْحَمْدُ لِلَّٰهِ), similar Arabic phrase used by Muslims and by Arabic-speaking Jews and Christians
- Allahu Akbar (ٱللَّٰهُ أَكْبَرُ), similar Arabic phrase
- Subhan Allah (سُبْحَانَ ٱللَّٰهِ), similar Arabic phrase
- "My Sweet Lord", a 1970 song by George Harrison which includes hallelujah along with Hare Krishna
- Alle Psallite Cum Luya
- Alleluia, dulce carmen
