= Theos Kyrios =

Greek psalm response

Theos Kyrios (Greek: Θεὸς Κύριος, "God is the Lord", or "The Lord is God") is a psalm response chanted near the beginning of the Matins service in the Rite of Constantinople, observed by the Eastern Orthodox and Byzantine Catholic churches. It is based principally on Psalm 117 (Septuagint numbering). The refrain is composed of verses v. 27a and 26a.

Theos Kyrios comes after the Great Ektenia (litany) and precedes the apolytikion (troparion of the day), and is chanted in the tone of the week. While the Typicon (book of rubrics) prescribes that the verses should be chanted by the canonarch standing in the center of the nave, in the Byzantine practice the verses are intoned by the psalmist. In common Slavic practice they are chanted by the deacon standing before the icon of Christ on the iconostasis; if there is no deacon, the verses are commonly read by the priest.

== Text ==
The order of Theos Kyrios, as served at Matins is as follows:

Canonarch: [In the tone of the proceeding troparion:] God is the Lord and hath revealed himself unto us. Blessed is he that cometh in the name of the Lord.

Verse 1: O give thanks unto the Lord, for He is good, for His mercy endureth for ever. (Ps. 117:1; Greek practice, Ps. 104.1: O give thanks unto the Lord, and call upon His holy name.)

Chanters: God is the Lord and hath revealed himself unto us. Blessed is he that cometh in the name of the Lord.

Canonarch (Verse 2): Surrounding me they compassed me, and by the name of the Lord I warded them off. (Ps. 117:11)

Chanters: God is the Lord and hath revealed himself unto us. Blessed is he that cometh in the name of the Lord.

Canonarch (Verse 3): I shall not die but live, and I shall tell of the works of the Lord. (Ps. 117:17)

Chanters: God is the Lord and hath revealed himself unto us. Blessed is he that cometh in the name of the Lord.

Canonarch (Verse 4): The stone which the builders rejected, the same is become the head of the corner. This is the Lord's doing, and it is marvellous in our eyes. (Ps. 117:22)

Chanters: God is the Lord and hath revealed himself unto us. Blessed is he that cometh in the name of the Lord.

They then begin immediately to chant the troparia of the day and the corresponding Theotokion.

== Substitutions ==
=== Lenten weekdays ===
On weekdays during Great Lent, Theos Kyrios is replaced by Alleluia. In some places this substitution also occurs on certain weekdays during the lesser fasting seasons: Nativity Fast, Dormition Fast and the Apostles' Fast. This substitution takes place on any day when the order of services follows the Lenten format, for which reason such days are referred to as "days with Alleluia". On days with Alleluia, the deacon does not normally serve, so the verses are usually chanted by the priest (according to the Typicon, the canonarch).

The order of the Lenten Alleluia is as follows:

Canonarch: Alleluia in the day's tone. Verse 1: Out of the night my spirit waketh at dawn unto Thee, O God, for Thy commandments are a light upon the earth.

Chanters: Alleluia, alleluia, alleluia.

Canonarch (Verse 2): Learn righteousness, ye that dwell upon the earth.

Chanters: Alleluia, alleluia, alleluia.

Canonarch (Verse 3): Zeal shall lay hold upon an uninstructed people.

Chanters: Alleluia, alleluia, alleluia.

Canonarch (Verse 4): Add more evils upon them, O Lord, add more evils upon them that are glorious upon the earth.

Chanters: Alleluia, alleluia, alleluia.

They then begin immediately to chant the Triadicon (hymns to the Trinity), the main text of which differs according to the tone of the week (see Octoechos (liturgy)), and the ending of which differs according to the day of the week (see Weekly cycle).

=== Saturdays of the dead ===
A different Alleluia is chanted on memorial Saturdays throughout the year. Most of these occur on Saturdays during Great Lent, but there are several others throughout the year as well. This Alleluia is always chanted in the eighth tone (Greek usage: fourth plagal tone), though it may be chanted to a special funeral melody.

Canonarch: Alleluia in the eighth tone. Verse 1: Blessed are they whom Thou has taken to Thyself, O Lord.

Chanters: Alleluia, alleluia, alleluia.

Canonarch (Verse 2): Their remembrance is unto generation and generation.

Chanters: Alleluia, alleluia, alleluia.

Canonarch (Verse 3): Their souls shall dwell among good things

Chanters: Alleluia, alleluia, alleluia.

They then begin immediately to chant the troparia of the dead:

O Thou Who by the depth of Thy wisdom dost provide all things out of love for man, and grantest unto all that which is profitable, O only Creator: Grant rest, O Lord, to the soul(s) of Thy servant(s); for in Thee hath he (she)(have they) placed his (her)(their) hope, O our Creator and Fashioner and God.
Glory to the Father, and to the Son, and to the Holy Spirit, both now and ever, and unto the ages of ages. Amen.
Theotokion: In thee we have a wall and a have, and an intercessor acceptable to God Whom thou didst bear, O Theotokos unwedded, salvation of the faithful.

The same format is followed in the Panikhida (requiem service).
