= Ejaculatory prayer =

Very short prayer

In Christian piety, an ejaculation, sometimes known as ejaculatory prayer or aspiration, is "a short prayer, in which the mind is directed to God, on any emergency." "A sigh, a devout aspiration, a holy ejaculation, will oftener pierce the sky, and reach the ear of Omnipotence, than a long set exercise of prayer..."

Within Roman Catholicism, some common ejaculations include the Jesus Prayer (more frequently used in Eastern Orthodoxy), the Fatima Prayer of the Holy Rosary, Come Holy Spirit, and Eternal Rest. In Methodism, some common ejaculations include "Praise the Lord!", "Hallelujah!" and "Amen!" The Puritan theologian William Perkins urged his pupils to "pray continually" through "secret and inward ejaculations of the heart". The Lutheran rite for corporate Confession and Absolution includes the pastor offering ejaculatory prayers after penitents recite the Confiteor.

Ejaculatory prayers have been used for indulgences, decreasing the number of days spent in purgatory. They are collected in the Enchiridion Indulgentiarum. The Raccolta (1866 version) states that "these prayers may be said in any language, provided the version be correct, and approved by the S. C. of Indulgences."

The following is a prayer consisting of two parts, given in the Raccolta (1943 version):

a) Holy God, Holy Strong One, Holy Immortal One, have mercy on us. b) To Thee be praise, to Thee be glory, to Thee be thanksgiving through endless ages, O Blessed Trinity (Roman Missal).

According to the Raccolta, it grants a partial indulgence of 500 days, for each complete recitation, even if the two parts are recited separately. If recited daily with devotion for an entire month, it grants a plenary indulgence.
