= Martin Bernigeroth =

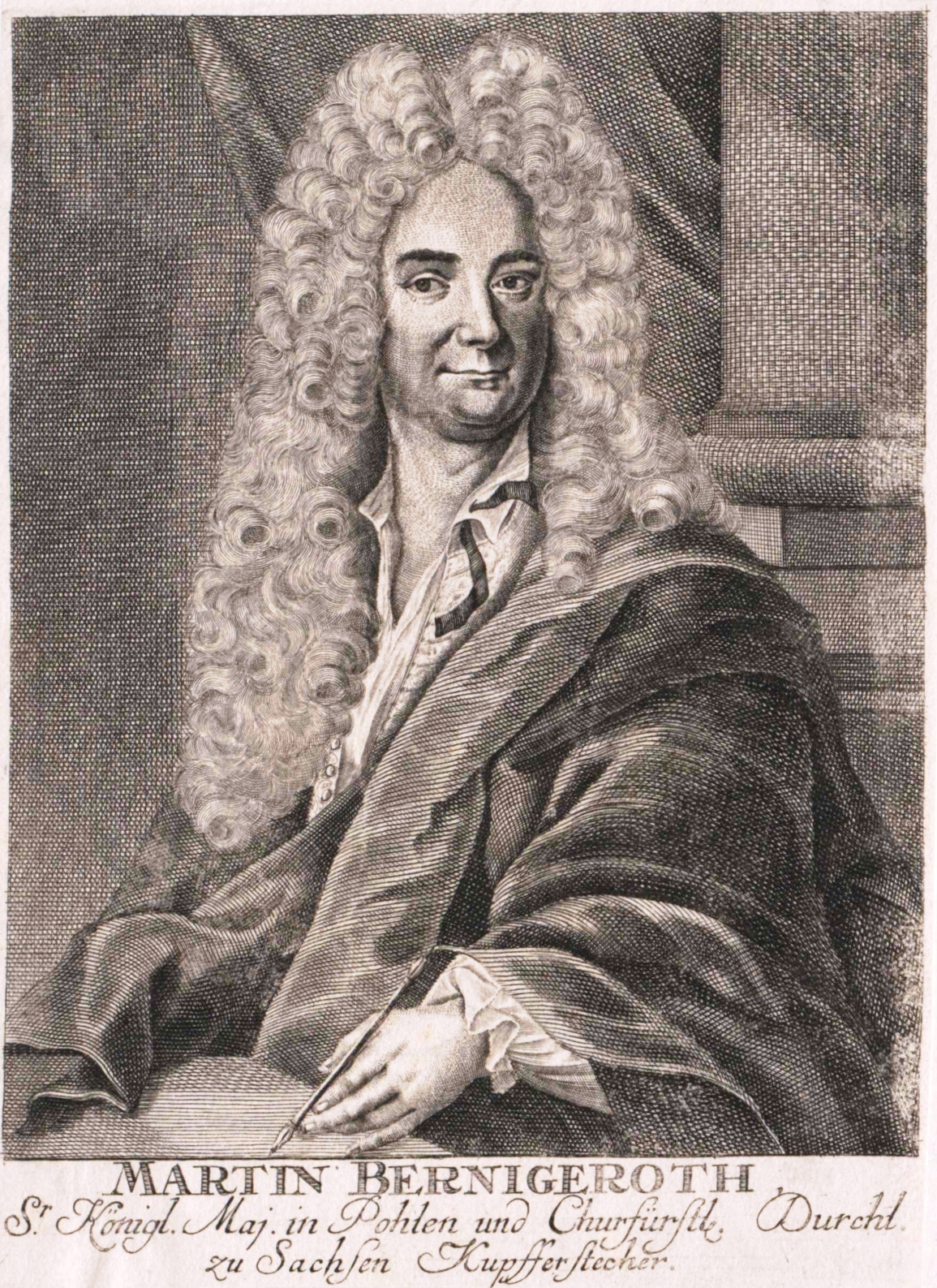
- Self-portrait
- Born: 1670; Friesdorf, Saxony
- Died: 6 June 1733 (aged 62–63); Leipzig, Saxony
- Known for: Etcher and copper engraver
- Movement: Baroque

Martin Bernigeroth (Friesdorf, 1670 – Leipzig, 6 June 1733) was a German copper engraver.

== Life ==
Bernigeroth was born Friesdorf, a village in the Saxon portion of the County of Mansfeld. He was the founder of a family of copper engravers based in Leipzig. He arrived in Leipzig in 1685 and was trained in the household of the copper engraver Erasmus Andresohn (1651–1731). He soon founded his own workshop, specialising in portraiture. In 1690–91, he studied mathematics and geometry at Leipzig University, and in 1707, he was appointed as an electoral copper engraver. Bernigeroth died in Leipzig on 6 June 1733. His sons, Johann Martin (1713–1767) and Johann Benedict (1716–1764), were also active as copper engravers. His pupils included, among others, Christian Heckel, Johann Christoph Sysang and Johann Christian Marchand.

== Work ==
A prolific artist, Bernigeroth stands as the preeminent figure in 18th-century Leipzig portrait engraving. He is credited with approximately 1,600 engraved portraits. His clientele, which spanned all the upper echelons of society, extended well beyond the borders of Saxony and Thuringia. A collection of prints by the Bernigeroths, bound in eight volumes, is held in the Kupferstich-Kabinett, Dresden.

== Gallery ==
Johann Burchard Mencke

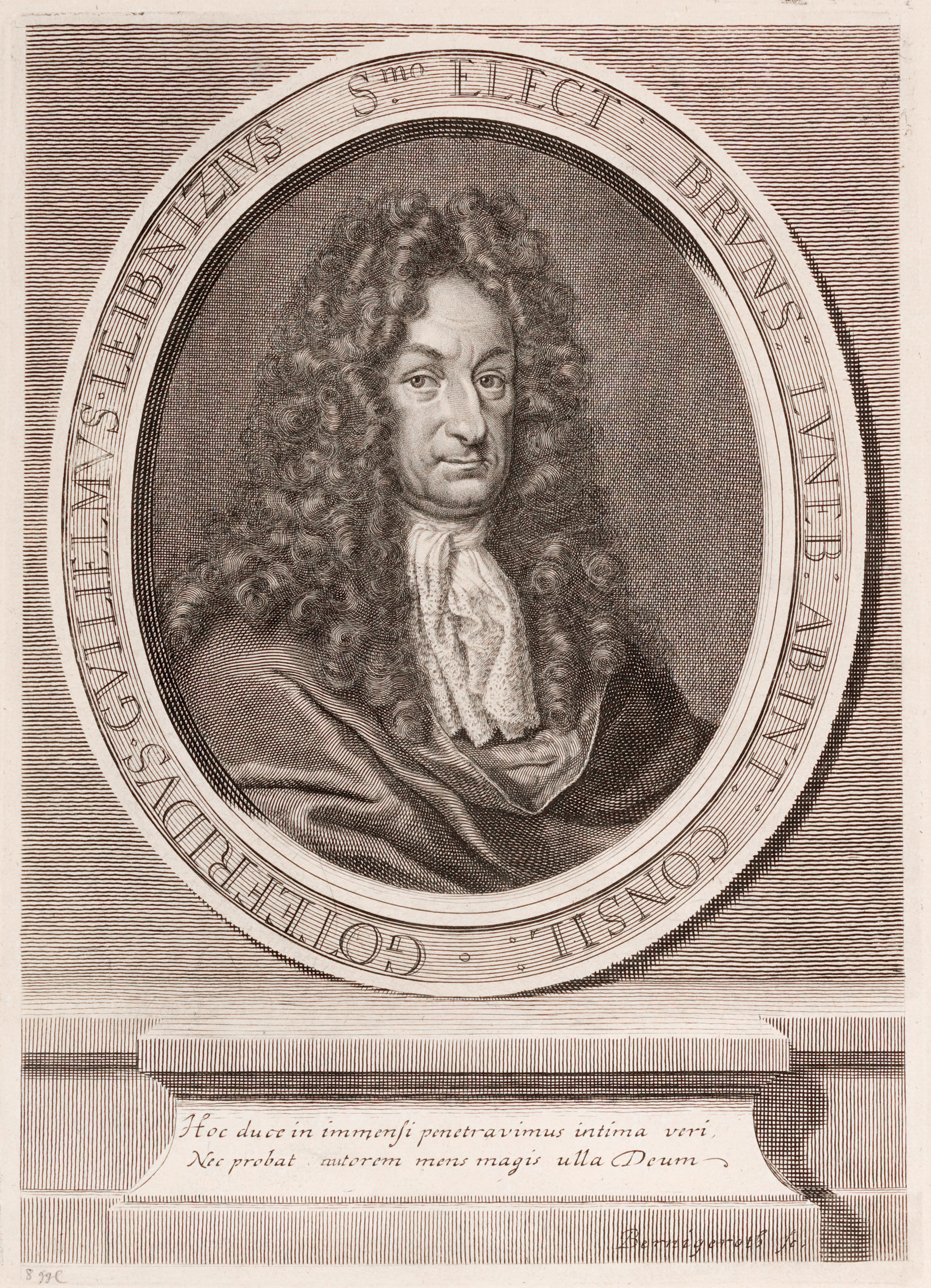
Gottfried Wilhelm Leibniz

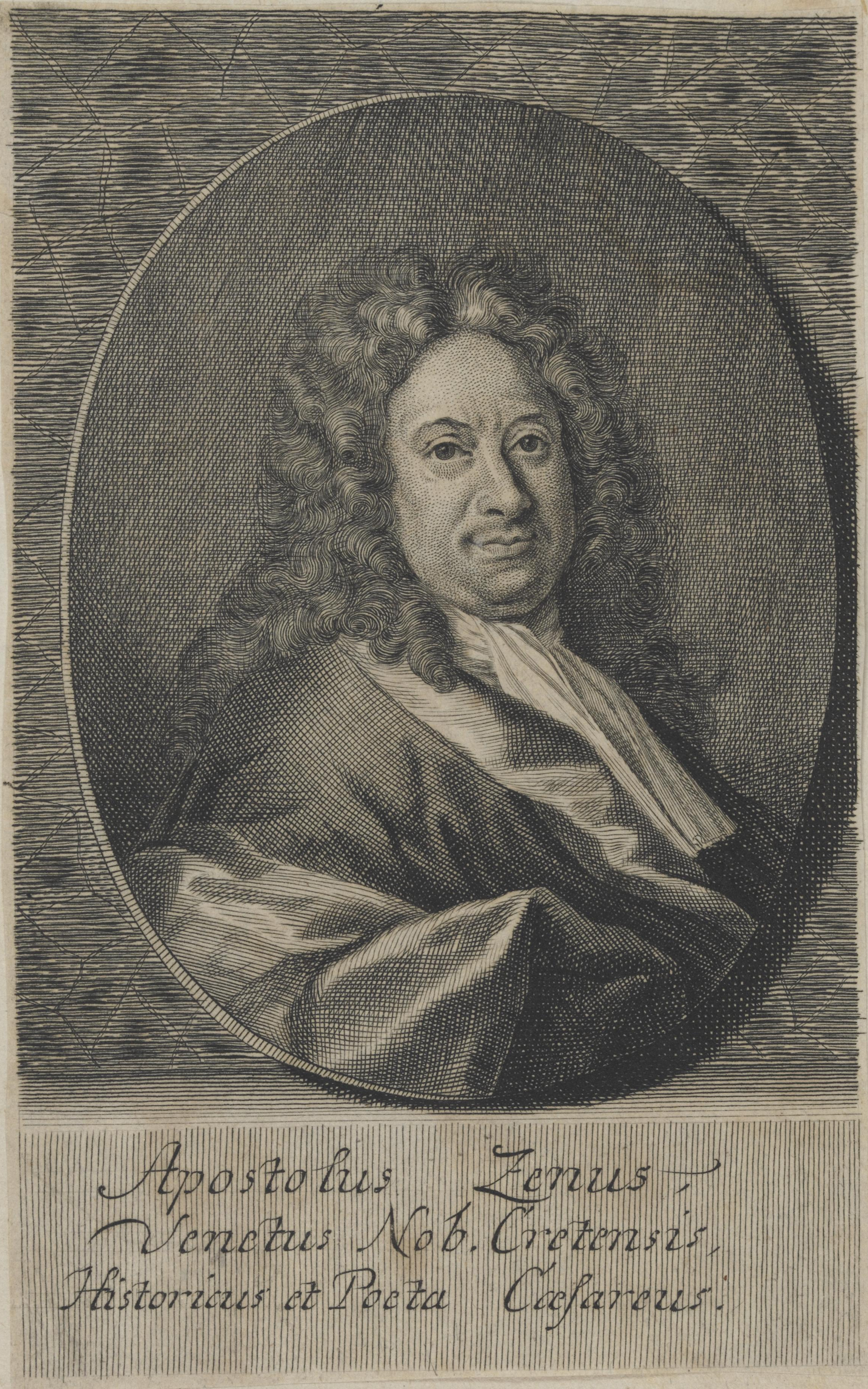
Apostolo Zeno

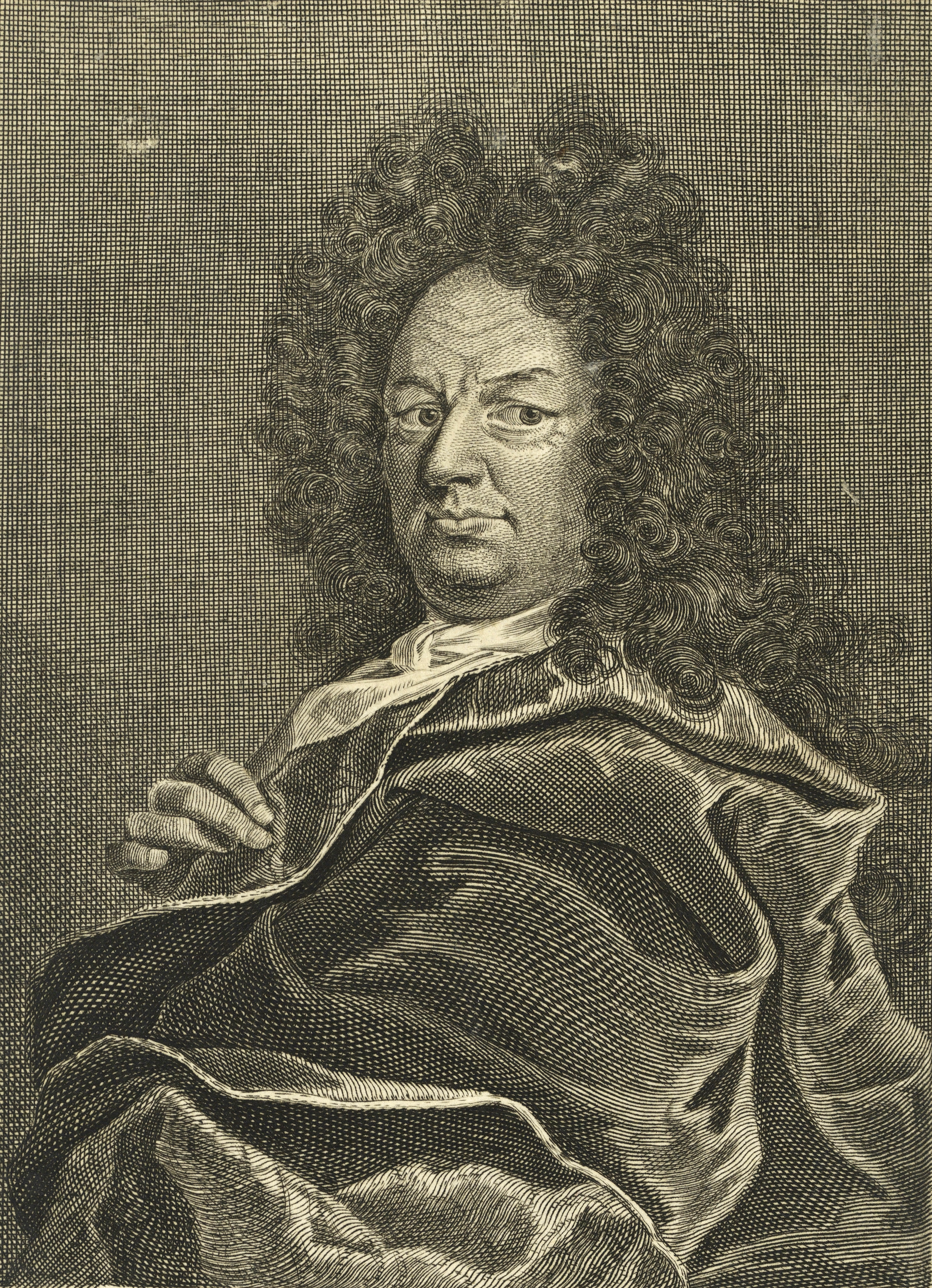
Carl Piper

Christoph Wolle

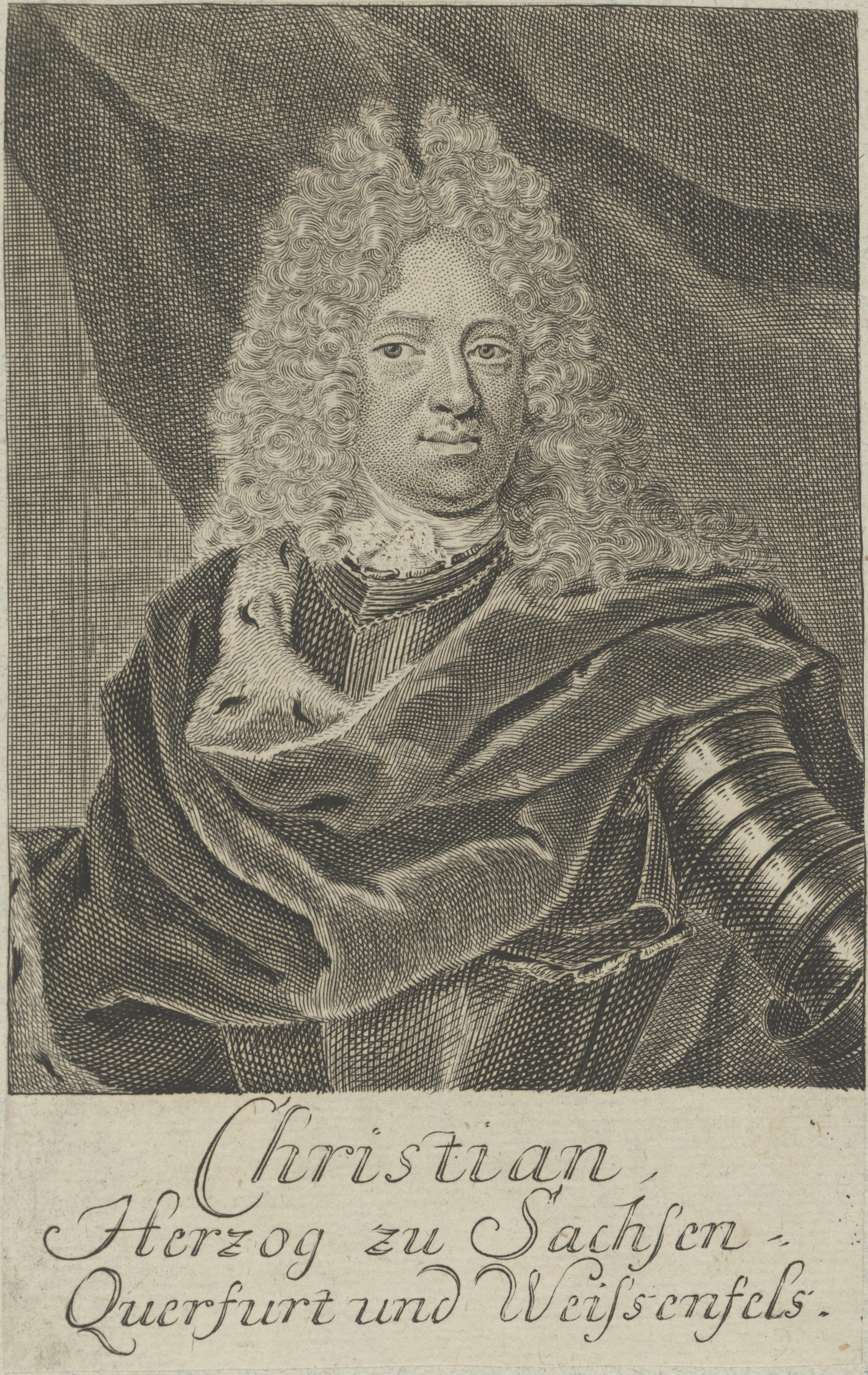
Christian, Duke of Saxe-Weissenfels

Joannes Schilter

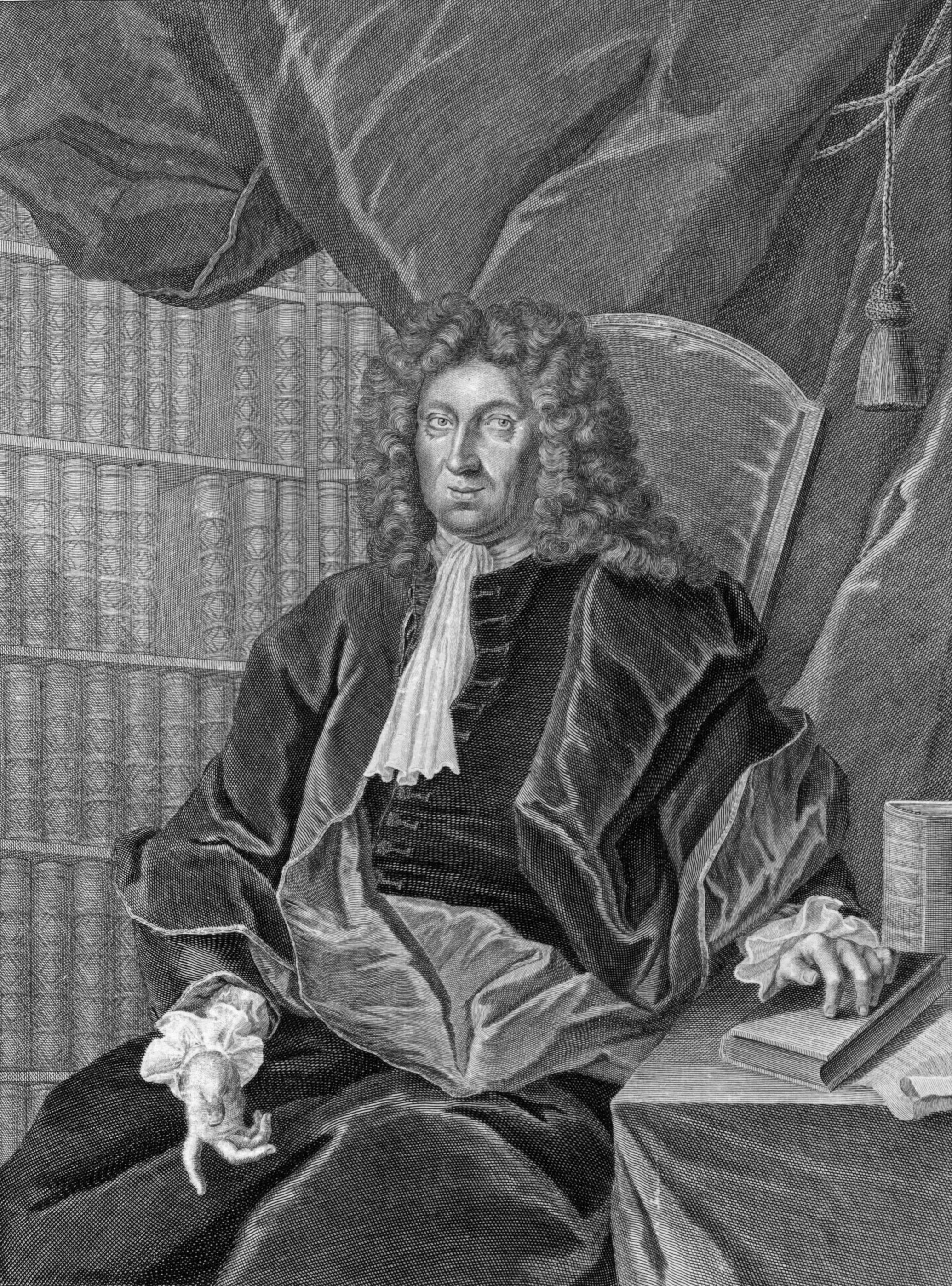
Johann Heinrich Ernesti

== Bibliography ==
- Johann Friedrich Ludwig Theodor Merzdorf (1875). "Bernigeroth, Martin" . Allgemeine Deutsche Biographie (in German). Vol. 2. Leipzig: Duncker & Humblot. p. 466.
- Bruno Sauer (1955). "Bernigeroth, Martin". Neue Deutsche Biographie (in German). Vol. 2. Berlin: Duncker & Humblot. pp. 126–127. (full text online).
