= Komm, Heiliger Geist, Herre Gott =

Lutheran hymn for Pentecost

- Hymn by Martin Luther
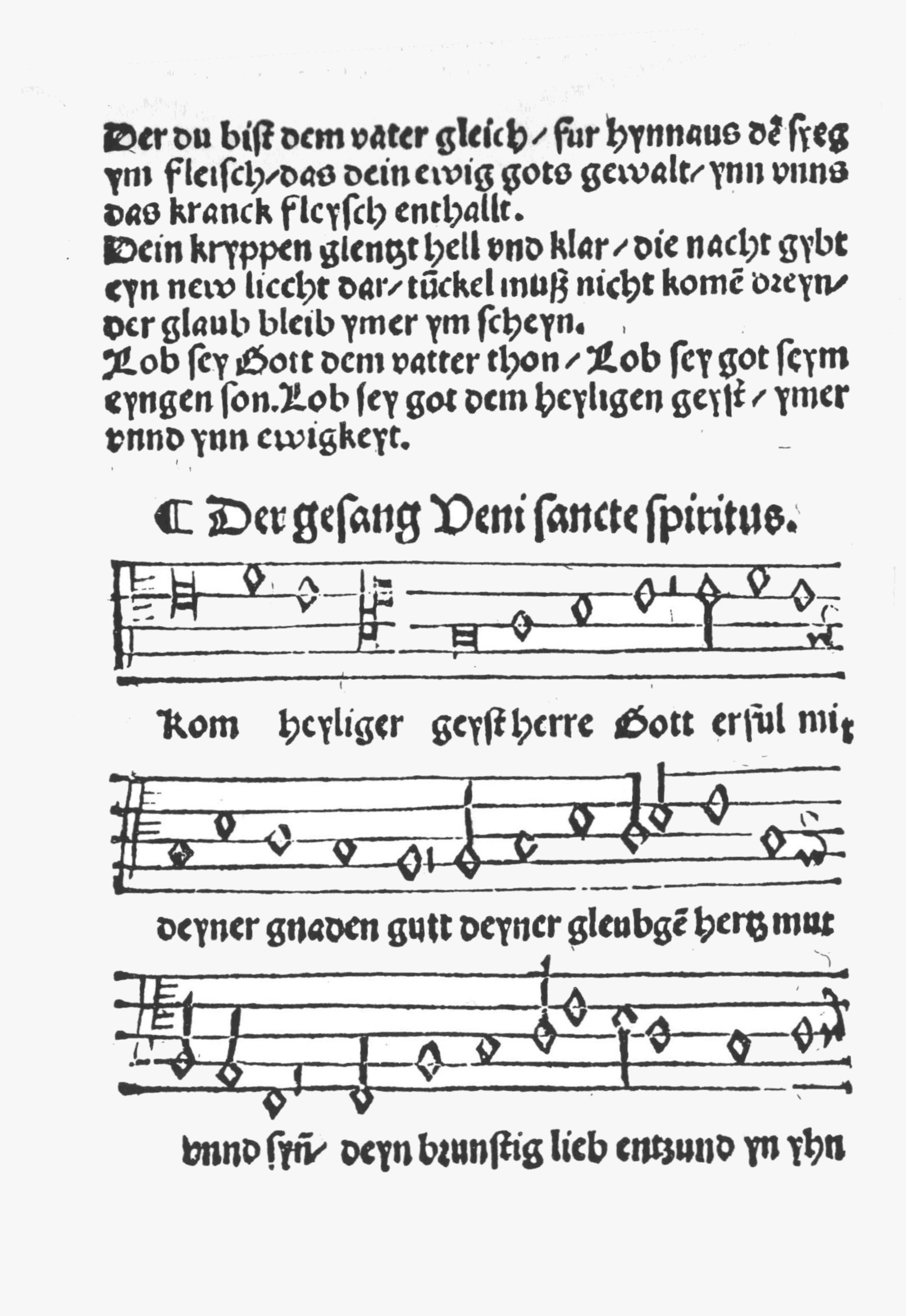
- In the Erfurt Enchiridion, 1524 (first of three pages)
- English: "Come, Holy Spirit, God and Lord"
- Catalogue: Zahn 7445a–b
- Text: by Martin Luther
- Language: German
- Based on: "Veni Sancte Spiritus, reple tuorum corda fidelium"
- Published: 1524
- Tune

"Komm, Heiliger Geist, Herre Gott" ("Come, Holy Ghost, Lord God") is a Lutheran hymn for Pentecost, with words written by Martin Luther based on "Veni Sancte Spiritus, reple tuorum corda fidelium". The hymn in three stanzas was first published in 1524. For centuries the chorale has been the prominent hymn (Hauptlied) for Pentecost in German-speaking Lutheranism. Johann Sebastian Bach used it in several chorale preludes, cantatas and his motet Der Geist hilft unser Schwachheit auf, BWV 226.

The hymn inspired composers from |the Renaissance to contemporary to write chorale preludes and vocal compositions. It has been translated, for example by Catherine Winkworth as "Come, Holy Spirit, God and Lord" in 1855, and has appeared in hymnals of various denominations.

The artist Hans Holbein the Younger featured the hymn in the painting The Ambassadors.

== Text ==
The first stanza is an anonymous translation of the Latin antiphon for Pentecost "Veni Sancte Spiritus, reple tuorum corda fidelium" (Come, Holy Spirit, fill the hearts of your faithful) from the 11th century. The German version appeared with the current tune in Ebersberg in c. 1480. The stanza has nine lines, with the irregular meter 7.8.8.8.8.8.8.10.8. It opens with requesting the Holy Spirit to come. An acclamation "O Herr" (O Lord) begins the central fifth line, and the thoughts culminate in a double Hallelujah in the last line. The Spirit is asked: "fill with the goodness of your grace / the heart, spirit and mind of your believers, / kindle in them your ardent love!"

Martin Luther added two more stanzas. He kept not only the meter and the tune, but also the structure, with acclamations at the beginning of lines 1 and 5, and the final Halleluja. In his stanzas, the group of "deiner Gläubigen" (your believers) is speaking directly, pronouncing "wir" and "uns" ("we" and "us"). Luther alludes to several of the seven gifts of the Holy Spirit, according to Isaiah 11:2: wisdom, understanding, counsel, knowledge, fortitude, piety, and fear of the Lord. He also drew on Galatians 4:6 ("because ye are sons, God hath sent forth the Spirit of his Son into your hearts"), Matthew 23:8-10 ("for one is your Master"), and Romans 8:26 ("the Spirit also helpeth our infirmities").

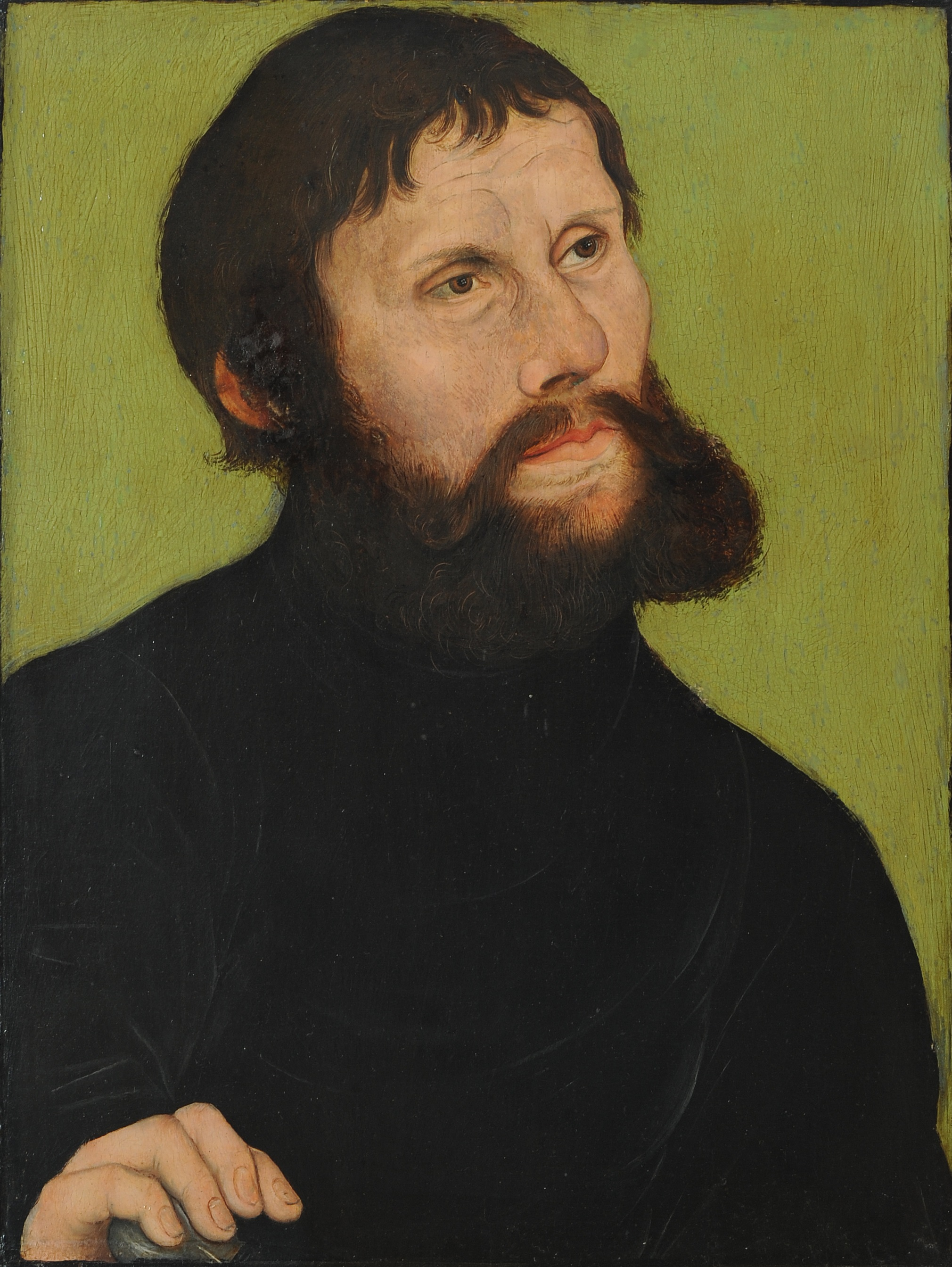
Martin Luther by Lucas Cranach, 1521

In the second stanza, Luther uses the attributes "heiliges Licht, edler Hort" (holy light, precious refuge) and words the request "protect us from strange doctrines / so that we may never look for any teacher / except Jesus in true belief". In the last stanza, the Spirit's "ardent love" and "sweet consolation" are named, asking for help "always to remain joyful and comforted / in your service" and "so that we may bravely struggle / through life and death to reach you!"

The hymn appeared first in 1524 in Eyn geystlich Gesangk Buchleyn, (booklet of spiritual song), collected by Johann Walter. The same year it appeared also in Eyn Enchiridion in Erfurt, titled "Der gesank Veni sancte spiritus". For centuries the chorale has been the prominent hymn (Hauptlied) for Pentecost in German-speaking Lutheranism, the number in the current hymnal Evangelisches Gesangbuch (EG) is 125.

The hymn was translated to Swedish first in 1567, "Kom Helge Ande Herre Gudh", and has appeared in a 1983 version by Britt G. Hallqvist in Den svenska psalmboken 1986 (The Swedish 1986 hymnal). The song was translated to English by Catherine Winkworth as "Come, Holy Spirit, God and Lord!", published in the first series of Lyra Germanica in 1855, among others. It has been used in different translations, appearing in hymnals of various denominations.

== Tune and musical settings ==
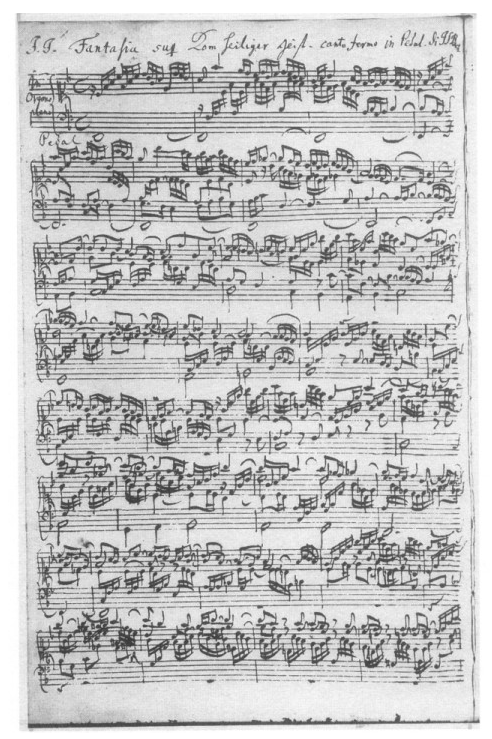
First page of Bach's autograph of BWV 651

The anonymous melody, Zahn No. 7445a, is similar to the tune of the hymn "Adesto, sancte spiritus" by Marchetto di Padua (c. 1270). Early settings were by Heinrich Faber, for five voices, and by Johann Walter, for four voices. The tune, which also exists in a slightly different form from the 1530s (Zahn No. 7445b), was set for several parts by Arnold von Bruck and Samuel Scheidt. Johann Eccard composed a five-part motet.

Dieterich Buxtehude wrote a chorale prelude, BuxWV 199. Chorale preludes were also written by Heinrich Scheidemann, Nicolaus Hasse, Andreas Nicolaus Vetter, Georg Friedrich Kauffmann, Johann Gottfried Walther and Johann Ludwig Krebs.

Johann Sebastian Bach composed two chorale preludes which he made part of his collection Great Eighteen Chorale Preludes, Fantasia super Komm, Heiliger Geist, canto fermo in Pedale, BWV 651, and Komm, Heiliger Geist, alio modo a 2 Clav. e Pedale, BWV 652.

Bach quoted the tune instrumentally as the cantus firmus in a duet of his first cantata for Pentecost Erschallet, ihr Lieder, erklinget, ihr Saiten! BWV 172 (1714). He used the first stanza as movement 3 in his cantata for Pentecost Wer mich liebet, der wird mein Wort halten, BWV 59 (1723 or 1724), and the third stanza as the closing chorale of his funeral motet addressing the Holy Spirit, Der Geist hilft unser Schwachheit auf, BWV 226 (1729).

Other vocal compositions have included two masses on the tune by Georg Philipp Telemann for four parts and basso continuo, and motets by Moritz Hauptmann, August Eduard Grell, Arnold Mendelssohn (1921), Hans Humpert (1932) and Rudolf Petzold (1957).

Max Reger quotes the tune in the Pentecost section of his organ pieces Sieben Stücke, Op. 145.
