= Praise the Lord =

Praise the Lord may refer to:

- Praise the Lord (greeting), a salutation used among Christians
- Praise the Lord (album), a 1972 album by Wanda Jackson
- Praise the Lord (film), a 2014 Malayalam film
- Praise (TV program), formerly known as Praise the Lord, a Christian TV program of the Trinity Broadcasting Network
- "Praise the Lord (Da Shine)", a 2018 song by ASAP Rocky featuring Skepta from album Testing
- "Praise the Lord (Breland song)", a 2022 song by Breland

== See also ==
- "Praise the Lord and Pass the Ammunition", an American patriotic song by Frank Loesser
