= Johann Heinrich Ernesti =

Saxon philosopher, Lutheran theologian, Latin classicist and poet

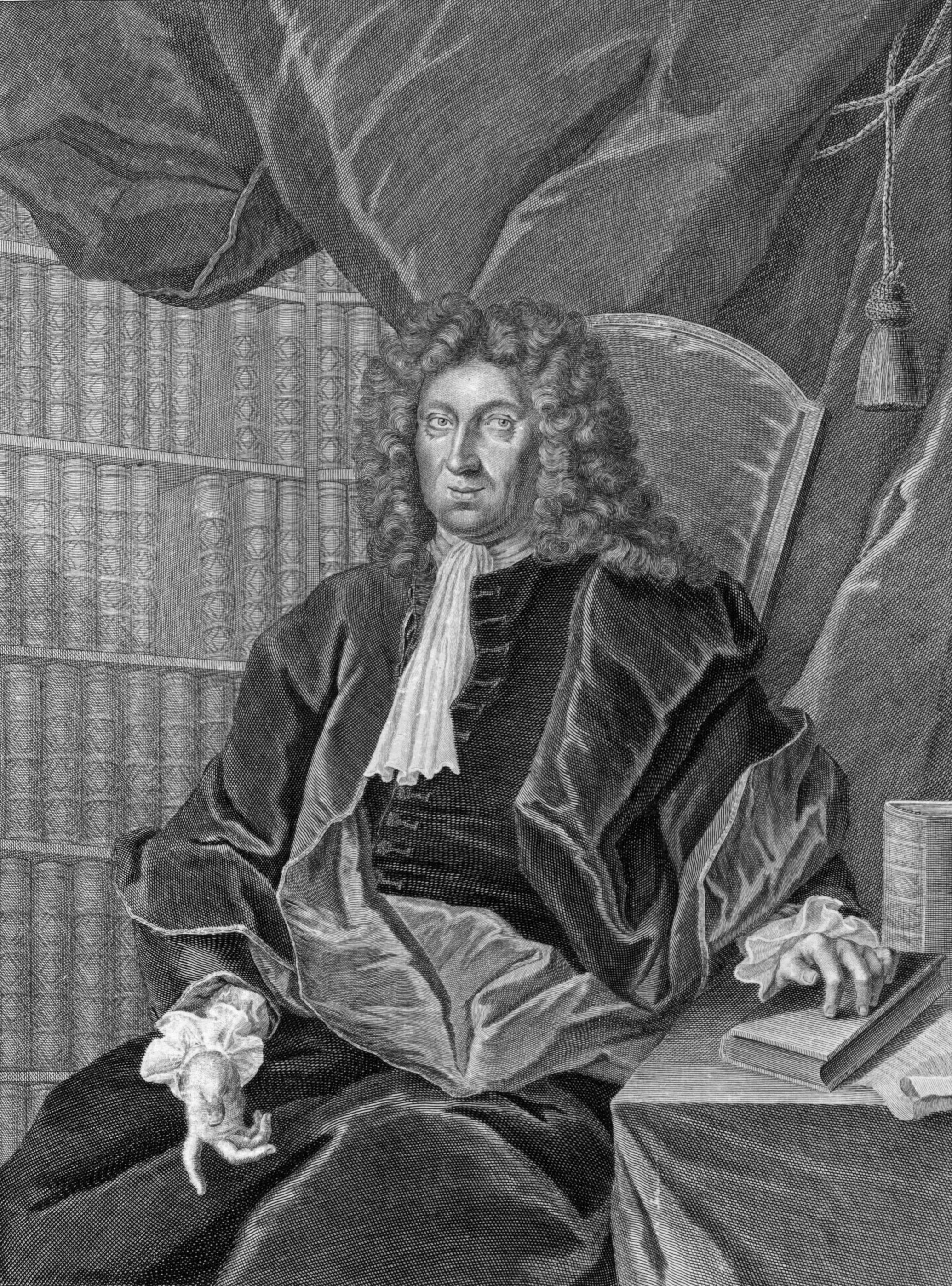
- Engraved portrait of Johann Heinrich Ernesti by Martin Bernigeroth
- Born: 12 March 1652; Königsfeld, Saxony
- Died: 16 October 1729 (aged 77); Leipzig, Saxony
- Occupations: Philosopher, Lutheran theologian, Latin classicist and poet
- Employers: Leipzig University; St. Thomas School, Leipzig

Academic background
- Education: Leipzig University

Johann Heinrich Ernesti (/ɛərˈnɛsti/; German: [ɛʁˈnɛsti]; 12 March 1652 – 16 October 1729) was a German philosopher, Lutheran theologian, Latin classicist and poet. He was rector of the Thomasschule, and Professor of Poetry at Leipzig University. He gained fame through his writings on Cicero.

== Life ==
Ernesti was born in Königsfeld (Saxony), the son of the preacher Daniel Ernesti. He received his first lessons from his father, who was a Königsfeld rector. Later, he attended high school in Altenburg under his cousin Jacob Daniel Ernesti. From 1670, he studied theology and philosophy at the University of Leipzig, where he became Baccalaureus in 1672, and in 1674 Master of Philosophy.

In 1680 he was appointed as an assessor at the Faculty of Arts of the University. Furthermore, he worked until 1682 as a Saturday preacher at the Church of St. Nicholas. He was conrector (vice-principal) from 1680 and from 1684 to 1729 rector (principal) of the Thomasschule, succeeding Jacob Thomasius. He introduced a new education policy, including allowing school prayer in German. He served for 45 years, the longest term of office of all known principals. His successor was the influential Johann Matthias Gesner.

From 1691 Ernesti was professor of poetry at the University of Leipzig. He taught about Roman poets Horace, Ovid, Juvenal and Virgil and also more recent Latin writers such as Helius Eobanus Hessus. Ernesti himself was active as a writer, his output included panegyrics. His most important work was 14 Selectarum Orationum Liber (Marcus Tullius Cicero).

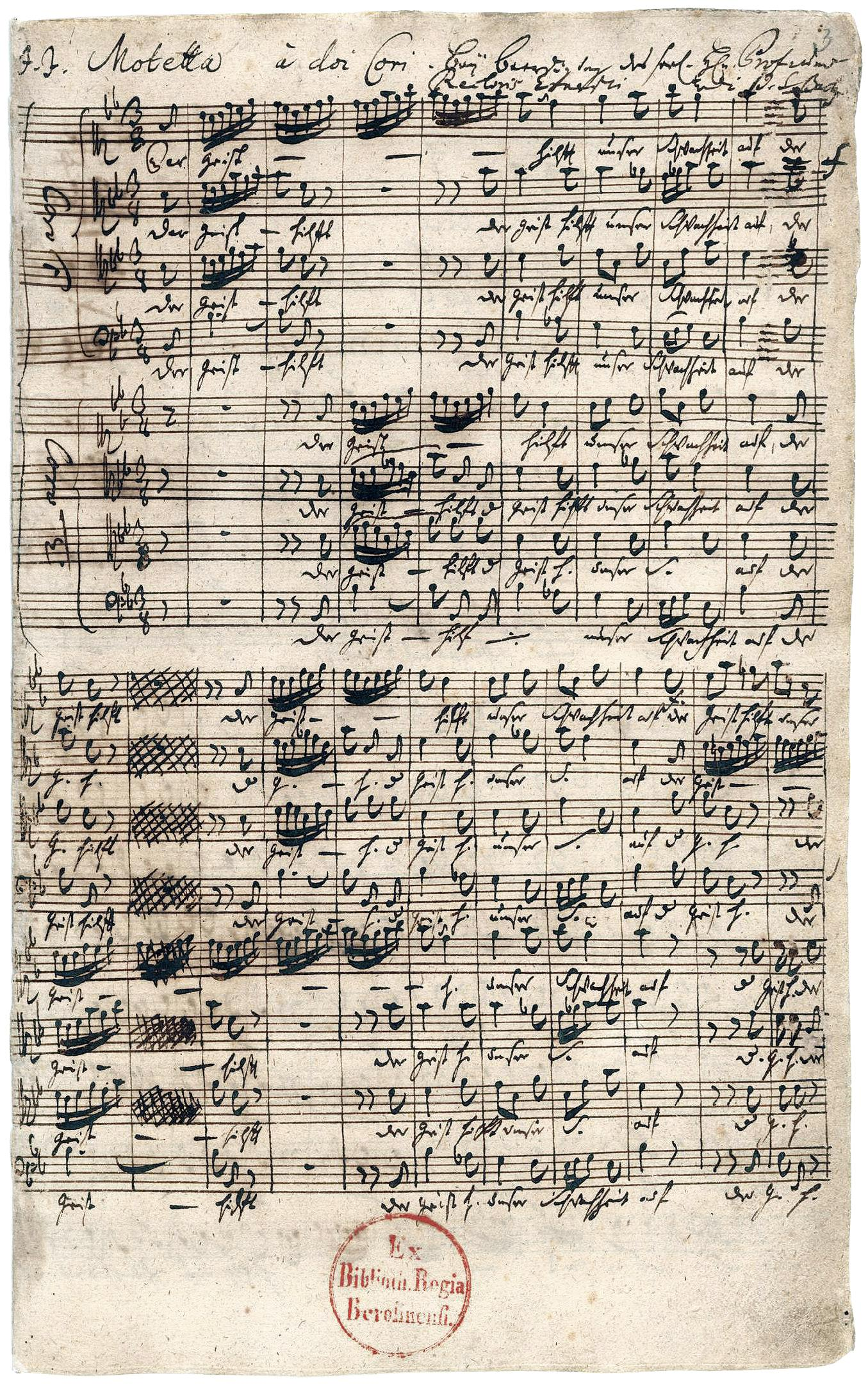
Autograph of Bach's motet Der Geist hilft unser Schwachheit auf, BWV 226, composed in 1729 for the funeral of Ernesti

When composer Johann Sebastian Bach applied for the post of cantor (choirmaster) in 1723, Ernesti was the rector of the school.

Ernesti died on 16 October 1729 in Leipzig.

For the memorial service for Ernesti's death held on 21 October 1729 in the Paulinerkirche, the university church, Bach composed the motet Der Geist hilft unser Schwachheit auf, BWV 226.

== Works ==
- Centuria evangeliorum ad usum scholasticum exactorum, 1687.
- De usu profanarum litterarum in interpretandis scripturis sacris, 1688.
- De usu sacrarum litterarum in interpretandis scriptoribus profanis, 1689.
- Dissert. acad. de pharisaeismis in libris profanorum scriptorum occurrentibus, 1690.
- De orationibus in libris N. T. historicis, 1692.
- De Regulo, 1694.
- Historiae rerum sacrarum et profanarum parallelae, 1694–96.
- Cornelius Nepos per epistolas scribens, 1698.
- Misnia Romana, 1698.
- Compendium hermoneuticae profanae s. de legendis scriptoribus profanis praecepta nonnulla, 1699.
- Commentatio, 1700.
- Orationes de professoribus oratoriis, 1702.
- De prof. ethicis, 1702.
- De professoribus poeticis, 1702.
- De prof. dialecticis et logicis, 1703.
- De sportula Romanorum quotidiana, 1703.
- ὈρνιθογραΦία Ovidiana, 1705.
- Commentationes novae in Cornelium Nepotem. Justinum, Terentium, Plautum, Curtium et poesim barbaricam, 1707/38.
- Commentatio in res philosophicas seculares, 1709.
- Paralipomena, 1711.
- Historia rerum Lipsicarum metrica, 1712.
- Observationes poeticae de genere carminum didactico et versu rhythmico, 1714.
- Usurpata a Curtio in particulis latinitas, 1719.
- De latente in fabulis poeticis divina veritate, 1722.
- Accedunt Praefatio et Indices. Bearbeitungen von Gottlob Benedikt von Schirach, Buchhandlung des Waisenhauses, Halle 1746.
- 14 Selectarum Orationum Liber. Buchhandlung des Waisenhauses, Halle 1822.

== Bibliography ==
- Leontsky, Jan (2011). Bach contre Ernesti, l'étrange querelle [Bach against Ernesti, the strange quarrel] (in French). Tarnhelm Ed.
