= Alle Psallite Cum Luya =

Audio recording of Alle Psallite Cum Luya; vocals by Ozan Karagöz

Scan of two pages from the Montpellier Codex containing the motet Alle Psallite Cum Luya.

Alle Psallite Cum Luya is an anonymous three-part Latin motet from the late 13th or early 14th century. It is recorded in the Montpellier Codex and is thought to have originated in France. The text is based on the word Alleluia, which is repeated throughout in the tenor voice while the duplum (second) and triplum (third) voices sing lines with successively longer tropes inserted between alle and luya, as follows:

Alle psallite cum luya
Alle concrepando psallite cum luya
Alle corde voto Deo toto, psallite cum luya
Alleluya

Alle (sing with) luya
Alle (resounding loudly sing with) luya
Alle (with heart devoted all to God sing with) luya
Alleluya

The troped text builds up to the enthusiastic affirmation "Resounding loudly sing with heart devoted all to God with Alleluya", giving the piece a celebratory tone.

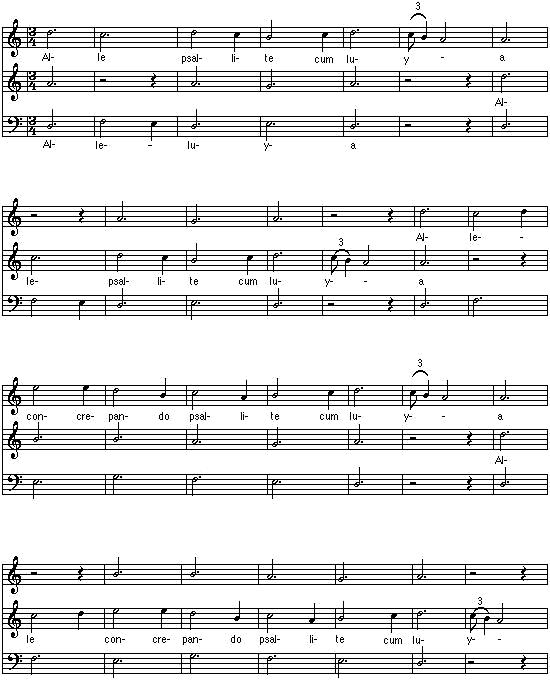
Sheet music page 1

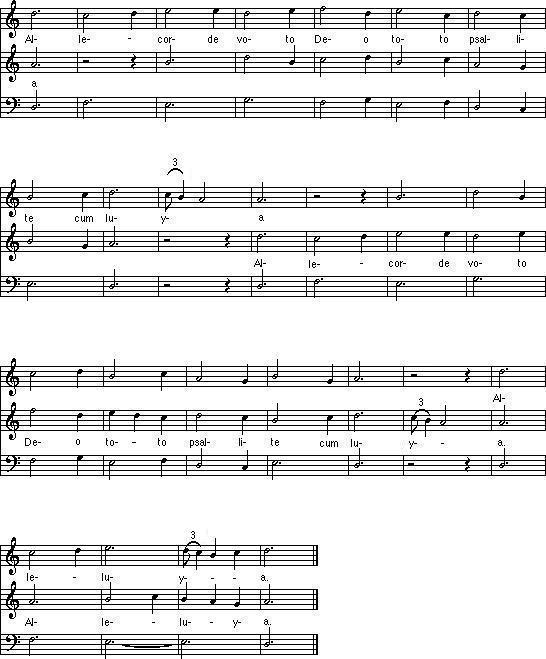
Sheet music page 2
