= Friedrich Wilhelm Leopold Pfeil =

German forester

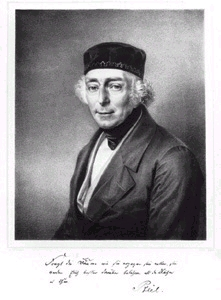
Friedrich Wilhelm Leopold Pfeil

Friedrich Wilhelm Leopold Pfeil (28 March 1783 – 4 September 1859) was a German forester.

Pfeil was born in Rammelburg. From 1801 onward, he trained and worked as a forester at several sites in the Harz region, Neuchâtel and Silesia. As a soldier in the Napoleonic Wars he fought at the Battles of Großbeeren and Wartenburg. From 1816 he was employed as a forester in the service of Heinrich Karl Erdmann, prince of Carolath-Beuthen. In 1821 he was awarded an honorary doctorate at the University of Berlin, and despite lacking a university education, was named a professor of forest science. In 1830 when the department of forestry was relocated to Eberswalde, he was named its director, a position he maintained up until his retirement in 1859.

From 1822 to 1859 he was editor of the journal Kritische Blätter für Forst- und Jagdwissenschaft — after his death, Hermann von Nördlinger continued as its editor. Pfeil died in Warmbrunn. From 1863 to 2005 the "Wilhelm-Leopold-Pfeil-Preis" was awarded for contributions made towards future forest management in Europe.

== Selected works ==
- Grundsätze der Forstwirthschaft in bezug auf die Nationalökonomie und die Staatsfinanzwissenschaft, 1822 – Principles of forestry management in regards to the national economy and state finances.
- Forstbenutzung und Forsttechnologie, 1831 – Forestry and forest technology.
- Kurze Anweisung zur Jagdwissenschaft für Gutsbesitzer und Forstliebhaber, 1831 – Brief instruction on the science of hunting.
- Neue vollständige Anleitung zur Behandling, Benutzung und Schätzung der Forsten; ein Handbuch für Forstbesitzer und Forstbeamte, (5 volumes, 1830–33) – New comprehensive guide on the treatment, use and estimation of forests.
- Die Forstpolizeigesetze Deutschlands und Frankreichs nach ihren grundsätzen, 1834 – The German and French forestry regulation system.
- Das forstliche verhalten der deutschen waldbaume und ihre erziehung, 1839 – Characteristics of German forest trees.
- Die Forstwirthschaft nach rein praktischer Ansicht; ein Handbuch fur Privatforstbesitzer, Verwalter und ins besondere fur Forstlehrlinge, (2nd edition, 1839) – Forest management from a practical viewpoint.
- Forstschutz und Forstpolizeilehre, im Anhange die Nachweisung der preussischen Forstpolizeigesetze (2nd edition, 1845) – Forestry and forestry regulation.
- Die Forsttaxation in ihrem ganzen Umfange, (3rd edition, 1838).
