= Canonarch =

Lead cantor in Eastern Christian churches of the Byzantine tradition

A canonarch is a lead cantor, or reader, in Eastern Christian churches of the Byzantine tradition. The canonarch ensures that other readers chant from the correct texts and use the proper tones. The canonarch preserves the canonical order in the liturgical services through proper use of the Typicon.

The canonarch also reads the verses of the prokeimenon and related texts. In some churches many of the duties of the canonarch are assumed by deacon, such as chanting the verses of Theos Kyrios.
