= Montpellier Codex =

Source of 13th-century French polyphony

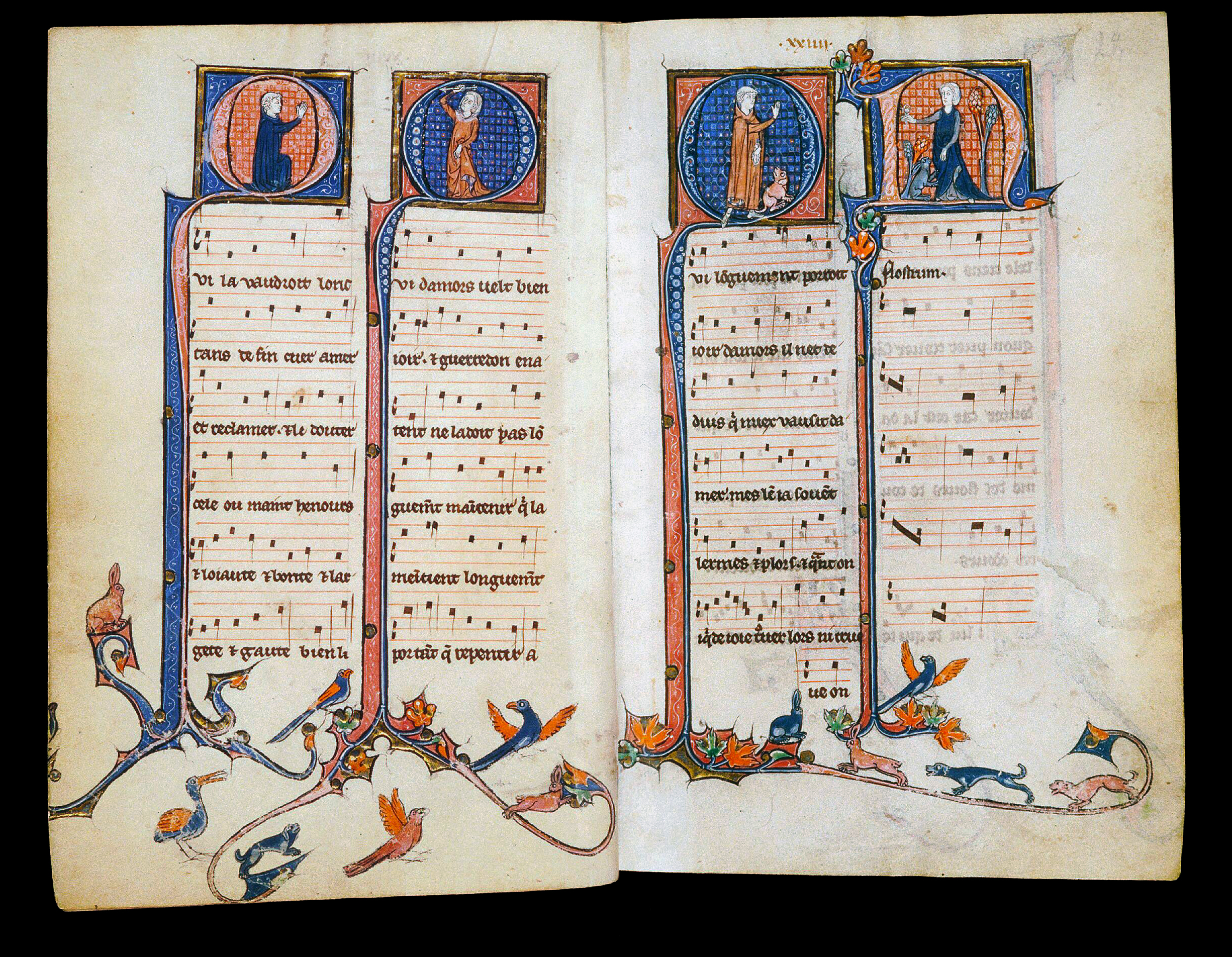
14th-century Montpellier Codex excerpt

Image of exterior and scan of the Montepellier Codex - Part 1

Scan of Montpellier Codex - Part 2

The Montpellier Codex (Montpellier, Bibliothèque Inter-Universitaire, Section Médecine, H196) is an important source of 13th-century French polyphony. The Codex contains 336 polyphonic works probably composed c. 1250–1300, and was likely compiled c. 1300. It is believed to originate from Paris. It was discovered by musicologist Edmond de Coussemaker in c. 1852.

== Format and contents ==
The Montpellier Codex can be roughly divided into 8 fascicles, each of which contain discrete genres of music. The format of the Codex is as follows:

- 1. Liturgical polyphony (ff. 1r-22r)
- 2. French triple motets, consisting of a cantus firmus with three contrapuntal lines above it (ff. 23v-61r)
- 3. Macaronic double motets, consisting of a cantus firmus with two contrapuntal lines above it (ff. 63v-86v)
- 4. Latin double motets (ff. 87v-111r)
- 5. French double motets (ff. 111v-227r)
- 6. French two-voice motets (ff. 231r-269v)
- 7 & 8. Three-voice motets, possibly compiled later than fascicles 2-6 (ff. 270r-397v)

There are also supplements added to fascicles 3, 5, and 7. Because of the different systems of notation used in fascicles 2-6 and fascicles 7-8, the Montpellier Codex has become a crucial source for the chronology of styles of French medieval polyphony. Current research on the chronology of the codex holds that fascicles 2–6, the so-called old corpus, were produced in Paris in the late 1270s and 1280s. Two additional fascicles, nos. 1 and 7 were added apparently in the 1290’s; at this same time appendices were added to fascicles 3 and 5; additions were also made to fascicle 7. Later, at some indeterminate point, an 8th fascicle was added to the codex.

== Music ==
The Montpellier Codex is a critical source for what are known as "Pre-Franconian" and "Franconian" motets, after Franco of Cologne, who proposed an important innovation in how music was written : that the shape of each note should indicate its relative duration.

While the music in the Codex is anonymous, a number of attributions can be made, either because of concordances in other manuscripts or on the basis of stylistic similarity. On this basis, works have been linked to Pérotin (from fascicle 1), Petrus de Cruce, Adam de la Halle, Guillaume d'Auvergne, and Philippe le Chancelier. Many of the cantus firmi are taken from the chants of Notre Dame. While fascicle 1 consists of sacred polyphony, mostly from the Notre Dame school, the largest body of music in the Codex is the collection of French courtly love motets.

Previously, the motets in the collection were not considered to be isorhythmic, as it was felt that the first isorhythmic motets—those of Philippe de Vitry—were not to be composed until the first decades of the 14th century. Recently, however, Michael Lanford has noted that "of the 148 double and triple motets in fascicles two through five of the Montpellier Codex, 114 have repeating colores." After analyzing several motets, he also demonstrates that "each of Richard Hoppin's 'three isorhythmic procedures' which inform 'future developments of the form' can be found in select tenors from the Old Corpus [of the Montpellier Codex], often in ways that demonstrate resourceful approaches to managing the rhythmic modes." For these reasons, Lanford contends that "by glossing over the presence of isorhythmic techniques in thirteenth-century motets, such as those found in fascicles two through five of the Montpellier Codex, scholars have thus limited the appellation of 'isorhythm' using criteria that is well-reasoned, yet perhaps unnecessarily restrictive."

One motet in the Codex was copied from a polyphonic composition by Willelmus de Winchecumbe (fl. 1270s).

== See also ==
- Hymns to Mary
- Alle Psallite Cum Luya
