= Der Geist hilft unser Schwachheit auf, BWV 226 =

Motet by Johann Sebastian Bach

Der Geist hilft unser Schwachheit auf
- BWV 226
- Motet by J. S. Bach
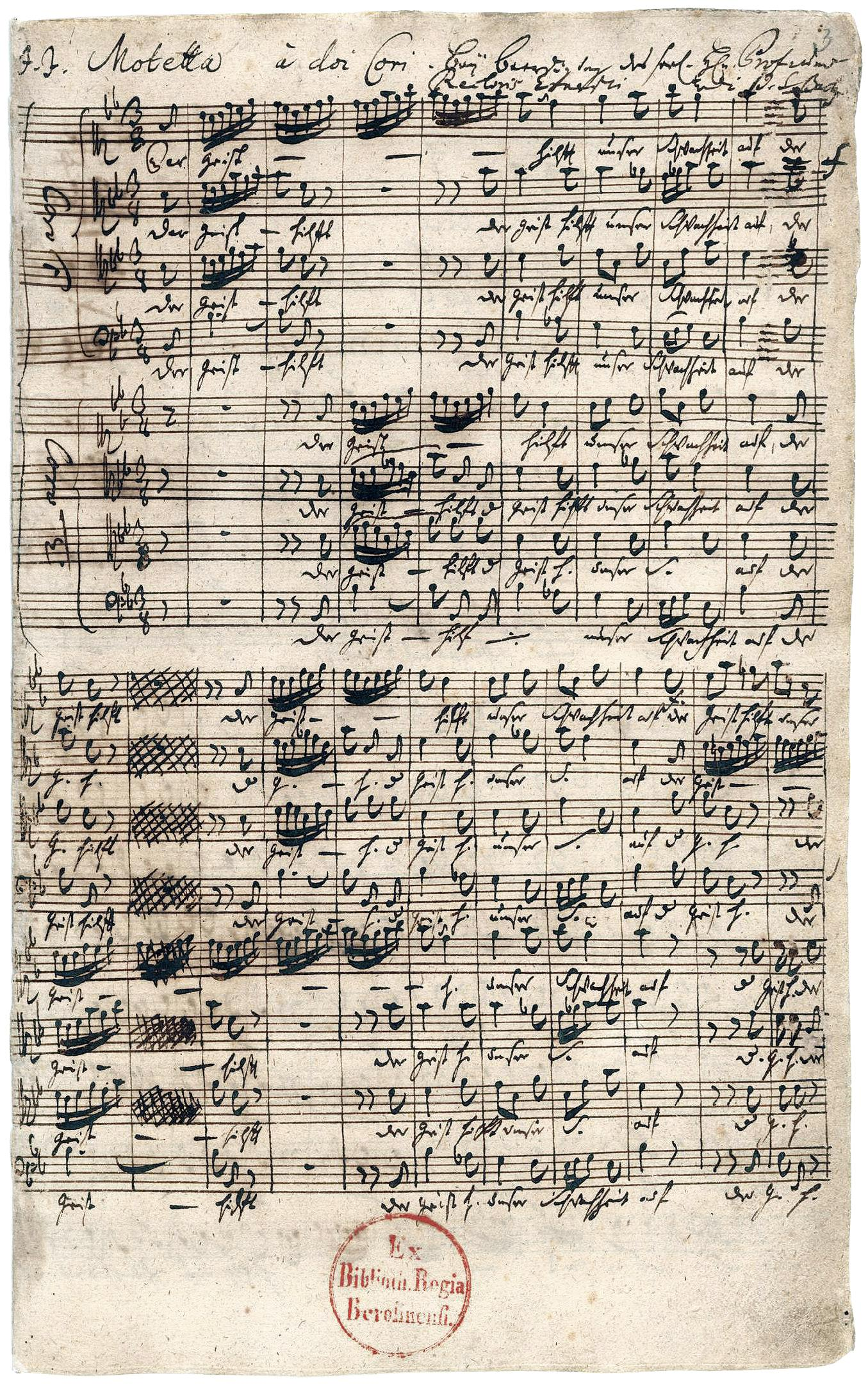
- Manuscript
- Key: B-flat major
- Occasion: Funeral of Johann Heinrich Ernesti
- Bible text: Romans 8:26–27
- Chorale: Komm, Heiliger Geist, Herre Gott
- Performed: 21 October 1729: Paulinerkirche, Leipzig
- Movements: 3
- Vocal: 2 choirs SATB
- Instrumental: strings with choir I, woodwinds with choir II, continuo

Der Geist hilft unser Schwachheit auf (The Spirit gives aid to our weakness), BWV 226, is a motet by Johann Sebastian Bach, composed in Leipzig in 1729 for the funeral of Johann Heinrich Ernesti.

== History ==
For Der Geist hilft unser Schwachheit auf, the autograph score survives. Bach himself noted on its title: "J. J. Motetta à doi Cori bey Beerdigung des seel. Hrn. Prof. und Rectoris Ernesti di J. S. Bach." (Jesu Juva – Motet for two choirs for the funeral for the blessed Rector, Professor Ernesti, by J. S. Bach). Ernesti was professor of poetry at Leipzig University and director of the Thomasschule. The first performance took place in the Paulinerkirche, the university church). Scholars debate if the performance was 24 October, or rather 21 October, as indicated by the title page of the sermon.

Bach wrote a number of works for occasions of Leipzig University. Twelve such works survive: they are mainly festive in character (in German they have been categorised as Festmusiken zu Leipziger Universitätsfeiern). As well as being part of a series of works connected with the university, Der Geist hilft unser Schwachheit auf as a funeral motet is one of a series of Bach motets.

=== Text ===
The text is taken from the Epistle to the Romans (Romans 8:26–27) and Martin Luther's third stanza to the hymn "Komm, Heiliger Geist, Herre Gott" (1524). Ernesti himself had chosen the text from the epistle for the funeral sermon.

== Scoring and structure ==
The motet is scored for two four-part choirs, combined in a single 4-part chorus in movements 2 and 3. Although the concluding chorale "Du heilige Brunst" seems to have been sung at Ernesti's funeral, there is controversy over whether it was combined with the preceding movements or is to considered a separate composition. (Note: Daniel R. Melamed, in Oxford Composer companions J. S. Bach (ed. Malcolm Boyd) says "The best guess is that the chorale was performed later in the ceremonies- perhaps at the grave side- but was not part of the motet, and so it should not be performed as if it were the concluding chorale of the kind often found in Bach's church cantatas.")

Bach's autograph score survives, and in addition there are orchestral parts in the hand of Bach's son Carl Philip Emanuel Bach, indicating that choir I was doubled by strings, choir II by reeds (two oboes, taille and bassoon). For the basso continuo, separate violone and organ parts are provided.

1. Der Geist hilft unser Schwachheit auf
2. Der aber die Herzen forschet
3. Du heilige Brunst, süßer Trost

== Music ==
Bach composed the text according to its meaning, not as music for mourning. The opening contrasts two choirs in imitation. In lively 3/8 time, the word "Geist" (Spirit) is illustrated by a lively melismatic figure. The following idea, "Sondern der Geist selbst vertritt uns" (but the Spirit itself intercedes for), is given as a fugue, first with independent entrances of all eight parts, but concentrated to four parts in the end, "mit unaussprechlichem Seufzen" (with unutterable sighs). The sighs are audible in the broken melodic lines of all voices. The thought "Der aber die Herzen forschet" (He, however, who examines hearts) appears as a double fugue in four parts in stile antico. Here the word "Heiligen" (saints) is illustrated in extended melismatic writing. The third verse of the hymn Komm, Heiliger Geist, Herre Gott, is used as the closing chorale, and is set for four parts.

== Sources ==
- Der Geist hilft unsrer Schwachheit auf: Scores at the International Music Score Library Project
- Motets BWV 225-231 history, scoring, sources for text and music, translations to various languages, discography, discussion, bach-cantatas website
- Bach Motet Translations / BWV 226 - "Der Geist hilft unsrer Schwachheit auf" English translation, discussion, Emmanuel Music
- Der Geist hilft unser Schwachheit auf history, scoring, Bach website (in German)
- BWV 226 Der Geist hilft unser Schwachheit auf English translation, University of Vermont
