= Troparion =

Short hymn in the Byzantine liturgical tradition

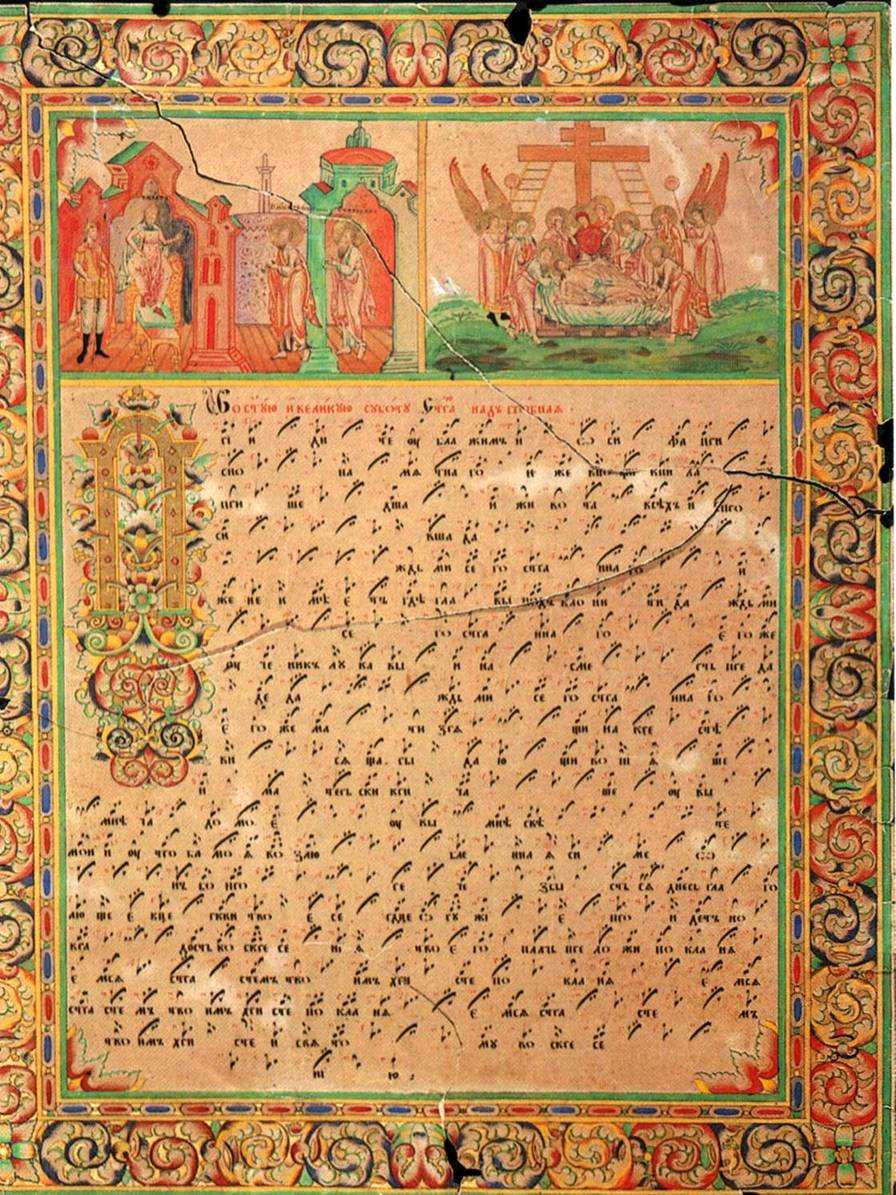
A hand-drawn Old Believer lubok featuring 'hook and banner notation'.

A troparion (Greek τροπάριον, plural: troparia, τροπάρια; Georgian: ტროპარი, tropari; Church Slavonic: тропа́рь, tropar) in Byzantine music and in the religious music of Eastern Orthodox Christianity is a short hymn of one stanza, or organised in more complex forms as series of stanzas.

== The wider meaning of troparion ==
The word probably derived from a diminutive of the Greek tropos ('something repeated', 'manner', 'fashion'), since the earliest function of the troparion was a refrain during the recitation of the cantica (biblical odes) and the psalms, as such the term was used as a synonym of hypakoe. The early meaning of troparion was related to the monastic hymn book Tropologion or Troparologion. Hence its forms were manifold, they could be simple stanzas like apolytikia, theotokia, but also more elaborated homiletic poems like stichera composed in psalmodic hexameters (probably from stichos, "verse"), or in a more complex meter like the odes composed in cycles called canon. Since these Tropologia in their earliest form were organised according to the Octoechos, troparia were always chanted according to a melos of one of the eight tones used in the Eastern liturgical tradition (Gr. echos, Sl. glas). Today, since the redefinition of the Octoechos according to the hyphos of Constantinople, the monodic form of Orthodox chant distincts the troparic (apolytikia, theotokia, kontakia, etc.), the heirmologic (related to the hymns of the Heirmologion), and the sticheraric melos (related to the hymns of the Sticherarion) according to its modal formulas and its tempo.

== The different forms of troparia and their ritual function ==
In casual, unqualified use, troparion usually refers to the apolytikion (Greek: ἀπολυτίκιον), or 'dismissal hymn', a troparion chanted near the end of Vespers which establishes the overall theme for the liturgical day, for which it is called the "troparion of the day". It is chanted again at the beginning of Matins, read at each of the Little Hours, and chanted at the Divine Liturgy following the Little Entrance.

A troparion in honor of the Trinity is called a Triadicon (Greek: Τριαδικόν, Slavonic: Troíchen). Often the penultimate in a series of troparia will be a triadicon, usually preceded by, "Glory to the Father, and to the Son, and to the Holy Spirit." There are also special Triadica ("Hymns to the Trinity") which are chanted after Alleluia at the beginning of Matins on weekdays of Great Lent, which differ according to the tone of the week and the day of the week.

A troparion to the Mother of God (Theotokos) is called a Theotokion (Greek: Θεοτοκίον, Slavonic: Bogoródichen); plural: Theotokia (Θεοτοκία). Theotokia will often occur at the end of a series of troparia, usually preceded by "Both now and ever, and unto the ages of ages. Amen." If a Theotokion makes reference to the Crucifixion of Jesus, it is called a stavrotheotokion (Greek: σταυροθεοτοκίον, Slavonic: krestobogoródichen).

The stanzas of a Canon are troparia, as are the verses interspersed between the Beatitudes at the Divine Liturgy.

== History ==
A famous example, whose existence is attested as early as the 4th century, is the Vespers hymn, Phos Hilaron, "Gladsome Light"; another, O Monogenes Yios, "Only Begotten Son", ascribed to Justinian I (527 - 565), occurs in the introductory portion of the Divine Liturgy. Perhaps the earliest set of troparia of known authorship are those of the monk Auxentios (first half of the 5th century), mentioned in his biography but not preserved in any later Byzantine order of service.

== Occurrence ==
At the present time, troparia occur at the following points in the Divine Services:

=== Vespers ===
- Apolytikion

=== Matins ===
- Apolytikion (after "God is the Lord")
- Sessional Hymns (following readings from the Psalter)
- Canon
- Sessional Hymns (after the Third Ode of the Canon)
- Apolytikion (at the end of Matins)

=== Little Hours ===
- Apolytikion
- (the Royal Hours have special troparia added to them)

=== Divine Liturgy ===
- Beatitudes
- Apolytikion

== Famous troparia ==
=== Paschal troparion, Tone V ===
Christ is risen from the dead,
trampling down death by death,
and upon those in the tombs bestowing life.

=== Troparion of the Holy Cross, Tone I ===
O Lord, save Thy people,

and bless Thine inheritance!

Grant victory to the Orthodox Christians*

over their adversaries,

and by virtue of Thy cross,

preserve Thy habitation.

*In monarchies where Eastern Orthodoxy was the state religion, this troparion was often used as a national anthem with the name of the ruler occurring here.
The original Greek text at this point uses one of two alternative forms: tois basileusi kata barbaron, 'to the Emperors over the barbarians' when referring to an Orthodox Christian sovereign, or tois eusebesi kat' enantion, 'to the pious ones against their adversaries', otherwise.

=== Troparion of Holy Saturday (The Noble Joseph), Tone II ===
The noble Joseph,
when he had taken down Thy most pure body from the Tree,
wrapped it in fine linen and anointed it with spices,
and placed it in a new tomb.

=== "Axion Estin", a theotokion ===
It is truly meet to bless thee, O Theotokos,
ever blessed, and most pure, and the Mother of our God:
more honorable than the cherubim, and more glorious beyond compare than the seraphim.
Without corruption thou gavest birth to God, the Word.
True Theotokos, we magnify thee.

=== Troparion of Kassiani (Chanted during Holy Week on Great and Holy Tuesday) ===
Sensing Thy divinity, O Lord,
a woman of many sins,
takes it upon herself
to become a myrrh-bearer
and in deep mourning
brings before Thee fragrant oil
in anticipation of Thy burial; crying:
"Woe to me! What night falls on me,
what dark and moonless madness
of wild-desire, this lust for sin.
Take my spring of tears
Thou Who drawest water from the clouds,
bend to me, to the sighing of my heart,
Thou who bendedst down the heavens
in Thy secret Incarnation,
I will wash Thine immaculate feet with kisses
and wipe them dry with the locks of my hair;
those very feet whose sound Eve heard
at the dusk in Paradise and hid herself in terror.
Who shall count the multitude of my sins
or the depth of Thy judgment,
O Saviour of my soul?
Do not ignore thy handmaiden,
O Thou whose mercy is endless".

=== Troparion of the Nativity (in Church Slavonic language) ===
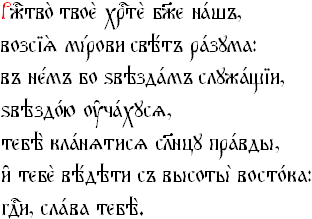

Your birth, O Christ our God,
dawned the light of knowledge upon the earth.
For by Your birth those who adored stars
were taught by a star
to worship You, the Sun of Justice,
and to know You, Orient from on High.
O Lord, glory to You.

== See also ==
- Apolytikion
- Kontakion
