= Friesdorf =

- Stadtteil of Mansfeld
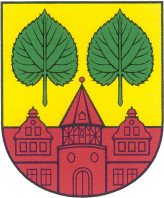
- Coat of arms
- Interactive map of Friesdorf
- Location within Germany Location within Saxony-Anhalt
- Coordinates: 51°35′19″N 11°18′13″E
- Country: Germany
- State: Saxony-Anhalt
- District: Mansfeld-Südharz
- Town: Mansfeld

Area
  - Total: 18.03 km^{2} (6.96 sq mi)
- Elevation: 364 m (1,194 ft)

Population (2006-12-31)
  - Total: 368
  - Density: 20.4/km^{2} (52.9/sq mi)
- Time zone: UTC+01:00 (CET)
  - Summer (DST): UTC+02:00 (CEST)
- Postal codes: 06543
- Dialling codes: 034775
- Vehicle registration: MSH
- Website: www.vgem-wipper-eine.de

Friesdorf is a village and a former municipality in the Mansfeld-Südharz district, Saxony-Anhalt, Germany. Since 6 March 2009, it has been part of the town Mansfeld.

== People ==
- Friedrich Wilhelm Leopold Pfeil (28 March 1783 – 4 September 1859), German forester
