= Theotokion =

Hymn to Mary used in Eastern Christianity

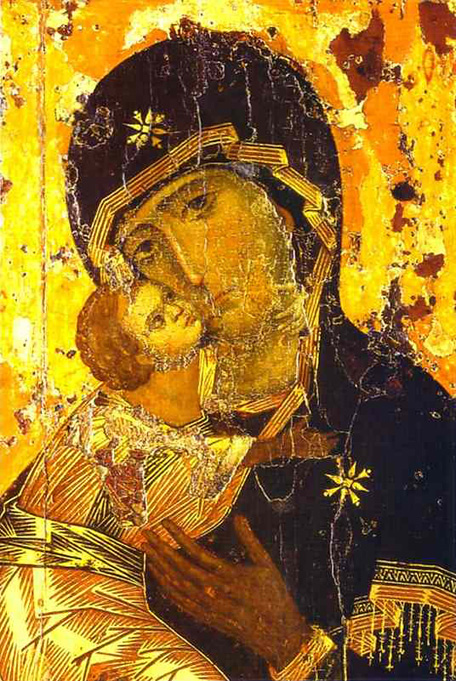
Russian icon of Our Lady of Vladimir.

A theotokion (Greek: Θεοτοκίον; pl. Greek: Θεοτοκία, romanized: Theotokia) is a hymn to Mary the Theotokos (Greek: Θεοτόκος, lit. 'God-bearer'), which is a troparion or sticheron read or chanted during the canonical hours and Divine Liturgy of the Eastern Orthodox and Eastern Catholic churches, as well as in the praises of the Oriental Orthodox churches.

After the condemnation of Nestorianism at the First Council of Ephesus in 431, the use of theotokia during the course of the Divine Services gradually increased. The inclusion of Theotokia in every service is sometimes accredited to Peter the Fuller, Patriarch of Antioch (471–488), a non-Chalcedonian and ardent opponent of Nestorianism.

Theotokia are almost part of every service in the Orthodox Church, but there are more specific forms among them. Theotokia often occur at the end of a series of troparia or stichera, usually after the verse: "[Glory to the Father, and to the Son, and to the Holy Spirit,] Both now and ever, and unto the ages of ages. Amen."

A stavrotheotokion is a hymn to the Theotokos that refers to the Crucifixion. The correlation between the Theotokos and the Cross is natural because of the Virgin Mary's standing by the Cross throughout the Passion. Stavrotheotokia occur most commonly on Wednesdays and Fridays, days which are dedicated to the commemoration of the Cross.

The theotokion that occurs at the end of "Lord, I Have Cried" at Vespers on Saturdays is called a dogmaticon, because its text deals with the mystery of the Incarnation of Christ. The Little Entrance during Vespers is accompanied by the dogmaticon as a processional troparion. The dogmaticon is often chanted in a solemn manner, and while the choir is singing it, the deacon or priest will cense the icon of the Theotokos on the iconostasis. A Little Entrance is also made during the Divine Liturgy while the choir chants the theotokion that ends the Beatitudes.

Theotokia of all types are found in the Horologion, Octoechos, Triodion, Pentecostarion and other liturgical books.

The longest and most popular devotion involving theotokia is the Akathist to the Theotokos. This is solemnly chanted on the Fifth Saturday of Great Lent, and many other times during the year as both public and private devotions.

== Theotokarion ==
A theotokarion (Ancient Greek: θεοτοκάριον, Russian: богородичны праздников, Serbian: Богородичник bogorodičnik, Latin: theotocium) is a book or collection of theotokia. Notable specimens include:

- Theotokarion of Saint Nectarios
- Theotokarion of Saint Nicodemus
- Theotokarion of Saint Nicodemus (1849)
- Noul Theotokarion
- Bodleian Theotokarion
- Theotokarion hōraiotaton kai charmosynon (1688)
- Eustratiades Theotokarion
- Church Slavonic Theotokarion, 15th century, in Hilandar
- Church Slavonic Theotokarion, 16th century, in Kosovo
- Church Slavonic Theotokarion, 17th century, in Hilandar
- Dobrilovina Theotokarion, 1602

== See also ==
- Hymns to Mary
- Kontakion
- Sticheron
- Troparion
