= Kyrios =

Greek word that is usually translated as "lord" or "master"

Kyrios or kurios (Greek: κύριος, romanized: kū́rios (ancient), kyrios (modern)) is a Greek word that is usually translated as "lord" or "master". It is used in the Septuagint translation of the Hebrew Bible (Christian Old Testament) about 7,000 times, in particular translating the name YHWH (the Tetragrammaton), and it appears in the Koine Greek New Testament about 740 times, usually referring to Jesus.

== Classical Greece ==
In Classical Athens, the word kyrios referred to the head of the household, who was responsible for his wife, children, and any unmarried female relatives. It was the responsibility of the kyrios to arrange the marriages of his female relatives, provide their dowries, represent them in court, if necessary, and deal with any economic transactions they were involved in worth more than a medimnos of barley. When an Athenian woman married, her husband became her new kyrios.

The existence of the system of kyrioi (plural of kyrios) elsewhere in ancient Greece is debated, and the evidence is not clear-cut, but Cartledge has argued that in Sparta kyrioi existed, although in Gortyn they do not appear to have done.

The term "κύριος" is still in use in the Modern Greek language and is the equivalent to the English terms "mister" (title conferred on an adult male), "master" (someone who has control over something or someone), and "sir" (an address to any male). For example, the English term "Mr. Smith" is translated to "κύριος Σμίθ" (kyrios Smith) in Greek. Its female form "κυρία, kiría" is the equivalent to the English term Mrs.

== New Testament ==
Kyrios appears about 700 times in the New Testament, usually referring to Jesus. The use of kyrios in the New Testament has been the subject of debate among modern scholars, and three schools of thought exist on that topic.

- The first, most widely accepted school is that based on the Septuagint usage, the designation is intended to equate Jesus with God or assign to Jesus the Old Testament attributes of God. The reasoning here is at the time that the Septuagint was written, when reading out loud Jews pronounced Adonai, the Hebrew word for "Lord", when they encountered the name of God, "YHWH", which was thus translated into Greek from 3rd century CE onwards in each instance as kyrios and theos. The early Christians, the majority of whom were speakers of Greek, would also have been deeply familiar with the Septuagint.
- The second school is that as the early Church expanded, Hellenistic influences resulted in the use of the term.
- The third is that it is a translation of the Aramaic title Mari applied to Jesus.

In everyday Aramaic, Mari was a respectful form of address. In Greek this has at times been translated as kyrios. While the term Mari expressed the relationship between Jesus and his disciples during his life, Christians eventually came to interpret the Greek kyrios as representing lordship over the world.

The Gospel of John rarely uses kyrios to refer to Jesus during his ministry, but does so after the Resurrection, though the vocative kyrie (meaning sir) appears frequently. The Gospel of Mark never applies the term kyrios as a direct reference to Jesus, unlike Paul who uses it 163 times. When Mark uses kyrios (e.g., in 1:3, 11:9, 12:11, etc.) it is in reference to YHWH/God. Mark does, however, use the word in passages where it is unclear whether it applies to God or Jesus, e.g., in 5:19 or 11:3. In the Gospel of Matthew, Jesus talks about himself using the double vocative "κύριε κύριε", making a reference to the Septuagint, because in places where the Hebrew text has "Adonai YHWH", the Septuagint has "κύριε κύριε". In Matthew 7:21, Jesus makes this reference to call himself YHWH using Septuagint terms.

Kyrios is a key element of the Christology of Apostle Paul. Most scholars agree that the use of kyrios, and hence the Lordship of Jesus, predated the Pauline Epistles, but Saint Paul expanded and elaborated on the topic. More than any other title, kyrios defined the relationship between Jesus and those who believed in him as Christ: Jesus was their Lord and Master who was to be served with all their hearts and who would one day judge their actions throughout their lives.

The kyrios title for Jesus is central to New Testament Christology, for the early Christians put it at the center of their understanding and from that center attempted to understand the other issues related to the Christian mysteries.

Kyrios is also vital in the Trinity, as well as New Testament Pneumatology (the study of the Holy Spirit). 2 Corinthians 3:17-18 says:

Now the Lord is the Spirit, and where the Spirit of the Lord is, there is freedom. 18 And we all, with unveiled face, beholding the glory of the Lord,[e] are being transformed into the same image from one degree of glory to another. For this comes from the Lord who is the Spirit.

The phrase "The Lord is the Spirit" in verse 17 is Ὁ δὲ Κύριος τὸ Πνεῦμά (Ho dé Kū́rios tó Pneûmá). In verse 18 it is Κυρίου Πνεύματος (Kūríou Pneúmatos).

In some cases, when reading the Hebrew Bible, the Jews would substitute Adonai (my Lord) for the Tetragrammaton, and they may have also substituted Kyrios when reading to a Greek audience. Origen refers to both practices in his commentary on Psalms (2.2). The practice was due to the desire not to overuse the name of God. Examples of this can be seen in Philo.

A few translations of the New Testament render kyrios in a particular way when it occurs within an Old Testament quotation. These include "Jehovah" (New World Translation), "LORD" (New Living Translation), "ADONAI" (Complete Jewish Bible), and "Eternal One" (The Voice).

== See also ==
- Dominus (title)
- I am (biblical term)
- Kyriarchy
- Kyrie eleison
- Names and titles of Jesus in the New Testament
- Pater familias
- Septuagint
- Tetragrammaton
- Theos Kyrios
