= Apolytikion =

Form of hymn in the Byzantine liturgical tradition

The Apolytikion (Greek: Ἀπολυτίκιον) or Dismissal Hymn is a troparion (a short hymn of one stanza) said or sung at Orthodox Christian worship services. The apolytikion summarizes the feast being celebrated that day. It is chanted at Vespers, Matins and the Divine Liturgy; and it is read at each of the Little Hours. The name derives from the fact that it is chanted for the first time before the dismissal (Greek: apolysis) of the first service of the liturgical day, Vespers, the liturgical day beginning at sunset in the Orthodox Church.

== Church Slavonic ==
Although the term apolytikion is used in the Greek language, there is no equivalent word in Church Slavonic where variously are used such terms as "отпустительный тропарь" (dismissal troparion), "тропарь праздника" (troparion of the feast), "тропарь святого" (troparion of the saint), and so on.

== Examples ==
The apolytikion of the Feast of the Nativity (December 25):

Your birth, O Christ our God, dawned the light of knowledge upon the earth. For by Your birth those who adored stars were taught by a star to worship You, the Sun of Justice, and to know You, Orient from on High. O Lord, glory to You.

The apolytikion for the Feast of the Annunciation (March 25):

Today is the crowning of our salvation and the manifestation of the Mystery which is from eternity; the Son of God becometh the Son of the Virgin, and Gabriel announceth the glad tidings of grace: wherefore let us cry out with him to the Mother of God; Hail, full of grace, the Lord is with thee!

The apolytikion of Pascha (Easter):

Christ is risen from the dead, trampling down death by death, and upon those in the tombs bestowing life!

There are also eight Resurrectional Apolytikia for the Lord's Day, Sunday written in each of the Eight Tones.

== See also ==
- Collect, a similar prayer in the liturgies of Catholic, Lutheran, or Anglican churches
- Kontakion
