= Come, Holy Spirit =

Catholic prayer

Come, Holy Spirit is a Christian prayer for guidance. It is discussed in the Catechism of the Catholic Church, paragraphs 2670–2672. It is used with the Catholic Church, as well as some Anglican and Lutheran denominations.

== Come, Holy Spirit ==
=== Latin ===
Veni Sancte Spiritus, reple tuórum corda fidélium et tui amóris in eis ignem accénde.
Emítte Spíritum tuum, et creabúntur.
Et renovábis fáciem terræ.
Orémus.
Deus, qui corda fidélium Sancti Spíritus illustratióne docuísti,
da nobis in eódem Spíritu recta sápere, et de eius semper consolatióne gaudére.
Per Christum, Dóminum nostrum. Amen.

=== Typical English version ===
Come, Holy Spirit, fill the hearts of Thy faithful and kindle in them the fire of Thy love. Send forth Thy Spirit and they shall be created. And Thou shalt renew the face of the earth. O God, who by the light of the Holy Spirit didst instruct the hearts of Thy faithful, grant us in the same Spirit to be truly wise, and ever rejoice in His consolation. Through Christ, our Lord. Amen

== Lutheran use ==
The prayer is used as a canticle in the Lutheran Church of Sweden. Though rarely sung in regular worship, it is a standard part of the opening of clerical synods and during ordinations of priests, usually during the final rite of vesting the priests after they have made their vows. In such cases, it is often sung first in its original Latin, followed by the Swedish translation.

== See also ==
- Veni Creator Spiritus
