= Praise the Lord (greeting) =

Praise the Lord is a Christian greeting phrase used in various parts of the world in English, as well as other languages. The salutation is derived from the Bible, where it and related phrases occurs around 250 times (cf. Psalm 117:1–2). The usage of the greeting phrase is indicative of the Christian religious identity of an individual, especially in a multi-faith society such as the Indian subcontinent, where it is translated into languages such as the lingua franca Hindi-Urdu (Jai Masih Ki). In Poland, the Christian greeting phase "Praise the Lord" (Polish: Niech będzie pochwalony) has been used especially in the countryside to initiate conversation, especially in the pre-World War II era. It has been used among the Polish diaspora too, in places like Detroit.

In the United Methodist Church, among other Christian denominations, the "Praise the Lord" is used as a liturgical greeting during the season of Eastertide in the Christian calendar. In the Methodist worship, it serves as the response to the presider's blessing, as well as being an ejaculatory prayer during revival meetings. The Church of England, mother Church of the Anglican Communion, uses "Praise the Lord" as a call to worship too.

== See also ==
- Shalom aleichem
- As-salamu alaykum
- Namaste
