= Clean Monday =

Eastern Christian holiday during Great Lent

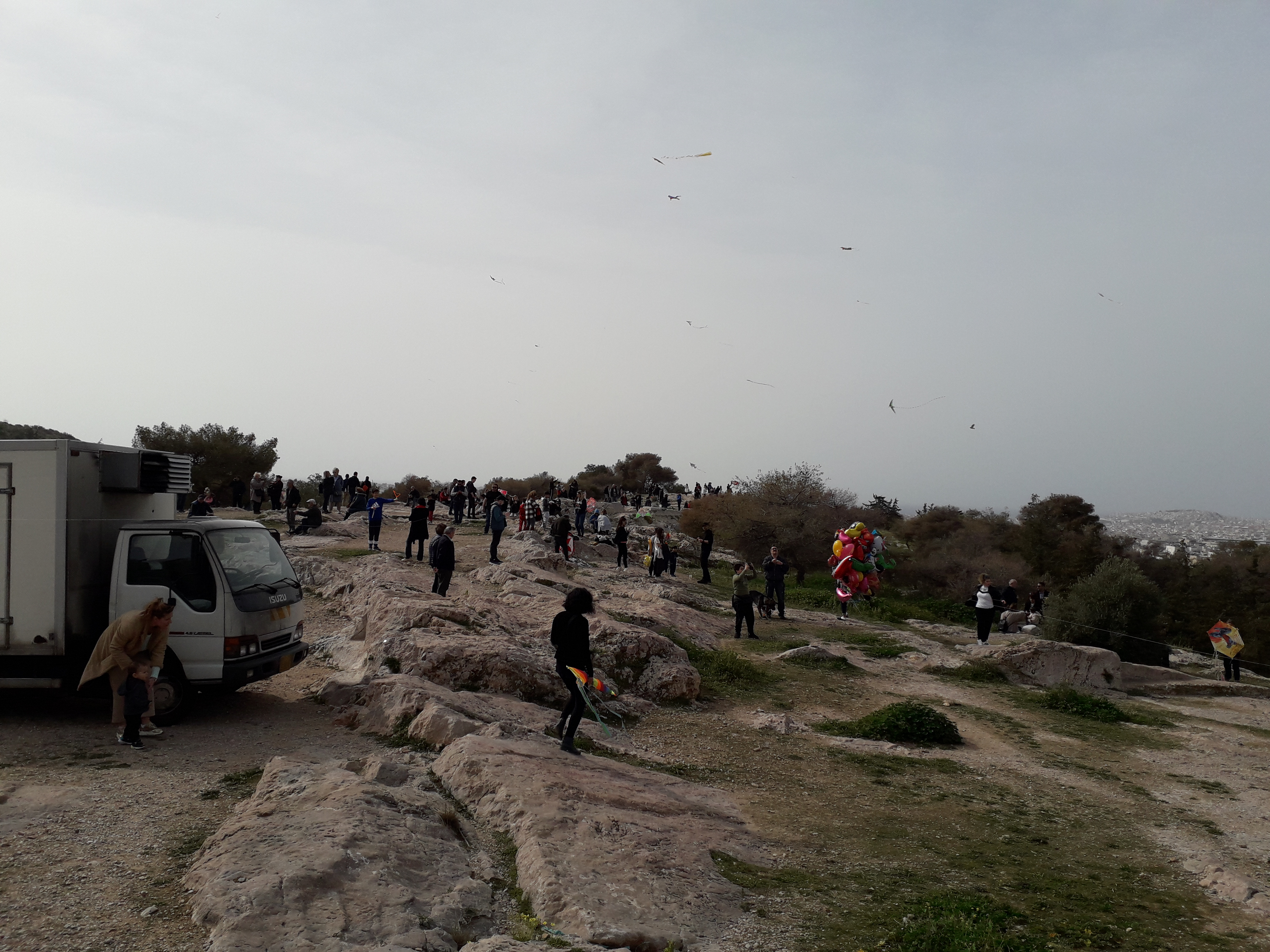
- Kite-flyers on Clean Monday on Philopappos Hill, Athens, Greece
- Observed by: Oriental and Eastern Orthodox Christians; Eastern Catholics
- Type: Eastern Christian
- Date: 48 days before Pascha Sunday
- 2025 date: 3 March; 3 March (Gregorian computus)
- 2026 date: 23 February; 16 February (Gregorian computus)
- 2027 date: 15 March; 8 February (Gregorian computus)
- Frequency: annual
- Related to: First day of Great Lent

Clean Monday (Greek: Καθαρά Δευτέρα, Kathara Deftera), also known as Pure Monday, Green Monday or simply Monday of Lent is the first day of Great Lent throughout Eastern Christianity and is a moveable feast, falling on the sixth Monday before Palm Sunday which begins Holy Week, preceding Pascha Sunday (Easter).

The common term for this day, "Clean Monday", refers to the purification of the body in preparation to the Great Lent: first day of abstinence of non-fasting foods and, for those who are able to do so, also fasting from all kinds of food. Traditionally, as it happens in many Orthodox countries and traditions, people do a very strict fast, purifying themselves of all food until the Divine Liturgy on Wednesday, in a way that the Holy Body of Christ is the first nutrition that Christians will have during the Lent. Outside the Orthodox Church, it could be sometimes called "Ash Monday", by analogy with Ash Wednesday (the first day of Lent in Western Christianity). The term is often a misnomer, as only a small subset of Eastern Catholic Churches practice the imposition of ashes. The Maronite, Chaldean and the Syro-Malabar Catholic Churches are notable amongst the Eastern rites employing the use of ashes on this day.

== Date ==
Clean Monday is part of the paschal cycle, and as such it depends on the paschal computus which may differ between denominations and churches. (Note: Notably, the Orthodox Church of Finland uses the Gregorian Paschalion.) Additionally, the date may also depend on the calendar used by the particular church, such as the (revised) Julian calendar used by Eastern Orthodox churches, the Gregorian calendar used by Eastern Catholics, and the Ethiopian or Coptic calendars traditionally used by some Oriental Orthodox churches. When Easter coincides in different calendars, Clean Monday is two days before Ash Wednesday (the day known in the West as Shrove Monday); otherwise it is in a different week.

== Liturgical aspects ==
Liturgically, Clean Monday—and thus Lent itself—begins on the preceding (Sunday) night, at a special service called Forgiveness Vespers, which culminates with the Ceremony of Mutual Forgiveness, at which all present will bow down before one another and ask forgiveness. In this way, the faithful begin Lent with a clean conscience, with forgiveness, and with renewed Christian love. The entire first week of Great Lent is often referred to as "Clean Week", and it is customary to go to Confession during this week, and to clean the house thoroughly.

The theme of Clean Monday is set by the Old Testament reading appointed to be read at the Sixth Hour on this day (Isaiah 1:1–20), which says, in part:

Wash yourselves and ye shall be clean; put away the wicked ways from your souls before Mine eyes; cease to do evil; learn to do well. Seek judgment, relieve the oppressed, consider the fatherless, and plead for the widow. Come then, and let us reason together, saith the Lord: Though your sins be as scarlet, I will make them white as snow; and though they be red like crimson, I will make them white as wool (vv. 16–18).

Traditionally, it is considered to mark the beginning of the spring season, a notion which was used symbolically in Ivan Bunin's critically acclaimed story, Pure Monday. The happy, springtime atmosphere of Clean Monday may seem at odds with the Lenten spirit of repentance and self-control, but this seeming contradiction is a marked aspect of the Orthodox approach to fasting, in accordance with the Gospel lesson (Matthew 6:14–21) read on the morning before, which admonishes:

When ye fast, be not, as the hypocrites, of a sad countenance: for they disfigure their faces, that they may appear unto men to fast. Verily I say unto you, They have their reward. But thou, when thou fastest, anoint thine head, and wash thy face, that thou appear not unto men to fast, but unto thy Father which is in secret... (v. 16–18).

In this manner, the Orthodox celebrate the fact that "the springtime of the Fast has dawned, the flower of repentance has begun to open".

== Observances ==
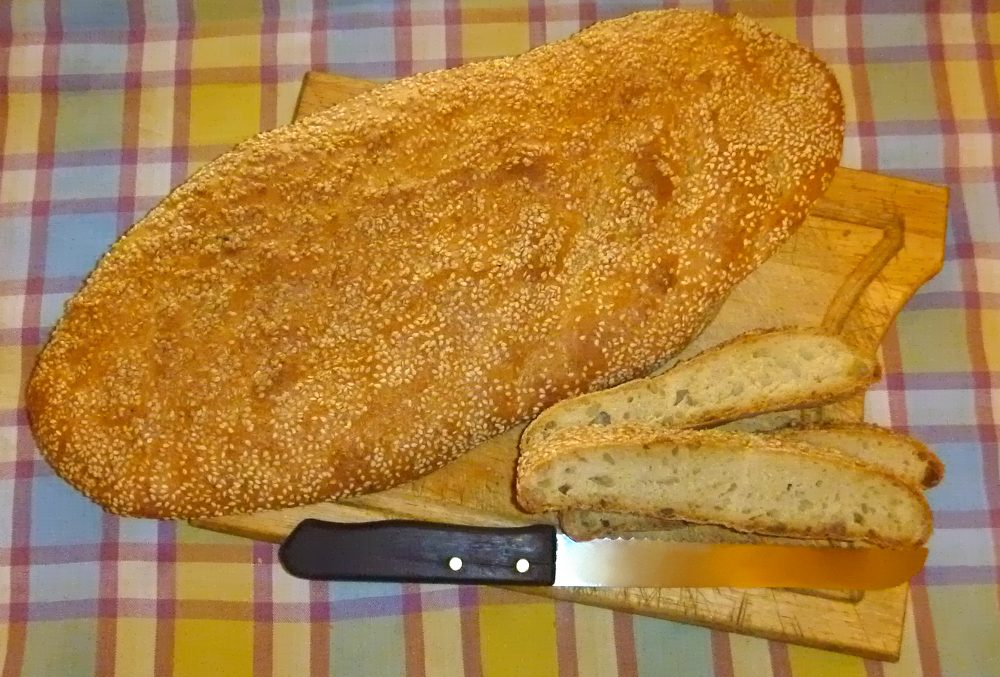
Leavened lagana with sesame seeds

Eating meat, eggs and dairy products is traditionally forbidden to Orthodox Christians throughout Lent, which begins with Clean Monday. Fish is eaten only on major feast days, but shellfish is permitted in European denominations. This has created the tradition of eating elaborate dishes based on seafood (shellfish, molluscs, fish roe etc.).

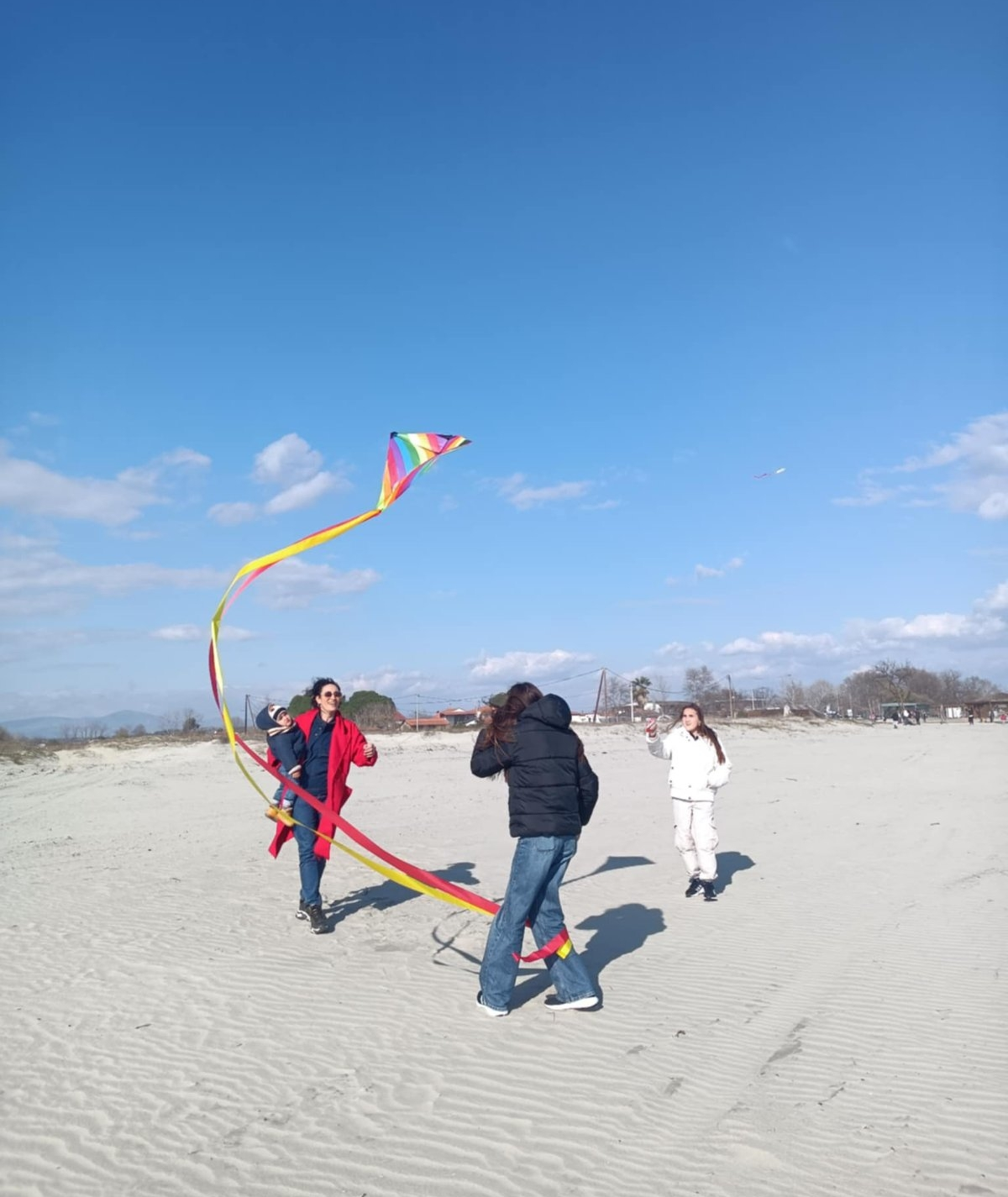
Flying a kite during Clean Monday in Greece

Clean Monday is a public holiday in Greece and Cyprus, where it is celebrated with outdoor excursions, the consumption of shellfish and other fasting food, (Note: Strictly observant Orthodox hold this day (and also Clean Tuesday and Wednesday) as a strict fast day, on which no solid food at all is eaten. Others will eat only in the evening, and then only xerophagy (lit. "dry eating"; a type of fasting that includes eating only raw or simply prepared foods, especially foods prepared with no oils, such as bread and honey, fruit, nuts, halva, etc).) a special kind of azyme bread, baked only on that day, named "lagana" (Greek: λαγάνα) and the widespread custom of flying kites, as it symbolises "trying to reach the Divine".

== See also ==
- Maslenitsa
- Shrove Monday
- Shrove Tuesday
