= Spring cleaning =

Act of cleaning a house during the springtime

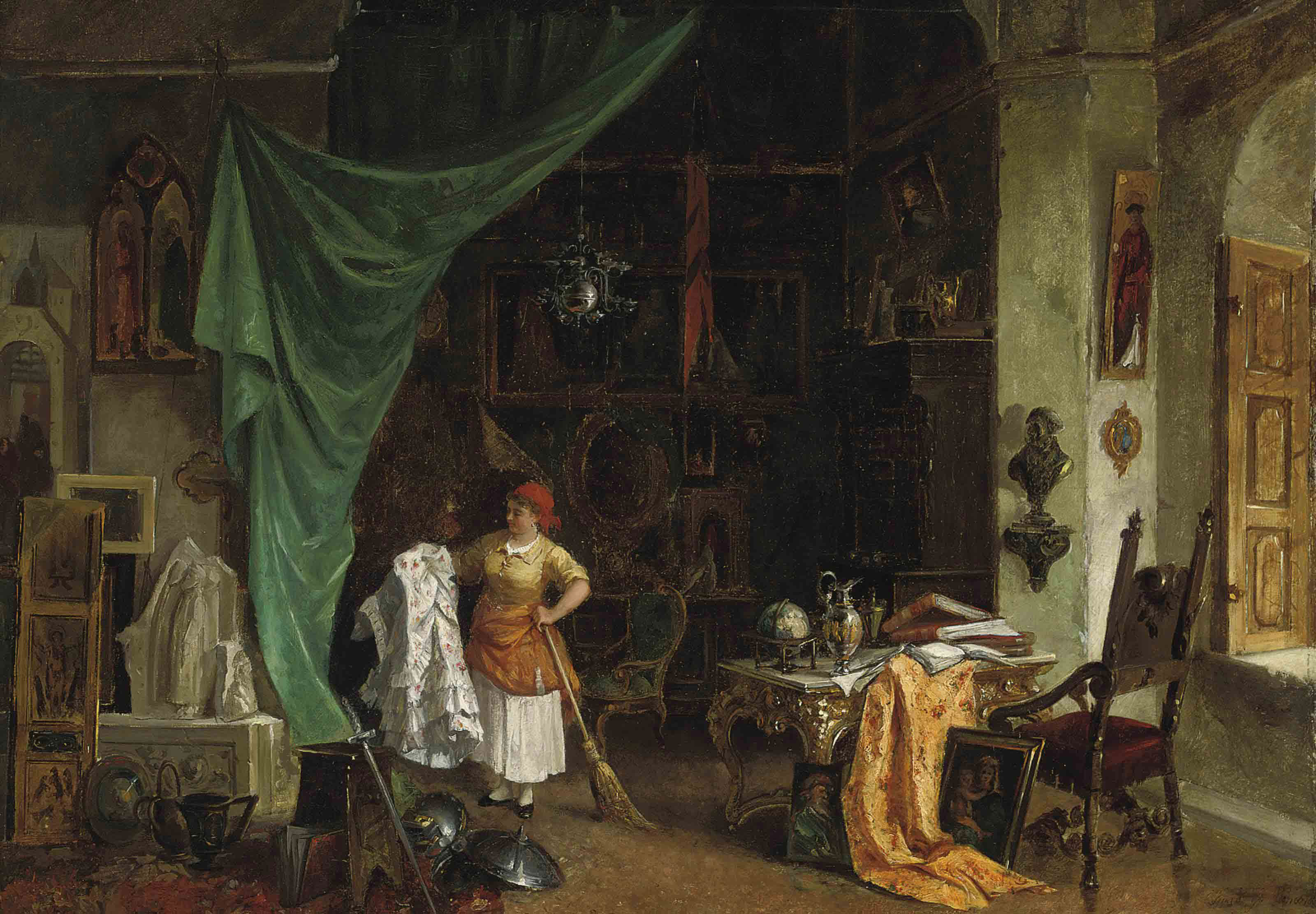
The Spring Clean, a 19th century painting

Spring cleaning is the practice of thoroughly cleaning a house in the springtime. The practice of spring cleaning is especially prevalent in climates with a cold winter. In many cultures, annual cleaning occurs at the end of the year, which may be in spring or winter, depending on the calendar.

The term is also used metaphorically for any kind of heavy duty cleaning or organizing enterprise. A person who gets their affairs in order before an audit or inspection could be said to be doing some spring cleaning.

== History ==
Some researchers trace the origin of spring cleaning to the Iranian Nowruz, the Persian new year, which falls on the first day of spring. Iranians continue the practice of khaneh tekani (Persian: خانه‌تکانی; literally "shaking the house") just before the Persian new year. Everything in the house is thoroughly cleaned, from drapes to furniture.

Another possibility has been suggested that the origins of spring cleaning date back to the ancient Jewish practice of thoroughly cleansing the home in anticipation of the springtime festival of Passover (Pesach). In remembrance of the Israelites' hasty flight from Egypt following their captivity there, during the week-long observance of the Passover holiday, there are strict prohibitions against eating or drinking anything which may have been leavened or fermented (Exodus 12:15, 19). Jews are not only supposed to refrain from leavened foodstuffs (chametz), they are expressly commanded to rid their homes of even small remnants of chametz for the length of the holiday (Exodus 12:15). Therefore, observant Jews conduct a thorough "spring cleaning" of the house, followed by a traditional hunt for chametz crumbs (bedikat chametz) by candlelight on the evening before the holiday begins.

Traditionally, Catholics clean church altars on Maundy Thursday, which happens before Good Friday, in the Spring. Spring cleaning persists today in Greece, and other Orthodox nations. It is traditional to clean the house thoroughly either right before or during the first week of Great Lent, which is referred to as Clean Week. This also often corresponds with the Julian New Year, or April 1.

In North America and northern Europe, the custom found an especially practical value due to those regions' continental and wet climates. During the 19th century in America, prior to the advent of the vacuum cleaner, March was often the best time for dusting because it was getting warm enough to open windows and doors (but not warm enough for insects to be a problem), and the high winds could carry the dust out of the house. This time of year is also when coal furnaces would not run and one could wash the soot from the walls and furniture left by the furnace. For the same reason, modern rural households often use the month of March for cleaning projects involving the use of chemical products which generate fumes.

== Other seasonal cleaning ==
Similar traditions have annual cleaning in winter.

In Scotland, "New Year's cleaning" is traditionally done on Hogmanay (December 31), a practice now also widespread in Ireland and North America.

In Japan, ōsōji (大掃除; "big cleaning") is done in late December, before ōmisoka and the new year on January 1. This was predated by the tradition of susu-harai (煤払い; "soot cleaning") during the Edo period (1603–1868), which was observed on December 13 and cleaned homes to welcome toshigami (gods of the year).

In southern China regions including Canton and Hong Kong, traditional customs of lunar new year include cleaning on the 28th day of the 12th month of the year. Deep cleaning also symbolizes warding off bad luck from the previous year and reserving space for "prosperity" that will come along with the new year.

Among Neo-Pagans, biannual equinox cleanings are sometimes performed at the onset of spring and autumn, to symbolize beginning of a new cycle with a clean spiritual slate.

"Diwali ki safai" or Diwali-cleaning in most parts of India is traditionally done a couple of days (or weeks) before the festival of Diwali. It is a tradition that involves cleaning and organizing one's home before the festival to remove negativity and welcome positivity. It's also believed that a clean home will be blessed by Goddess Lakshmi. In the lead-up to Diwali, celebrants will prepare by cleaning, renovating, and decorating their homes and workplaces with Diyas (oil lamps) and rangolis (colorful art circle patterns).

== See also ==
- Khāne-takānī, an Iranian tradition of spring cleaning
