= Reserved sacrament =

Element of certain Christian churches

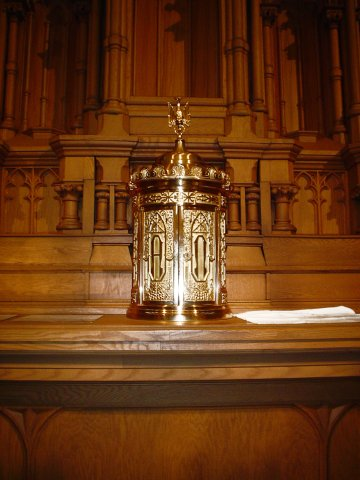
The tabernacle at St. Raphael's Cathedral in Dubuque, Iowa, containing the reserved sacrament

The reserved sacrament refers to the consecrated body of Christ set aside and reserved after the reception of Communion during the Mass. The reserved sacrament is usually stored in a tabernacle, a locked cabinet made of precious materials and usually located on, above, or near the high altar. In Western Christianity, usually only the Host, from Latin: hostia, meaning "victim" (the consecrated bread), is reserved, except where consecrated wine might be kept for the sick who cannot consume a host.

During the Liturgy of the Eucharist, the second part of the Mass, the elements of bread and wine are considered to have been changed into the veritable Body and Blood of Jesus Christ. The manner in which this occurs is referred to by the term transubstantiation, a theory of St. Thomas Aquinas, in the Roman Catholic Church. Members of the Orthodox, Anglican, and Lutheran communions also believe that Jesus Christ is really and truly present in the bread and wine, but they believe that the way in which this occurs must forever remain a sacred mystery.

The reasons for the reservation of the sacrament vary by tradition, but until around 1000 AD the only reason for reserving the sacrament was to be taken to the ill, homebound, or dying (viaticum). After that, devotional practices arose, including Eucharistic adoration and the holding of Communion services when a priest was unavailable to celebrate Mass.

== Purpose and practice ==
=== Facilitating access to the sacrament ===
The first mention of reservation describes the original and, arguably, primary purpose. In the Apology of Justin Martyr, a 2nd-century Christian writer, he describes the Eucharist ending with the distribution by the deacons to the parishioners "and to those who are absent, they carry away a portion". Reservation for distribution of the Communion to the sick is mentioned subsequently in the writings of Tertullian, St. Cyprian, and St. Basil. People kept the sacrament in their homes and carried on their person as being a safe place. After the conversion of Constantine in the early 4th century, the more common place for reservation was in a church. Indeed, a Council of Toledo in 480 denounced those who did not immediately consume the sacred species when they received them from the priest at the altar, but at the same time numerous decrees of synods and penalties entered in penitential books impose upon parish priests the duty of reserving the Blessed Sacrament for the use of the sick and dying, and at the same time of keeping it reverently and securely and providing by frequent renewal against any danger of the corruption of the sacred species.

The sacrament would be kept either in the sacristy or in the church itself in a pyx hanging over the altar, an aumbry – a safe in the wall of the church – or in a tabernacle – literally a tent, but in fact a metal safe on or immediately behind the altar itself, sometimes covered with a seasonally coloured cloth. Caskets in the form of a dove or of a tower, made for the most part of one of the precious metals, were commonly used for the purpose, but whether in the early Middle Ages these Eucharistic vessels were kept over the altar, or elsewhere in the church, or in the sacristy, does not clearly appear. After the 10th century the commonest usage in England and France seems to have been to suspend the Blessed Sacrament in a dove-shaped vessel by a cord over the high altar. Fixed and locked tabernacles were known and indeed prescribed by the regulations of Bishop Quivil of Exeter at the end of the 13th century, though in England they never came into general use before the Reformation. In Germany, in the 14th and 15th centuries, a custom widely prevailed of enshrining the Eucharist in a "sacrament house", often beautifully decorated, separate from the high altar but only a short distance away from it, and on the north or Gospel side of the Church. This custom seems to have originated in the desire to allow the Blessed Sacrament to be seen by the faithful without exactly contravening the synodal decrees which forbade any continuous exposition. In the sacrament house, the door was invariably made of metal lattice work, through which the vessel containing the sacred species could be discerned at least obscurely.

In Methodist Churches, following the liturgy, communion is taken to the sick and homebound; this is termed as "Extending the Table for those unable to be present". Ordained Elders may train laymen to take the elements to the sick. In Methodist theology, "When the elements are taken to the unwillingly absent by laypeople, those laypeople are not celebrating the sacrament again, but are recalling it and extending it to those who are otherwise forced to be absent from the Holy Meal."

=== Devotion ===
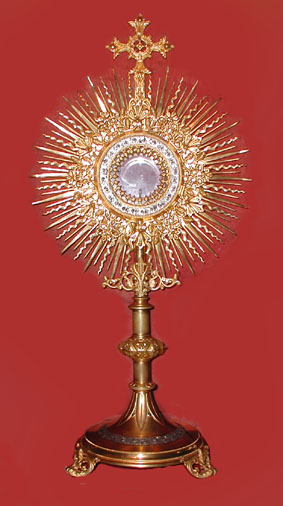
A traditional "solar" monstrance used to display the Blessed Sacrament

A second purpose of reservation is that it might be a focus of prayer. In the 3rd century, catechumens baptized at Easter or Pentecost might spend eight days in meditation before the Blessed Sacrament, reserved in a home-church, before Christianity was legalized. However, only since the year 1000, or even later, was the Blessed Sacrament kept in churches so that the faithful might visit it or pray before it. The Second Vatican Council (1963-1965) gave guidance to priests that "a visit to and veneration of the Most Holy Eucharist" would be of "great worth" as part of their daily practice of prayer.

Exposition of the Blessed Sacrament in the Roman Catholic Church and Anglican Churches for the purposes of adoration has been current since the 14th century and may be either private (expositio privata), where only the doors of the tabernacle are opened, or public exposition where the Host is placed in a monstrance so that it may be more readily seen. Public exposition, formerly permitted only on the feast of Corpus Christi, developed only in recent centuries into a formal service known as Benediction of the Blessed Sacrament.

Reservation was prohibited in many Protestant churches in the 16th century. In England it was permitted in the First Book of Common Prayer of 1549, but disallowed in 1552. The Thirty-Nine Articles stated, "The Sacrament of the Lord's Supper was not by Christ's ordinance reserved, carried about, lifted up, or worshipped." In 1662, the prayer book rubric was altered to the effect that after the Communion any remains were to be reverently consumed. The practice of reservation died out among Anglicans until the 19th century when, under the influence of the Tractarians, members of the Oxford Movement, it was restored. In Tract 90, John Henry Newman argued for a permissive interpretation of Article XXVIII.

During the First World War, the practice of reservation was developed in the Anglican church, partly to allow chaplains in the Army to give Communion in the trenches or on the battlefield to severely wounded soldiers. Nevertheless, this caused energetic debate amongst Anglican theologians of the time.

=== Easter triduum ===
A third reason for reservation is that, during the Easter Triduum in the Roman Catholic Church and in many Anglican churches, after the celebration of the Mass of the Lord's Supper a vigil is kept before the sacrament, placed on an Altar of Repose or similar place of reservation, until the Good Friday service at which, by tradition, there is no celebration of Mass, but the faithful receive from the reserved sacrament in the Communion part of the Celebration of the Lord's Passion: this period is seen by some as symbolic of the time between the Last Supper and the Crucifixion of Jesus. There is then no celebration until the Easter Vigil in the night leading to Easter Sunday. This pattern, revived in 1955 under Pope Pius XII, was incorporated into the liturgical reforms that followed the Second Vatican Council, but it goes back to the liturgy of Jerusalem, recorded by Egeria in the 4th century.

=== Celebrations in the absence of a priest ===
The fourth reason for reservation is in order that the faithful may receive Communion on a Sunday or other Holy Day in the absence of the priest in the frame of an appropriate service, a need that emerged with the fall in the number of vocations.

==== Catholic church practice ====
In the Catholic Church, the main document concerning this celebration is the Directory for Sunday Celebrations in the Absence of a Priest, issued by the Congregation for Divine Worship and the Discipline of the Sacraments on June 2, 1988. This celebration is never called Mass, because it lacks the consecration of the Eucharist.

When it is possible this celebration is led by a deacon (who wears his own vestment), otherwise it is led by an appointed layperson, who acts as one among equals, in the way followed in the Liturgy of the Hours when not presided over by an ordained minister and who sits outside the sanctuary. The structure of the celebration is the following:

- Introductory rites: similar in aim and structure to the Introductory rites of the Mass, though the greeting, "The Lord be with you" is reserved to the priest or deacon; another format is used when a layperson presides at the service (the word "celebrant" should only be used for an ordained priest when he is officiating at Mass);
- Liturgy of the Word: similar in aim and structure to the Liturgy of the Word of the Mass. The readings are the same as in the Mass of the day. The homily can be given only by the deacon, if present, otherwise the layperson might read a homily previously prepared by a priest;
- Thanksgiving: a hymn, psalm, or litany in which the faithful praise the glory and mercy of God. It shall not to be similar to the thanksgiving of the Eucharistic prayers.
- Communion rites: the ritual of the Roman Ritual for Communion outside Mass shall be used. For Communion, if at all possible, hosts consecrated that same Sunday in a Mass celebrated elsewhere is used, otherwise the reserved hosts are used;
- Concluding rites: similar in aim and structure to the ones in the Mass.

The Directory for Sunday Celebrations in the Absence of a Priest remarks many times on the need to use prayers, wordings, and gestures different from those used in the Mass, in order to avoid confusion.

==== Lutheran Churches ====
In the Lutheran view, the sacraments belong to the entirety of the Church, rather than to an institutional hierarchy. As such in rare cases, lay celebrations of the Eucharist are authorized when no priest is available:

Let everyone, therefore, who knows himself to be a Christian, be assured of this, that we are all equally priests, that is to say, we have the same power in respect to the Word and the sacraments. However, no one may make use of this power except by the consent of the community or by the call of a superior. (For what is the common property of all, no individual may arrogate to himself, unless he is called.) And therefore this “sacrament” of ordination, if it is anything at all, is nothing else than a certain rite whereby one is called to the ministry of the church. —Martin Luther

==== Anglican Communion ====
In the Anglican Communion a similar problem has resulted in the General Synod of the Church of England authorising a service of Communion by Extension. Because of the traditional hostility to reservation, apart from the requirement that the Communion continues to be celebrated 'regularly' in each parish church, the instruction is that "the consecrated bread and wine be brought to the church from the celebration of Holy Communion in a seemly and dignified manner" implying that the service will have taken place in another church but on the same day. Moreover, "[e]xplicit permission must be obtained from the bishop for the use of this rite. This permission should relate to specific pastoral circumstances, thus emphasizing the exceptional nature of this ministry."

== Eastern Christian practice ==
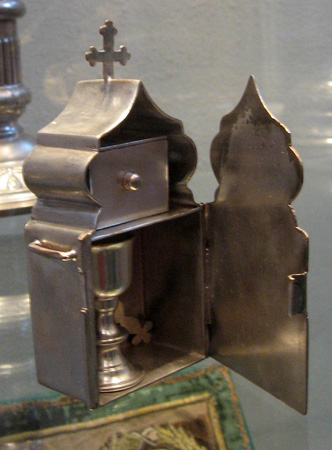
Russian Orthodox vessel for taking Holy Communion to the sick (Kyiv Pechersk Lavra), kept in a tabernacle on the Holy Table (altar)

In the Eastern Orthodox Church and Eastern Catholic Churches, as in the early church, the Sacred Mysteries (Blessed Sacrament) are reserved only for the Communion of the sick, or for the Lenten Liturgies of the Presanctified. A Consecrated Lamb (Host) is moistened with the Blood of Christ and allowed to dry. It is then cut into small portions which are reserved in the tabernacle.

When the priest takes Holy Communion to the sick, he transfers a portion to a vessel which is worn around the neck. Inside the vessel are compartments for a gilded box to contain the Mysteries, a tiny chalice, a bottle for wine, a small gilded spoon and often a gilded set of tweezers. As he goes from the church to where sick person lies, a candle should be carried in front of the Mysteries. Once at the sick person's bedside he uses the tweezers to take a particle of the Mysteries from the box and place it in the chalice. He then pours a small amount of wine into the chalice which softens the dried particle as he hears the sick person's confession. Then, after saying the Prayers Before Communion, he administers Holy Communion to the sick person. He then says the Prayers of Thanksgiving After Communion.

It is forbidden to celebrate the full Divine Liturgy on weekdays during Great Lent. For this reason, the faithful receive the reserved Mysteries on Wednesdays, Fridays, and feast days in a service known as the Liturgy of the Presanctified Gifts. This Liturgy is also served on the first three days of Holy Week (but not on Good Friday). On the previous Sunday, during the Divine Liturgy the priest will have consecrated an extra Lamb for each Presanctified Liturgy that will be served in the coming week. He then moistens the extra Lambs with the Blood of Christ, just as he did for the Communion of the sick, except he does not cut the Lambs into small pieces. The Lamb will be cut and distributed to the clergy and faithful during the Presanctified Liturgy. During the Great Entrance at the Presanctified Liturgy, the Mysteries are carried in a silent procession, as all prostrate themselves in adoration.

The Christian East has no concept of the adoration of the Blessed Sacrament outside of the context of Holy Communion, or of the rite of Benediction which developed in the West after the Great Schism of 1054.

== Bibliography ==
- A New Eusebius; J. Stevenson (SPCK, 1968)
- Oxford Dictionary of the Christian Church; F. L. Cross (Oxford, 1958)
- History of the Book of Common Prayer; F. Procter and W. H. Frere (Macmillan, 1965) ("First edition, 1855 ... revised and rewritten by Walter Howard Frere, 1901; 3rd impression, with corrections and alterations ... 1961.")
