= Xerophagy =

Form of Christian fasting

Xerophagy ("dry eating", from Greek ξηρός "dry" and φαγεῖν "eat") is a form of ancient Christian fasting in which a believer fasts from food and water until sunset, as well as abstains from meat, alcohol and succulent fruits for the one meal that is consumed after sunset; the early Church's Apostolic Constitutions enjoin for the meal eaten after sundown: bread, salt, water, nuts, as well as vegetables cooked with water and salt. The early Christian apologist Tertullian references this manner of fasting in his works.

The injunction of xerophagy was set forth in the Apostolic Constitutions for the season of Lent, and on the last two days of Holy Week (Good Friday and Holy Saturday), "nothing whatsoever is to be eaten."

The Montanist Christians practiced xerophagy twice a year for fourteen days.

It is observed in Eastern Christianity during Great Lent and certain other fasts. "Dry" primarily refers to food cooked without oil. In the Greek tradition, "oil" generally refers to olive oil, but in Slavic tradition, this also extends to butter and to other types of vegetable oil. Eastern Orthodox and Oriental Orthodox denominations encourage xerophagy during Holy Week and on Good Friday, the one meal may include "bread, with a little water, tea or fruit-juice, but not until sunset".

Outside of the regular calendar of Christian fasts, xerophagy may also be used as a penance for specific transgressions. For example, in the 35 Canons of Saint John the Faster, the penance for any monk caught in homosexual acts includes a xerophagic diet for three years along with other penances.

== See also ==
- Black Fast
- Christian vegetarianism
- Daniel Fast
- Lenten supper
