= Khāne-takānī =

Iranian tradition

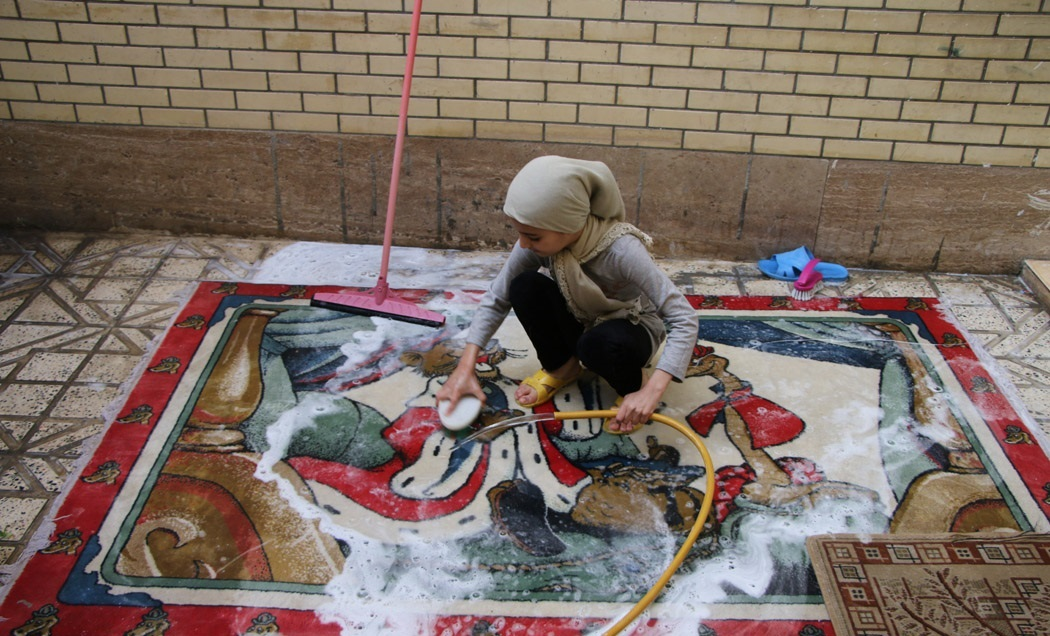
An Iranian girl washes her rug in house yard, Nowruz 2018.

Khāne-takānī (Persian: خانه‌تکانی, lit. 'shaking the house') is an Iranian tradition of spring cleaning and part of the Norouz festival.

It usually involves washing carpets, painting the house, and cleaning the yard and attic, This concept emerged from the Zoroastrians' idea of purifying with cleanliness as a measure for keeping Evil away from the kingdom of Good.

Symbolically, "Khane tekani" signals to the spirits of the ancestors that their kin are ready and willing to entertain them. In other words, they are invited to descend on their previous homes to help them nourish the growth of the sabzeh, the main source of their sustenance which has been depleted during the long and cold days of winter".
