= Penitential Act =

Form of confession of sinfulness practiced in Roman Catholicism

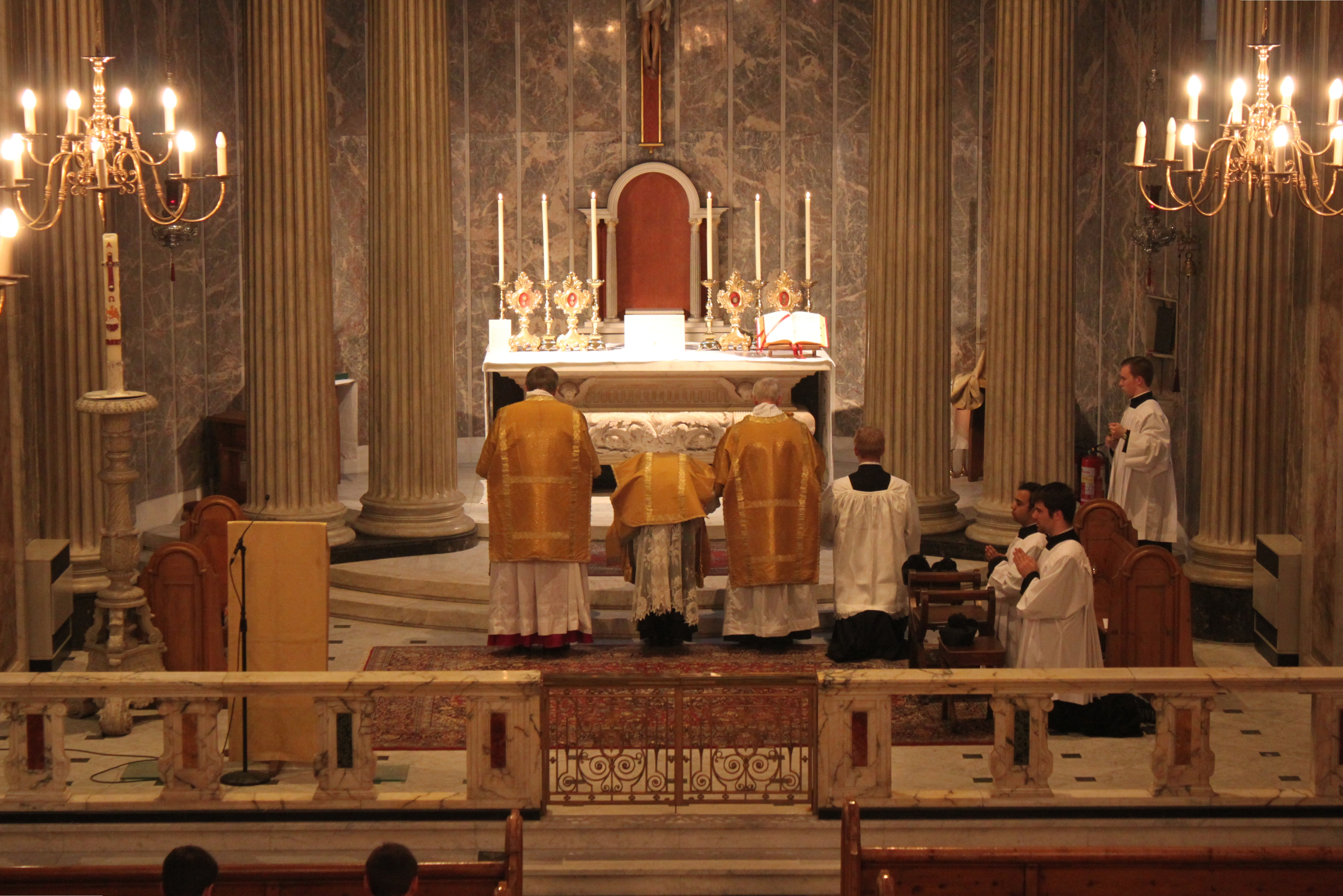
Confiteor said by the priest at a Solemn Mass

The Penitential Act is a Christian form of general confession of sinfulness that normally takes place at the beginning of the celebration of Mass in the Roman Rite of the Catholicism, as well as in Lutheranism. In Anglicanism, it is said as part of the Eucharist, but it is not considered an official sacrament.

The term used in the original text of the Roman Missal (in Latin) is Actus Paenitentialis. In the English translation of the Roman Missal used from 1973 to 2011, it was called the Penitential Rite. The Penitential Act, also known as A "Brief Order of Confession", takes place at the start of Lutheran Divine Service, and may include an Absolution, giving it sacramental weight.

== Roman Rite ==
In the Order of Mass of the Roman Rite, which is the most widespread liturgical rite in the Catholic Church, the introductory part of Mass normally includes a Penitential Act after the making of the sign of the cross and the priest's greeting. The Roman Missal provides three forms. The priest begins each with an exhortation to acknowledge one's sinfulness as preparation for celebrating the sacred mysteries and he ends it with the prayer, "May almighty God have mercy on us, forgive us our sins, and bring us to everlasting life", a deprecatory absolution, as distinct from the declarative or indicative absolution, "I absolve you from your sins". Between these two interventions by the priest, sinfulness is acknowledged in one of three ways;

1. Recitation of the Confiteor;
2. A short prayer, beginning with "Have mercy on us, O Lord", recited alternately by priest and people;
3. A short litany spoken or sung, not necessarily by the priest, to each of whose three variable invocations or tropes the people respond with the acclamation Kyrie, eleison or Christe, eleison (Lord, have mercy; Christ, have mercy)

The Penitential Act is followed by the Kyrie eleison chant (unless the third form of the Penitential Act has been chosen) and on solemnities and feasts by the Gloria.

If certain celebrations are combined with Mass, then the Penitential Act and other parts of the Introductory Rites are omitted or performed in a different way. An example is the Mass of Ash Wednesday, in which the Penitential Act is replaced by the blessing and imposition of ashes after the homily.

"On Sundays, especially in the Season of Easter, in place of the customary Penitential Act, from time to time the Blessing and Sprinkling of Water to recall Baptism may take place."

=== Tridentine Mass ===
The Tridentine Roman Missal (editions from 1570 to 1962), which does not use the term "Penitential Act", has an equivalent, within the Prayers at the Foot of the Altar, in the Confiteor:

The priest says:

Confiteor Deo omnipotenti, beatæ Mariæ semper Virgini, beato Michaeli Archangelo, beato Ioanni Baptistæ, sanctis Apostolis Petro et Paulo, omnibus Sanctis, et vobis, fratres: quia peccavi nimis cogitatione, verbo et opere: mea culpa, mea culpa, mea maxima culpa. Ideo precor beatam Mariam semper Virginem, beatum Michaelem Archangelum, beatum Ioannem Baptistam, sanctos Apostolos Petrum et Paulum, omnes Sanctos, et vos, fratres, orare pro me ad Dominum Deum nostrum.

Translation:

I confess to Almighty God, to blessed Mary ever Virgin, to blessed Michael the Archangel, to blessed John the Baptist, to the holy Apostles Peter and Paul, to all the Saints, and to you, brethren, that I have sinned exceedingly in thought, word and deed: through my fault, through my fault, through my most grievous fault. Therefore I beseech blessed Mary ever Virgin, blessed Michael the Archangel, blessed John the Baptist, the holy Apostles Peter and Paul, all the Saints, and you, brethren, to pray for me to the Lord our God.

Deacon and subdeacon at a solemn Mass, server(s) at a low Mass, or server(s) and people at a dialogue Mass respond:

Misereátur tui omnípotens Deus, et dimíssis peccátis tuis, perdúcat te ad vitam ætérnam.

Translation:

May Almighty God have mercy on you, forgive you your sins and bring you to everlasting life.

The Confiteor is then repeated by the others, replacing vobis fratres and vos fratres (you, brethren) with tibi pater and te pater (you, Father). The priest responds with the Misereatur is spoken by the priest replacing tui with vestri, tuis with vestris, and te with vos. The priest responds with two prayers: Misereátur vestri omnípotens Deus, et dimíssis peccátis vestris, perdúcat vos ad vitam ætérnam (May Almighty God have mercy on you, forgive you your sins and bring you to everlasting life) and (making the sign of the cross) Indulgéntiam, absolutiónem, et remissiónem peccatórum nostrórum, tríbuat nobis omnípotens et miséricors Dóminus (May the Almighty and Merciful Lord grant us pardon, absolution, and remission of our sins).

In the original Tridentine Roman Missal (1570), the Misereatur prayer added the adjective omnibus ("all") to the phrase dimissis peccatis tuis/vestris ("forgive you [all] your sins").

== Usage in Lutheranism ==
=== Beliefs ===
The Lutheran Mass (Divine Service) begins with a brief order of confession. The pastor and congregation say a Confiteor and the pastor may make a Declaration of Grace or an Absolution. If an absolution is spoken, the brief order of confession is understood to be sacramental. However, if private, individual confession is a common practice in a congregation, the brief order of confession may be omitted during the celebration of the Mass. Auricular confession occurs in private, with the penitent enumerating his sins to the priest, who then absolves him/her of the same.

As in the Roman Rite, a Thanksgiving for Baptism (similar to the Blessing and Sprinkling of Water) may replace the brief order of confession.

=== Formula ===
Below is an example, taken from the Lutheran Service Book, Divine Service Setting I:

Pastor: "If we say we have no sin, we deceive ourselves, and the truth is not in us."
People: "But if we confess our sins, God who is faithful and just will forgive our sins and cleanse us from all unrighteousness."
Pastor: "Let us then confess our sins to God our Father."
People: "Most merciful God, we confess that we are by nature sinful and unclean. We have sinned against you in thought, word, and deed, by what we have done and by what we have left undone. We have not loved You with our whole heart; we have not loved our neighbors as ourselves. We justly deserve Your present and eternal punishment. For the sake of Your Son, Jesus Christ, have mercy on us. Forgive us, renew us, and lead us, so that we may delight in Your will and walk in Your ways to the glory of your Holy Name. Amen."
Pastor (Declaration of Grace): "In the mercy of almighty God, Jesus Christ was given to die for us, and for His sake God forgives us all our sins. To those who believe in Jesus Christ He gives the power to become the children of God and bestows on them the Holy Spirit. May the Lord, who has begun this good work in us, bring it to completion in the day of our Lord Jesus Christ."
OR Pastor (Absolution): "Almighty God in His mercy has given His Son to die for you and for His sake forgives you all your sins. As a called and ordained servant of Christ, and by His authority, I therefore forgive you all your sins in the name of the Father and of the Son and of the Holy Spirit."
People: "Amen."
