= Altar (Catholic Church) =

Liturgical structure

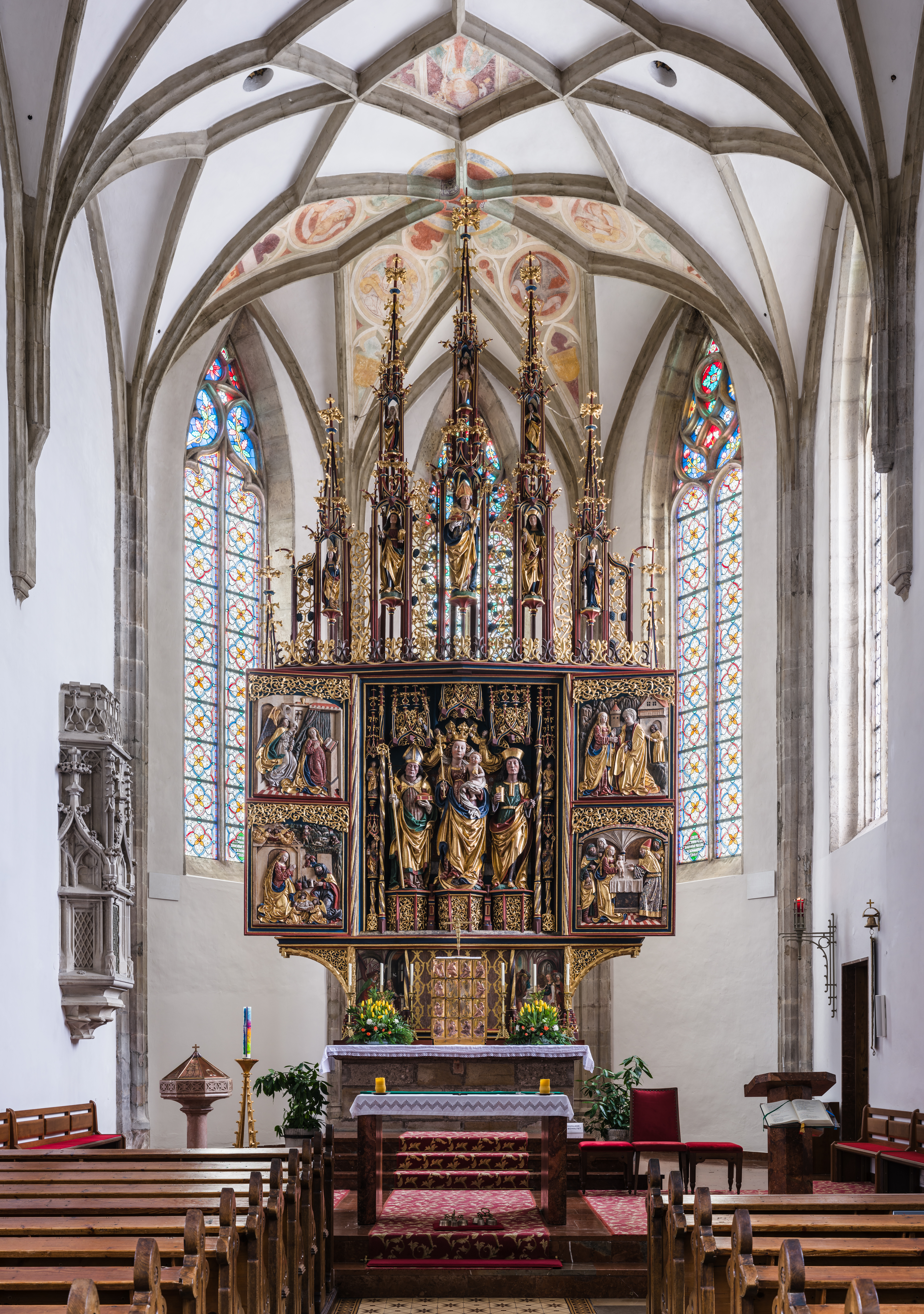
The altar of the parish church of Gampern, Upper Austria

In the Catholic Church, an altar is a table or structure on which Mass is celebrated. Relics of martyrs or other saints are commonly set into the altar. Typically centrally located in the sanctuary, the altar is to be the focus of attention in the church. At the beginning of the Roman Rite of Mass, the priest first of all reverences the altar with a kiss and only after that goes to the chair at which he presides over the Introductory Rites and the Liturgy of the Word. Except in a Solemn Mass, a priest celebrating the Tridentine Mass remains at the altar the whole time after saying the prayers at the foot of the altar.

The rite of dedication of a church and of the altar points out that the celebration of the Eucharist is "the principal and the most ancient part of the whole rite, because the celebration of the eucharist is in the closest harmony with the rite of the dedication of a church", and "the eucharist, which sanctifies the hearts of those who receive it, in a sense consecrates the altar and the place of celebration, as the ancient Fathers of the Church often assert: 'This altar should be an object of awe: by nature it is stone, but it is made holy when it receives the body of Christ.'"

In Greek and some other languages used in the Byzantine Rite, the same word (βωμός) is used for an altar (in general) and for the area surrounding it; that is to say, the entire sanctuary. To refer unambiguously to the altar itself the terms "Holy Table" (Ἁγία Τράπεζα) or "Throne" (Church Slavonic: Prestól) are used.

== Obligation ==
Augustin Joseph Schulte says that Pope Sixtus II (257–259) was the first to prescribe that Mass should be celebrated on an altar, and that there are accounts according to which Lucian of Antioch celebrated Mass on his breast whilst in prison (312), and Theodore, Bishop of Tyre on the hands of his deacons.

== Position ==
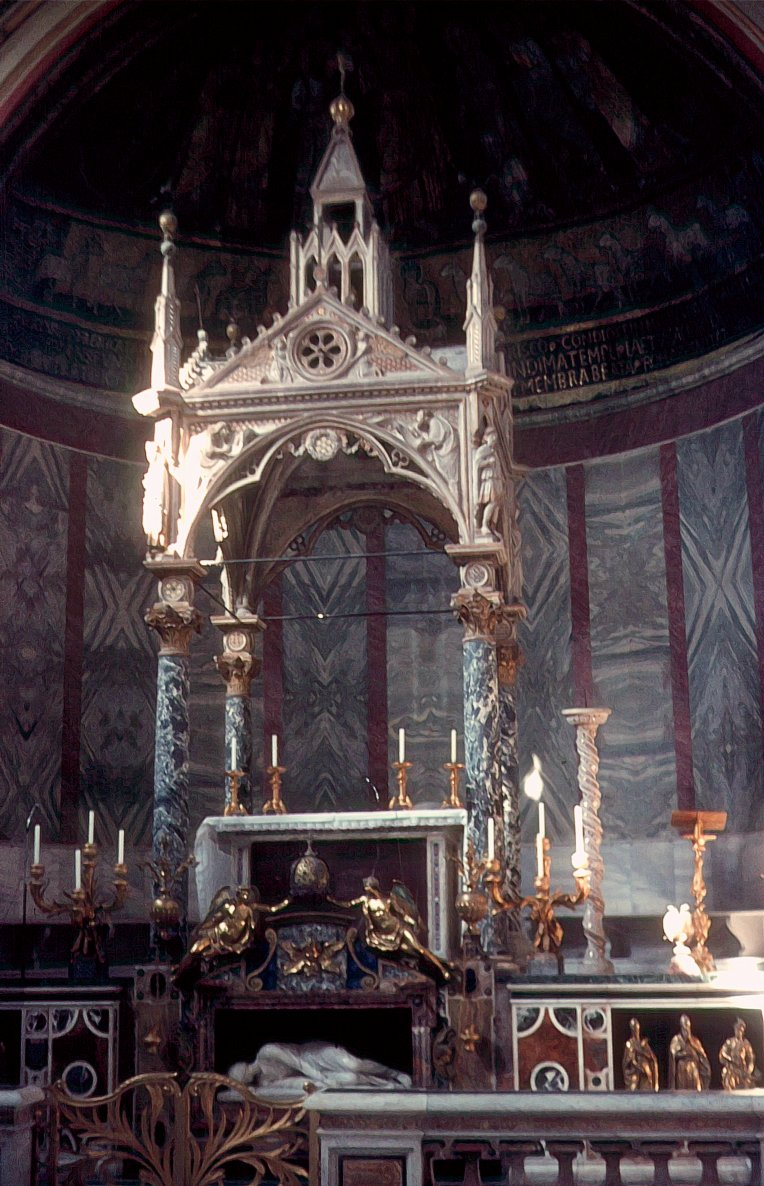
Altar of Santa Cecilia in Trastevere, as arranged in 1700. The altar is at the west end of the church. Historically, the priest, looking east, faced the altar and the people.

Early Christians faced east at prayer, a practice witnessed to by Clement of Alexandria (c. 150 – c. 215), Tertullian (c. 160 – c. 220), and Origen (c. 185 – 253). Churches were generally built with an east–west axis. In the earliest churches in Rome the altar stood at the west end and the priest stood at the western side of the altar facing east and facing the people and the doors of the church. Examples are the Constantinian St. Peter's Basilica and the original Basilica of Saint Paul Outside the Walls. In the East, early churches had the altar at the east end and the priest, facing east, stood at the western side of the altar, with his back to the people and the doors. This later became the common practice also in western Europe. It was adopted in Rome in the 8th or 9th century.

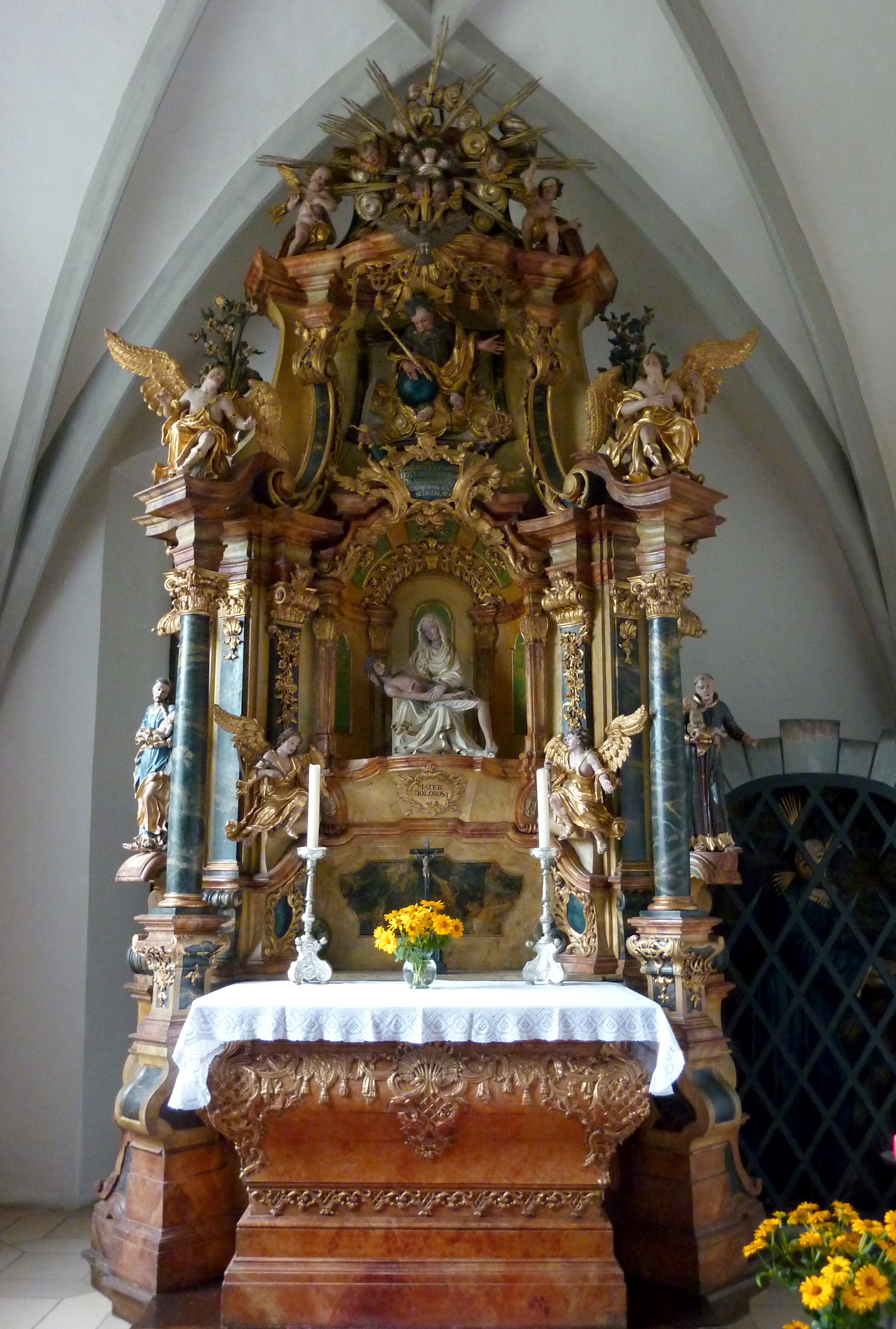
1742 Rococo altar in Kirchheim am Ries, Germany. The priest and the people would be on the same side of the altar, even if the altar is at the west end of the church.

The churches that Christians built after the legalization of their religion in the Roman Empire were not modelled on pagan temples, which were not intended to accommodate large numbers of people. The model used was that of the public basilicas that served for meetings such as sessions of law courts. These were generally spacious, and the interior was divided by two or four rows of pillars, forming a central nave and side aisles. At the end was a raised platform, often situated in an apse, with seats for the magistrates. In basilica-style Christian churches the apse was reserved for the bishop and his clergy; the faithful occupied the centre and the side aisles, and between the clergy and people stood the altar.

== Material ==
The earliest altars for celebrating the Christian Eucharist were of wood and identical in form with ordinary house tables, as was doubtless used at the Last Supper. The only such ancient wooden table still preserved is in the Lateran Basilica, and fragments of another are preserved in the Santa Pudenziana church in Rome. A tradition that lacks convincing evidence says that Peter celebrated the Eucharist on both. Optatus of Mileve reproves the Donatists for breaking up and using for firewood the altars of the Catholic churches, and Augustine of Hippo reports that Bishop Maximianus was beaten with the wood of the altar under which he had taken refuge.

Helena (c. 250 – c. 330) gave golden altars ornamented with precious stones to the original Church of the Holy Sepulchre. Pulcheria (398 or 399 – 453), sister of Theodosius II, presented an altar of gold to the Basilica of Constantinople. Popes Sixtus III (432–440) and Hilary (461–468) presented several altars of silver to the churches of Rome.

Gregory of Nyssa (c. 335 – c. 395) speaks of the consecration of an altar made of stone (De Christi Baptismate). Since wood is subject to decay, the baser metals to corrosion, and the more precious metals were too expensive, stone became in course of time the ordinary material for an altar. The earliest decree of a council prescribing that an altar which is to be consecrated should be of stone is that of the provincial council of Epeaune (Pamiers), France, in 517.

The present discipline of the Latin Church distinguishes between the "table" of an altar (the top) and the supports or base. The latter, provided it is dignified and solid, may be of any material. On the other hand, "in keeping with the Church’s traditional practice and with what the altar signifies, the table of a fixed altar should be of stone and indeed of natural stone", except where the episcopal conference authorizes the use of another material (such as wood) that "is dignified, solid and well-crafted." "A movable altar may be constructed of any noble and solid material suited to liturgical use, according to the traditions and usages of the different regions."

In Eastern Christianity (including the Eastern Catholic Churches) the use of stone, wood or metal is permitted.

== Form ==
The usage of celebrating the Eucharist on the tombs of martyrs is by the Liber Pontificalis ascribed, probably mistakenly, to Pope Felix I (269–274). According to Johann Peter Kirsch the usage is likely to have preceded Pope Felix and to have concerned the celebration of Mass privately in the underground cemeteries known as the catacombs: the solemn celebration of the martyrs took place in the above-ground basilicas built over their place of burial.

Within the catacomb crypts the Eucharist could be celebrated on a stone slab placed over the grave or sarcophagus of one or more martyrs within a space hollowed out of the tufa walls so as to form an arch-like niche. Both in the catacombs and in the above-ground churches the altar could also be a square or oblong block of stone resting on one or more columns (up to six) or on a masonry structure that enclosed the relics of martyrs. Instead of masonry, upright stone slabs could be used, thus forming, with the top slab, a stone chest containing the relics. This no doubt brought about both a change of form, from that of a simple table to that of a chest or tomb.

Usually an altar should be fixed and ritually dedicated, but a mere blessing is sufficient for a movable altar. In a church a fixed altar is appropriate, but in other places set aside for sacred celebrations the altar may be movable.

== Relics ==
The practice of celebrating the Eucharist over the graves of martyrs is probably the origin of the rule that demanded that every altar must contain the relics of martyrs.

The General Instruction of the Roman Missal directs that relics should be verified as authentic, but that they do not have to be the remains of those who died for the faith.

The Caeremoniale Episcoporum adds: "Such relics should be of a size sufficient for them to be recognized as parts of human bodies; hence excessively small relics of one or more saints must not be placed beneath the altar. The greatest care must be taken to determine whether the relics in question are authentic; it is better for an altar to be dedicated without relics than to have relics of doubtful authenticity placed beneath it. A reliquary must not be placed upon the altar or set into the table of the altar; it must be placed beneath the table of the altar, as the design of the altar permits."

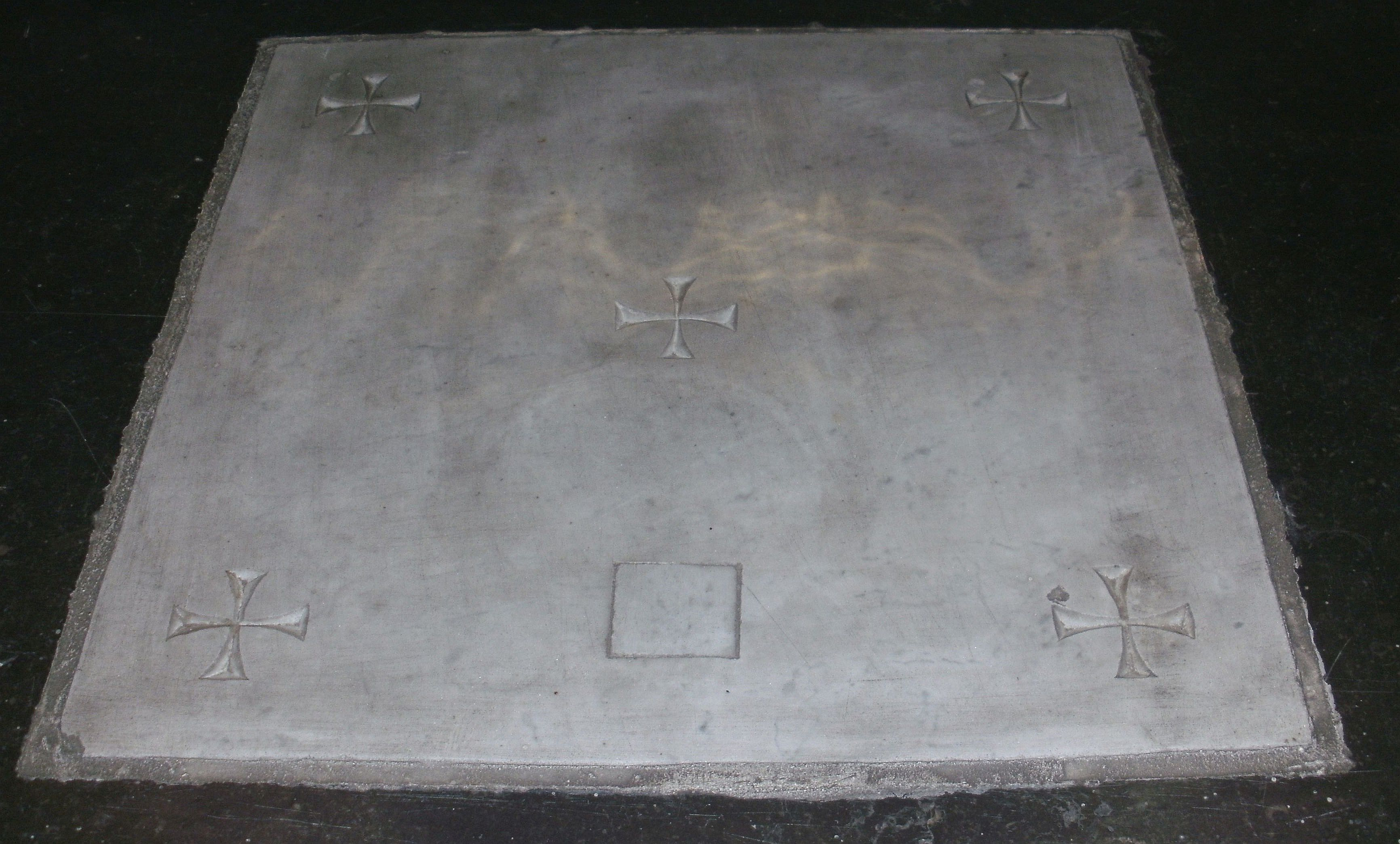
Altar stone with sepulchrum at Sint-Niklaaskerk, Mesen, Belgium

In earlier centuries minute portions of relics were inserted into the table of the altar and also into the altar stones that at that time were called movable altars. The cavity into which they were placed was called the sepulchrum (Latin for 'tomb'). The relics could be of several saints, but two had to be martyrs until 1906, when the Congregation of Rites decided that it was sufficient to enclose relics of two canonized saints of whom one was a martyr. The relics were placed in a reliquary of lead, silver, or gold, large enough to contain also three grains of incense and a small attestation of consecration on a piece of parchment. In an altar stone, the relics were inserted directly, without a reliquary. There were precise rules also about where exactly in the altar the relics were to be placed and about the stone cover for the cavity.

In ancient churches in which the altar is built over the tomb of a saint or over the relics that have been placed there, a niche below the altar offered a view of the tomb or reliquary and allowed the faithful to touch it and to place in contact with it that would then be venerated as second-class relics. The best known example is the Niche of the Palliums in St. Peter's Basilica in the Vatican. It is now approached by descending steps, since the present floor is considerably higher than that of the original basilica. Other churches also have in front of the altar a similar semicircular hollow area, known as the confessio, even if the altar is not built over a holy tomb, as in the Lateran Basilica and the Basilica di Santa Maria Maggiore.

== Surroundings ==
Modern altar at Church of San Giovanni Battista, Mogno, 1996

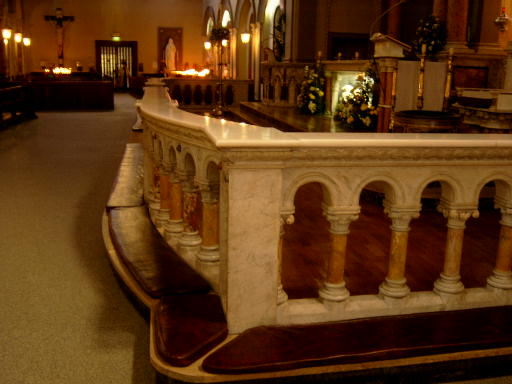
Altar rails in St. Teresa's Carmelite Church, Dublin

According to the General Instruction of the Roman Missal the altar should be located in the sanctuary and set apart from the rest of the church in some way.

The sanctuary or chancel or presbytery, as well as being elevated above the floor level of the rest of the church, is often, though less frequently than in the past, demarcated by altar rails (sometimes called a communion rail).

Even within an elevated sanctuary, the altar itself is often placed on a higher platform set off by one or more steps. The platform is known as the predella.

The altar may also be marked with a surmounting ciborium, sometimes called a baldachin.

As well as the altar, the sanctuary contains the credence table, the ambo and the seats for the clergy.

=== Steps ===
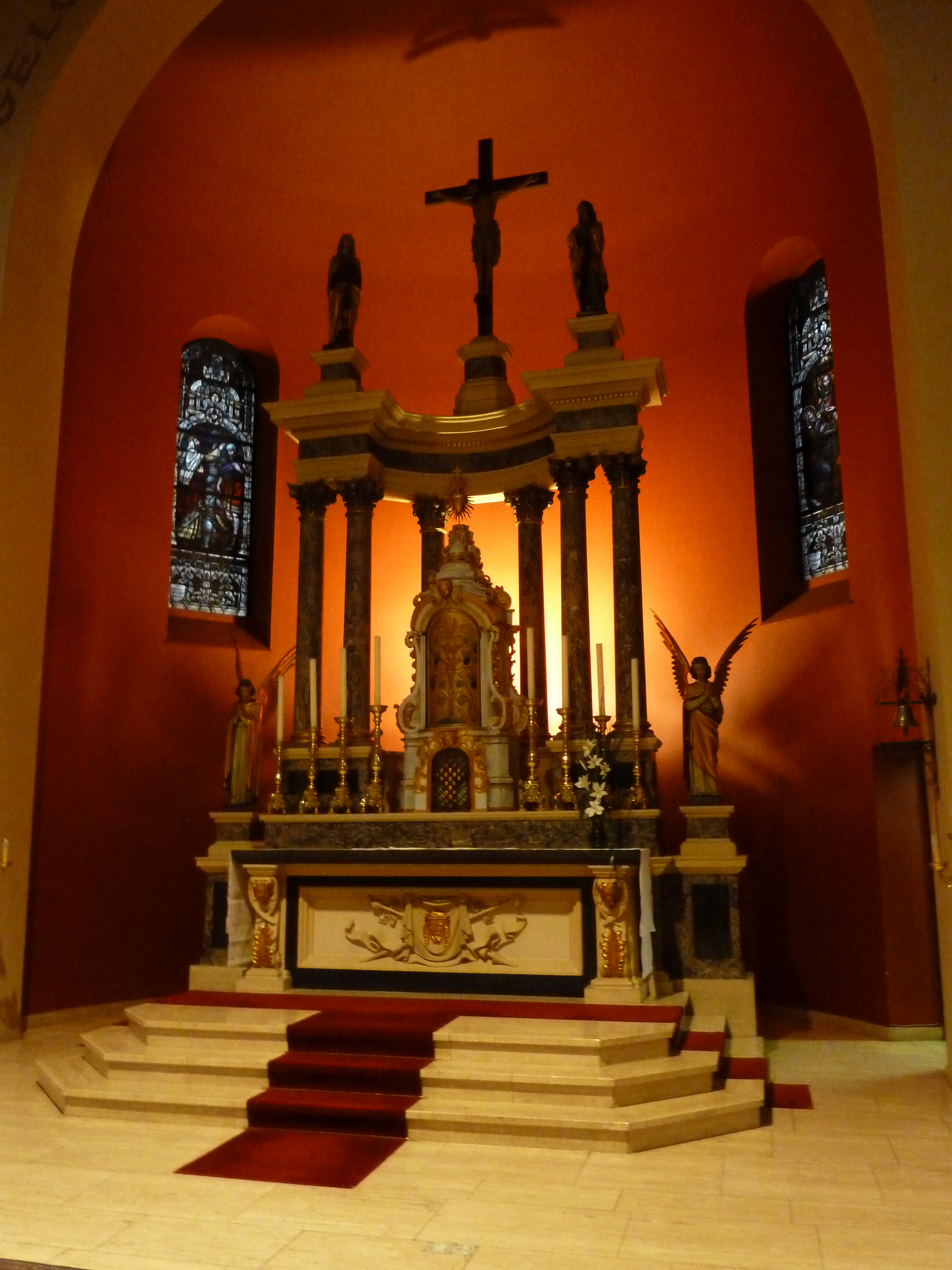
Saint Remigius Church, Simpelveld, Netherlands

Later, the number of steps was increased. It became the norm that the main altar of a church should be raised above the level of the sanctuary by three steps, while side altars had a single step. The papal altar in St Peter's Basilica in the Vatican is approached by seven steps.

An odd number was always chosen. Since it was considered proper to use the right foot in taking a first step, this ensured that the priest, having ascended the first of the steps with his right foot would also enter the predella (the platform or footpace on which the altar stood) with his right foot. The same rule applied to pre-Christian temples, as indicated by Vitruvius in his De architectura. The Satyricon attributed to Petronius also mentions the custom of dextro pede (right foot first).

In late medieval and Tridentine times, elaborate rules were developed not only about the number of steps, but also about the material used, the height of each step, the breadth of the tread, the covering with carpets or rugs (both of which were to be removed from the stripping of the altars on Holy Thursday until just before the Mass on Holy Saturday morning, and the carpet alone at a Requiem Mass), and the colour and design of the carpet.

=== Canopy ===
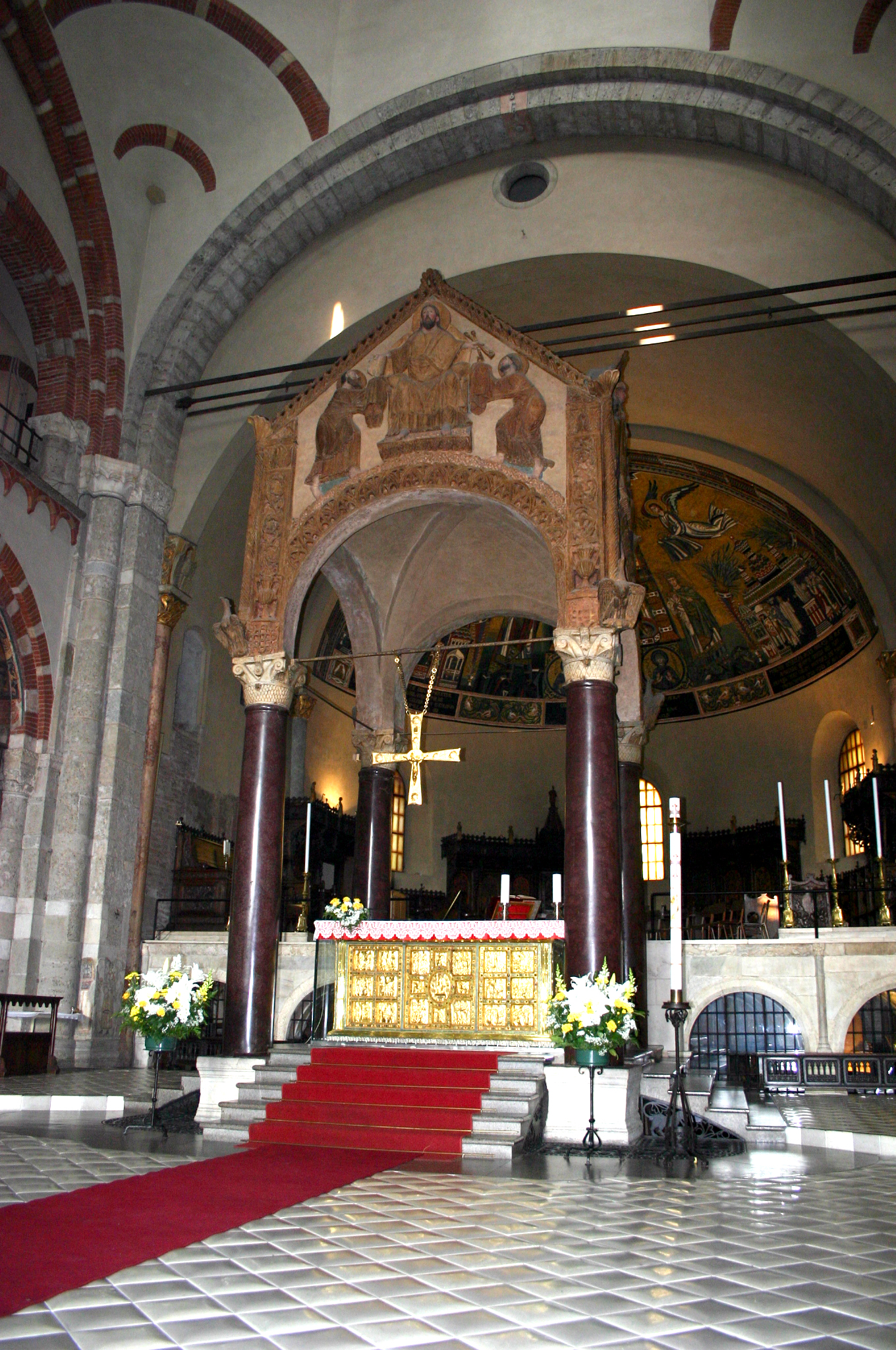
Ciborium over the altar of the Basilica of Sant'Ambrogio in Milan. Note curtain rods.

A canopy placed over an altar is called a ciborium (a word of which "civory" is a variant form) or baldachin. Gian Lorenzo Bernini's St. Peter's Baldachin is the most famous of these structures.

Early extant ciboria in Ravenna and Rome usually consist of four columns topped by a pyramidal or gabled roof. On some, rods between the columns indicate that they were provided with curtains that could be closed at certain points of the liturgy, as is the custom in the Armenian and Coptic Rites. Some later churches without a ciborium hung a curtain on the wall behind the altar, with two curtain-bearing rods extending at the sides of the altar. From at latest the 4th century, the altar was covered from the view of the congregation at points during Mass by altar curtains hanging from rods supported by a ciborium, riddel posts, or some other arrangement. This practice declined as the introduction of other structures that screened the altar, such as the iconostasis in the East and rood screen and pulpitum in the West, meant that the congregation could barely see the altar anyway.

In early times, before the break-up of the Roman Empire exposed such objects to sacking and looting, the consecrated bread of the Eucharist (the reserved sacrament) was kept in a gold or silver dove, sometimes enclosed in a silver tower, suspended by fine chains from the ciborium that sheltered the altar.

Instead of a four-column ciborium a movable canopy (called a tester) was in some churches suspended from the ceiling above the altar or a fixed canopy attached to the wall was employed.

Use of some such canopy over every altar was decreed in documents of the Tridentine period, but the decrees were generally ignored even in that period.

=== Ledge ===
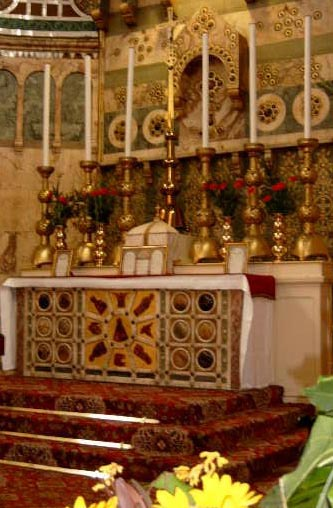
Altar of Newman University Church, Dublin, with an altar ledge occupying the only space between it and the wall

The Roman Missal of Pope Pius V, whose use was made generally obligatory throughout the Latin Church in 1570 laid down that, for Mass, only items used in that celebration should be placed on the altar. These include a cross should be placed in the middle of it, flanked by at least two candlesticks with lit candles.

The front of these steps was sometimes painted and decorated. Thus the gradini of Brunelleschi's church of Santo Spirito, Florence displayed scenes from the Passion of Christ.

=== Altarpiece ===
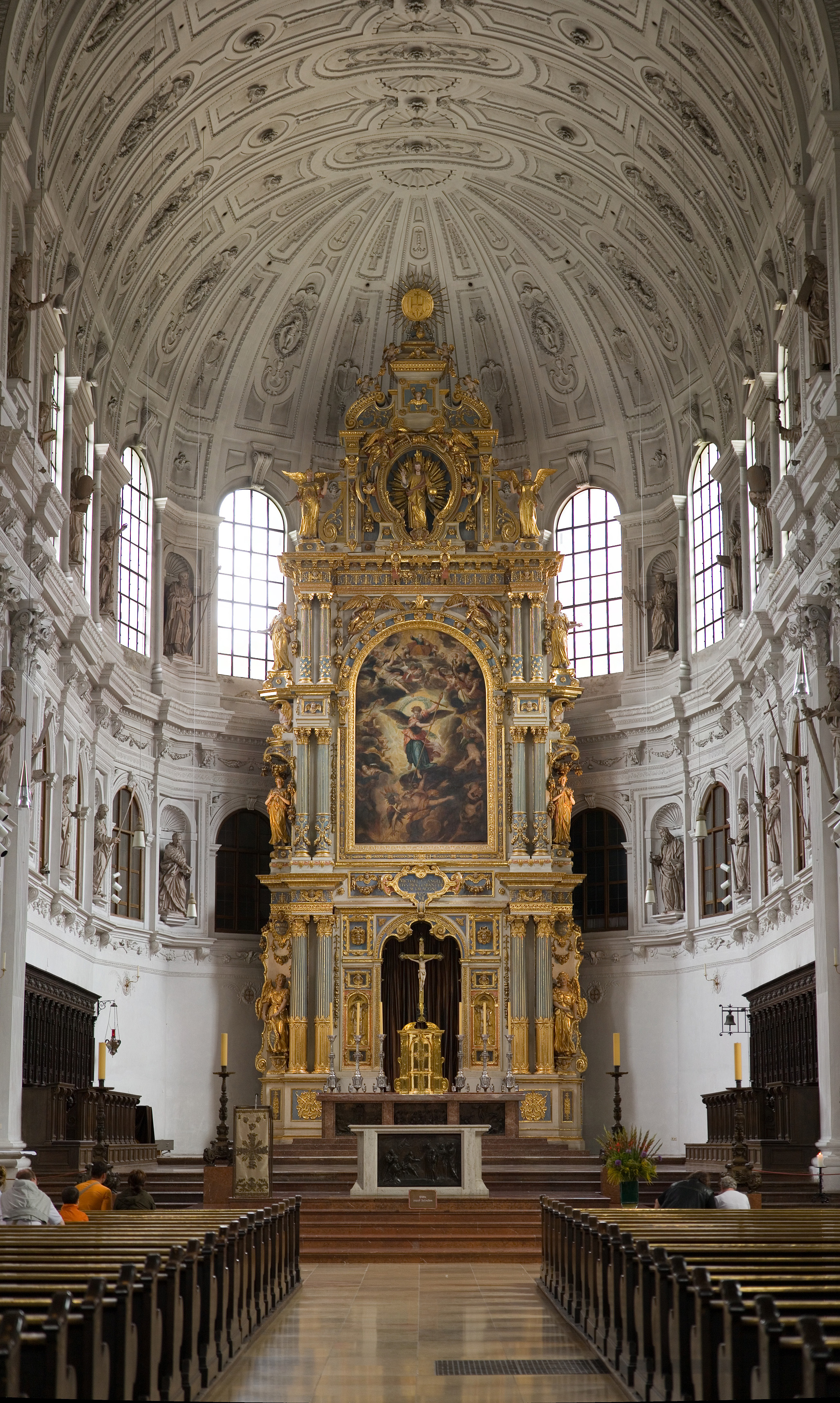
Gigantic reredos dwarfing the altar of St. Michael's Church, Munich

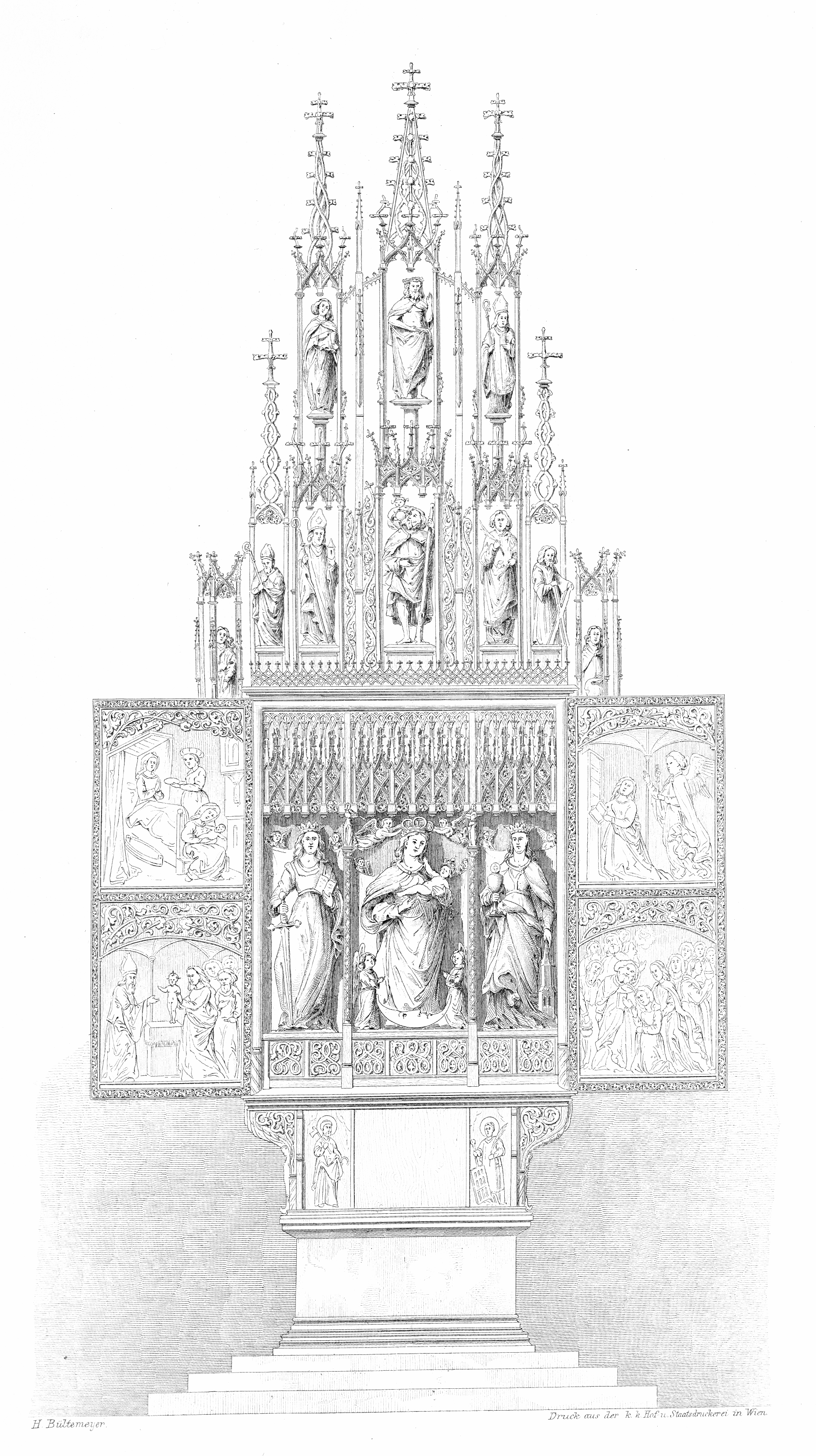
Late Gothic triptych over altar, Hallstatt, woodcut 1858

There has been no church legislation on these artworks, which vary enormously in form. The terminology, too, is somewhat fluid.

The term "altarpiece" is applied very widely to them.

== Cloth coverings ==
The altar should be covered by at least one white altar cloth when the Mass is celebrated. The pre-1969 regulations prescribed three white altar cloths, the topmost being long enough to reach the ground at both ends. 19th and early 20th-century regulations required that the cloths be of linen or hemp and not of any other material, even if of equivalent or higher quality.

In addition, it was customary to place directly on the altar, beneath the three obligatory altar cloths, a cloth waxed on one side that was called the chrismale or cere cloth and that served to keep the altar cloths dry.

When the altar is not used for a liturgical service, the altar cloths may be protected against being stained or soiled by placing over them an altar protector or altar cover made of cloth, baize or velvet large enough to hang down a little on all sides. This is known as the vesperale or stragulum.

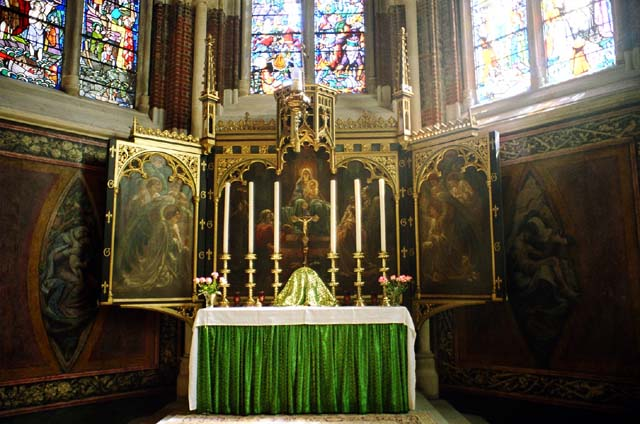
Altar with drapery antependium in the style of Catholic churches of the 19th and early 20th century

When in the period immediately preceding the late twentieth century altars were generally built attached to or close to a wall, it became customary to cover with drapery the front of the altar, the only part visible to the congregation. This drapery was called the antependium or altar frontal, terms often applied also to sculptural or other ornamentation of the altar front itself. It covered the whole front of the altar, partial coverings being forbidden. It was obligatory unless the altar front was particularly artistic, and even in such cases it should be used on more solemn occasions. Its origin was thought to have derived from the curtains or veils of silk or other precious material hanging over the open space under the altar table to preserve the shrine of saints deposited there. In the Middle Ages a similar function was performed by an "altar stole", an ornament in the shape of the ends of a stole attached to the front of the altar.

== Candles and candlesticks ==
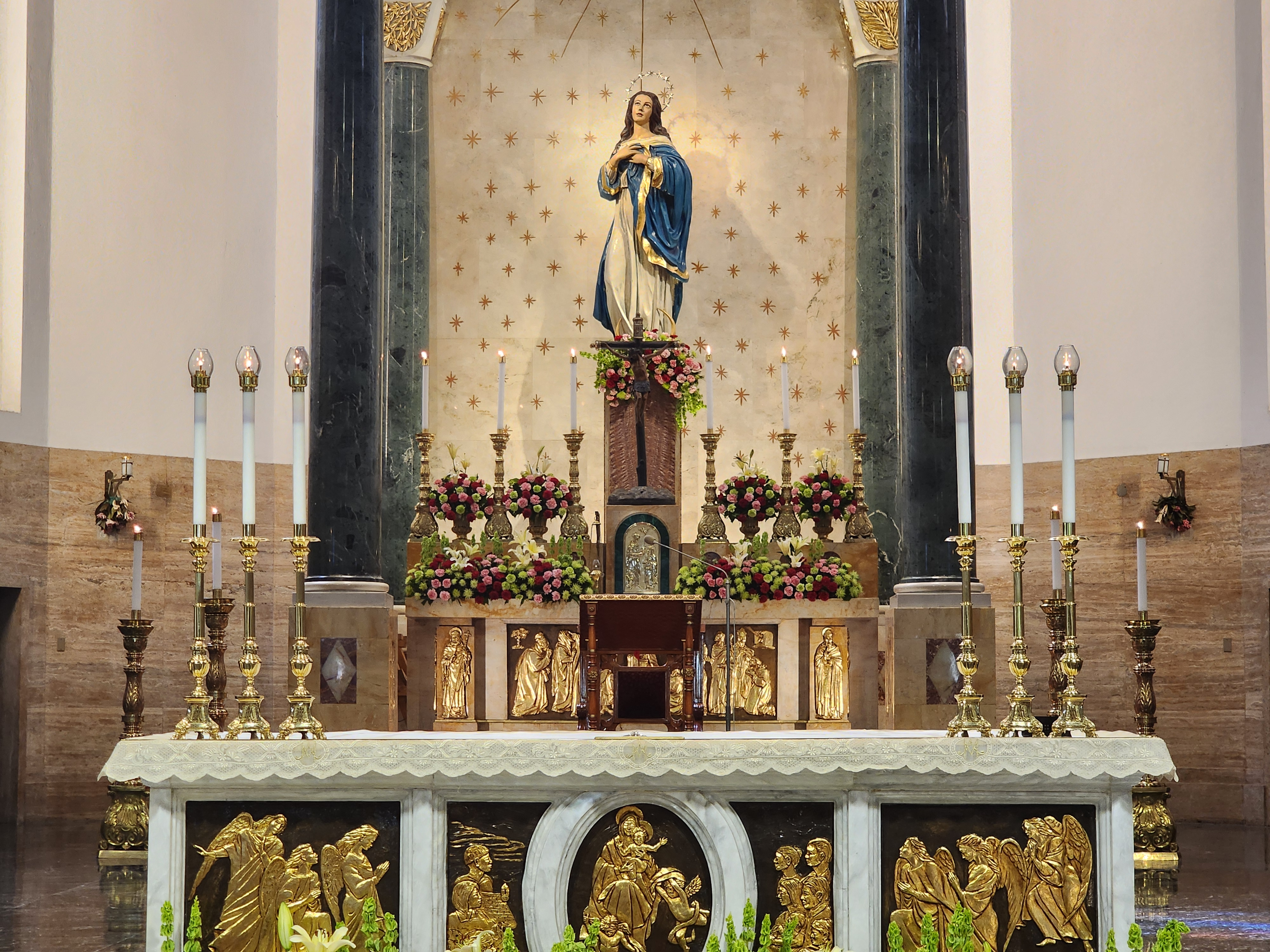
Six candlesticks with lighted candles for a regular Sunday Mass (Manila Cathedral)

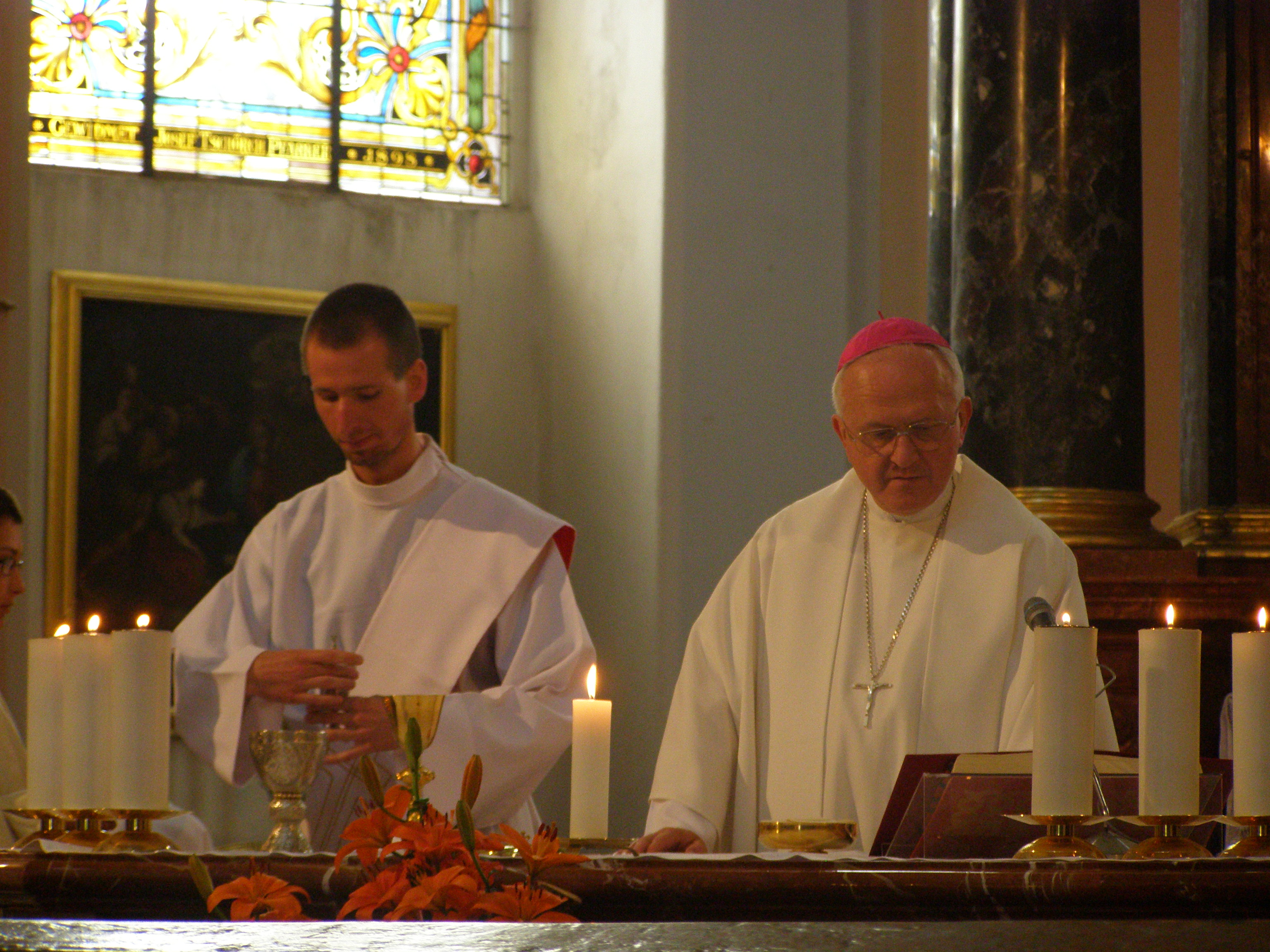
Seven lighted candles at a Pontifical Mass celebrated by the diocesan bishop (Jablonné v Podještědí)

According to the General Instruction of the Roman Missal describes what type of candles and candlesticks may be used on the alter, as well as delimiting how many may be used. While only two lighted candles are now obligatory and may be placed beside the altar rather than on it, the pre-1969 rubrics (which did not envisage the candles being brought in the Entrance procession) required that they be on the altar itself (in practice, however, they were often placed on the altar shelf instead) and should be four at a Low Mass celebrated by a bishop, four or six at a Missa cantata, six at a Solemn Mass and seven at a Pontifical High Mass. In the last case, the seventh candle was not lit if the bishop was celebrating outside his own diocese. There were also rules, developed over centuries, about the material from which the candlesticks were to be made and about the relative heights of the candles. Candles appear not to have been placed on the altar before the twelfth century, but earlier writings speak of acolytes carrying candlesticks, which, however, they placed on the floor of the sanctuary or near the corners of the altar, as is still the custom in the Eastern Orthodox Church.

Liturgical books of the same pre-1969 period speak of the placing of flowers (even good-quality artificial ones) in vases between the candlesticks on the altar. Presently, a moderate amount of flowers are placed around, but not on, the altar. Other items used to celebrate Mass are placed on the altar instead.

The candlesticks consist of five principal parts: the foot, the stem, the knob, the bowl to catch drippings, and the pricket on which the candle is placed. Altar candlesticks may be made of any material suitable for candlesticks, with the exception that silvered candlesticks may not be used on Good Friday. They may never be used for funeral celebrations.

== Tabernacle ==
Tabernacles are sometimes placed prominently on the altar, though in general they're placed. It should be constructed in such a way to preserve the holiness of the hosts. Before its first use, it should be blessed. Preferably, it should be located in a spot apart from where Mass is celebrated.

== See also ==
- Winged altar
- Orientation of churches

== Works cited ==
- The General Instruction of the Roman Missal (PDF), Catholic Bishops’ Conference of England and Wales, 2011
- Dietz, Helen, The Biblical Roots of Church Orientation
