= High Mass =

High Mass may refer to:

- Solemn Mass, Tridentine Mass (Catholic) or Mass of the Lutheran or Anglican tradition, celebrated by a priest with deacon and subdeacon (international and general United States usage)
- Missa cantata, a sung Tridentine Mass celebrated by a priest without deacon and subdeacon (usage among United States Catholics)

== See also ==
- Pontifical High Mass, High Mass celebrated by a Catholic bishop
