= Dialogue Mass =

A Dialogue Mass (in Latin, Missa dialogata; also Missa recitata) is a Low Mass wherein the people recite some parts of the Latin Tridentine Mass.

== History ==
The Dialogue Mass was an intermediate development in the twentieth century liturgical reform that culminated in the reform of the Roman Mass authorised by the Second Vatican Council and promulgated by Pope Paul VI in 1969.

Before the introduction of the Dialogue Mass, verbal participation in a Low Mass by the congregation was minimal, with most responses said solely by the acolytes serving at the altar. This was intended to emphasise the fact that Catholics gathered together to witness and participate in an action (i.e. the sacramental renewal of the sacrifice of Christ on Calvary) rather than merely participate in common prayer which was a hallmark of the Protestant Reformation of the 16th century. The introduction of bilingual hand Missals (Latin-vernacular) occurred in Germany in the 19th century. These allowed the laity to quietly follow the Mass ("Pray the Mass") rather than the traditional practice of saying other private prayers as the priest celebrated. The subsequent step was the people actually saying the Latin responses of the Mass called the Dialogue Mass.

In 1922, the Holy See gave approval to the practice whereby "at least in religious houses and institutions for youth, all people assisting at the Mass make the responses at the same time with the acolytes", a practice that it declared praiseworthy in view of the evident desire expressed in papal documents "to instil into the souls of the faithful a truly Christian and collective spirit, and prepare them for active participation." The practice was already established in Belgium and in Germany before the First World War. Further approval was granted in 1935 and 1958.

However, the Dialogue Mass was not obligatory and there were conflicting statements about the practice from the Vatican. The Decree of the Sacred Congregation of Rites of 1922, shortly after the approval of the Dialogue Mass, replied to the question "May the congregation, assisting at the Sacrifice make the responses in unison, instead of the server?" by saying: "The norm is: Things that in themselves are licit are not always expedient. Owing to the difficulties which may easily arise, as in this case, especially on account of the disturbances which the priests who celebrate and the people who assist may experience, to the disadvantage of the sacred Action and of the rubrics. Hence it is expedient to retain the common usage, as we have several times replied in similar cases."

The Dialogue Mass never became prevalent in English-speaking countries and current celebrations of Tridentine Mass in these countries are in practice rarely structured as a Dialogue Mass. In other countries, such as France and Germany, the Dialogue Mass was met with a greater acceptance as Church hierarchs of these countries in the 1940s and 1950s tended to be more progressive than the generally traditionally-minded bishops of anglophone lands as became evident during the Second Vatican Council. A number of Tridentine Masses currently celebrated in these countries use the Dialogue Mass form.

== Forms of Dialogue Mass ==
The minimum form of Dialogue Mass introduced in 1922 allowed the people to join with the servers in reciting the responses in the Ordinary of the Mass. In addition, the people were allowed to recite those parts of the Ordinary of the Mass that are sung by all at a Missa Cantata: the Gloria, Creed, Sanctus and Agnus Dei, and to recite with the priest the triple "Domine non sum dignus" that he leads as part of Communion of the People. Rarely, the people were also allowed to recite the Introit, Offertory and Communion Antiphons sung by the choir at a Solemn or High Mass. The form to be used in a particular diocese was left to the discretion of the local bishop.

== See also ==
- Deutsche Singmesse
- French Organ Mass
