= Declaration of Grace =

In Lutheranism, the Declaration of Grace is the words that are said in the Divine Service by the pastor, following the congregation reciting the Confiteor. It is not regarded as absolution, rather it is regarded as an "assurance of forgiveness".

== Text ==
Version 1

In the mercy of almighty God, Jesus Christ was given to die for us, and for His sake God forgives us all our sins. To those who believe in Jesus Christ He gives the power to become the children of God and bestows on them the Holy Spirit. May the Lord, who has begun this good work in us, bring it to completion in the day of our Lord Jesus Christ.

Version 2

Almighty God, our Heavenly Father, has had mercy upon us, and has given His Only Son to die for us, and for His sake forgives us all our sins. To them that believe on His Name, He gives power to become the sons of God, and bestows upon them His Holy Spirit. He that believes, and is baptized, shall be saved. Grant this, O Lord, unto us all.
