= Mea culpa =

Latin phrase acknowledging wrongdoing

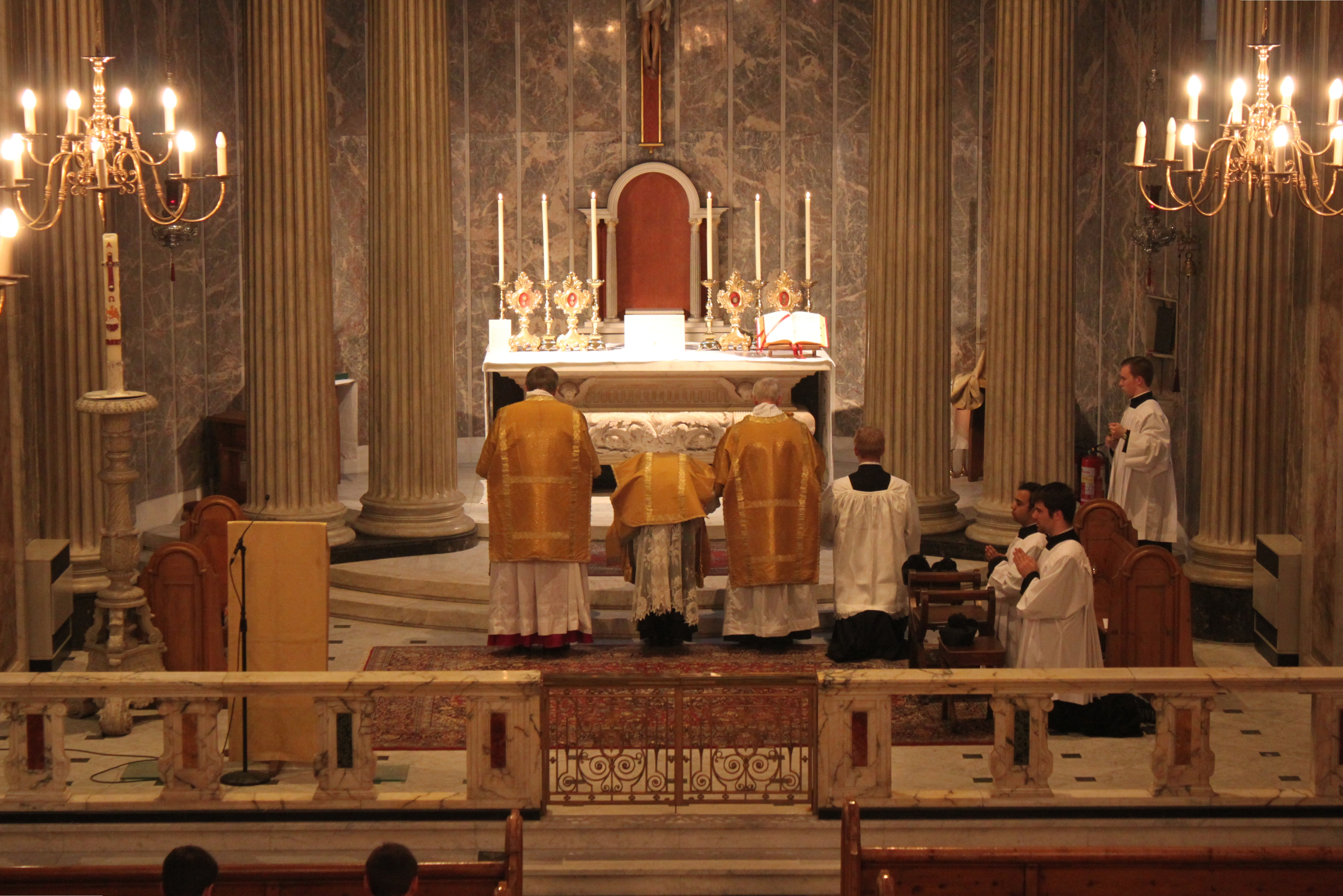
A Confiteor taking place at the Tridentine Mass

Mea culpa (/ˌmeɪ.əˈkʊl.pə/) is a phrase of Latin origin that means my fault or my mistake, and is an acknowledgment of having done wrong. The expression is also used as an admission of having made a mistake that should have been avoided and, in a religious context, may be accompanied by symbolically beating the breast when uttering the words.

The phrase comes from a Western Christian prayer of confession of sinfulness, known as the Confiteor, used in the Roman Rite at the beginning of Mass or when receiving the sacrament of Penance. Grammatically, meā culpā is in the ablative case, with an instrumental meaning.

== Religious use ==
At the sight of the crucifixion of Jesus in the Gospels, "the whole crowd who came together to that sight, seeing what had been done, beat their breasts and returned".

In the present form of the Confiteor as used in the celebration of Mass, mea culpa is said three times, the third time with the addition of the adjective maxima ("very great", usually translated as "most grievous"), and is accompanied by the gesture of beating the breast.

Confíteor Deo omnipoténti
et vobis, fratres,
quia peccávi nimis
cogitatióne, verbo,
ópere et omissióne:
mea culpa, mea culpa,
mea máxima culpa.
Ideo precor beátam Maríam semper vírginem,
omnes angelos et sanctos,
et vos, fratres,
oráre pro me ad Dóminum Deum nostrum.

Translation:

I confess to almighty God
and to you, my brothers [and sisters],
that I have greatly sinned,
in my thoughts and in my words,
in what I have done and in what I have failed to do,
through my fault, through my fault,
through my most grievous fault;
therefore I ask blessed Mary ever-Virgin,
all the Angels and Saints,
and you, my brothers,
to pray for me to the Lord our God.

The Latin phrase mea culpa was used, even in an English context, earlier than that. Geoffrey Chaucer's 14th-century Troilus and Criseyde uses it in a way that shows it was already a traditional religious phrase: "Now, mea culpa, lord! I me repente."

Although the Confiteor was not then part of the Mass, it was used in administering the sacrament of Penance. In some forms it already included the phrase mea culpa. Thus the 9th-century Paenitentiale Vallicellanum II had a thrice-repeated mea culpa (without maxima) in its elaborate form of the Confiteor.

In about 1220, the rite of public penance in Siena for those who had committed murder required the penitent to throw himself on the ground three times, saying: Mea culpa; peccavi; Domine miserere mei ("Through my fault. I have sinned. Lord, have mercy on me").

== See also ==
- List of ecclesiastical abbreviations
- List of Latin phrases
- Self-criticism
