= French Organ Mass =

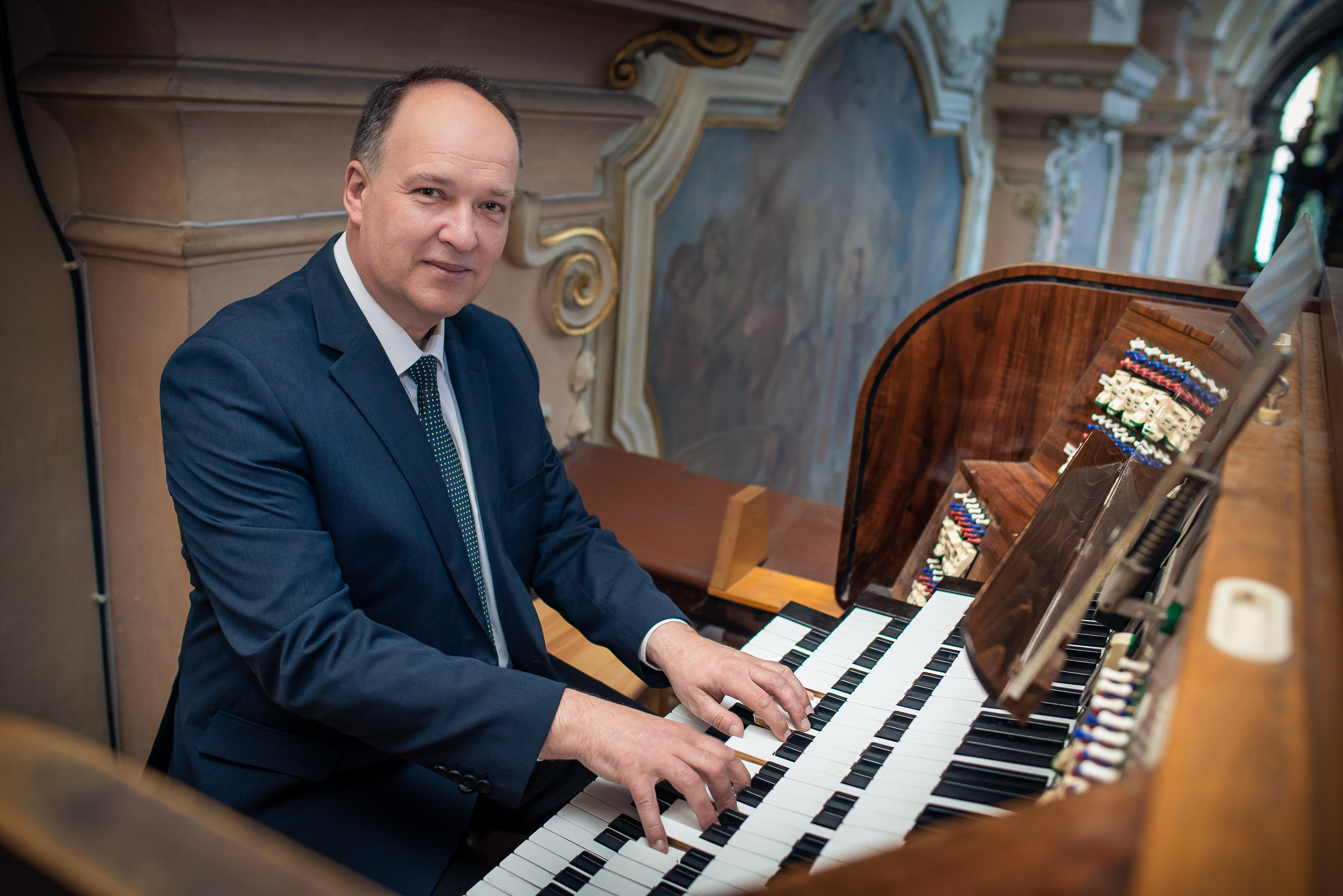
A church organist playing

The French Organ Mass is a type of Low Mass that came into use during the Baroque era. Essentially it is a Low Mass with organ music playing throughout: part of the so-called alternatim practice.

== History ==
The French Organ Mass is a classic example of the so-called alternatim practice, a term which indicates a type of liturgy when alternate sections of liturgical items (such as a Mass or a Magnificat) were performed by different forces. In organ alternatim practice—and so, in the French Organ Mass—the organist plays when texts would otherwise have been sung. The tradition stemmed from the antiphonal psalmody of the early Western church. In France, organ playing was regulated by printed "ceremonials", which specified precisely when the organist should play. The surviving ceremonials are all similar in outline, but differ widely in details. A typical organ Mass comprised versets for the ordinary of the Mass except for the Credo (which was to be sung in its entirety).

One of the most important extant ceremonials was written in 1662 and regulated the diocese of Paris. According to this ceremonial, the organ begins the Kyrie and alternates with the choir through ninefold repetitions (and so ends the Kyrie as well). After the priest intones the first line of the Gloria, the organ again begins the alternation with the choir. After the final verse of the Gloria (which began at "in gloria Dei Patris") the organist would accompany the Offertory: this time there is no alternation and the music does not replace the chant as earlier (while there are texts for the Offertory, they are not for the choir). After the Offertory comes the Sanctus, followed by the Elevation, a high point in the liturgy. The Sanctus begins with an organ verse and proceeds in any of the following three ways:

- the Benedictus is substituted with an organ verset, and then a second organ solo accompanies the Elevation
- the Benedictus is sung, and then the organist accompanies the Elevation
- a single organ verset covers both the Benedictus (instead of the singing) and the following Elevation

This is followed by the Agnus Dei, which consists of three parts. The organ begins this part of the liturgy and alternates with the choir. At the Holy Communion the music either accompanies the distribution of the elements or at the antiphon played just before that. At the end of the Mass the priest sang the last words, "ite missa est", and the organist performed the response, "Deo gratias." A Psalm verse follows, and sometimes after it there is a "sortie", a procession.

Altogether, an average Mass would comprise about 20 versets. Church contracts that survive from that time show that the organist played not only at every Mass, but also during various other offices and ceremonies. An organist may have been required to play at as many as 400 services a year, which means that much—if not all—of the music was improvised, and the surviving masses can be regarded as models for such improvisations. Musically, the majority of the organ Masses were modelled after the Missa cunctipotens genitor (Mass IV in the modern collection), which contained chant melodies. However, composers differed on how they treated these melodies in their works. The 1662 ceremonial specified that the original melodies had to be clearly audible in certain versets, and in cases when Missa cunctipotens was used, organists generally complied.

== Composers ==
The following is a list of composers of French organ masses, arranged chronologically by date of publication of their masses.

- Guillaume-Gabriel Nivers (1632–1714)
  - a mass in Second livre d'orgue (1667)
- Nicolas Lebègue (1631–1702)
  - a mass in Second livre d'orgue (1678)
- Nicolas Gigault (c. 1627–1707)
  - three masses in Livre de musique pour l'orgue (1685)
- André Raison (1640s–1719)
  - five masses in Premier livre d'orgue (1688)
- François Couperin (1668–1733)
  - Messe à l'usage ordinaire des paroisses (1689–90)
  - Messe propre pour les couvents de religieux et religieuses (1689–90)
- Nicolas de Grigny (1672–1703)
  - La Messe in Premier livre d'orgue (1699)
- Gaspard Corrette (1670–c. 1733)
  - Messe du 8e Ton pour l'Orgue à l'Usage des Dames Religieuses (1703)
- Michel Corrette (1707–1795)
  - masses of the Troisième livre d'orgue (1756)
- Monsieur Le Clerc (fl. 1765-1783)
  - 4 masses in the Journal de pièces d'orgue formant huit Magnificat et quatre messes (1780)
- Josse-François-Joseph Benaut (1743–1794)
  - at least 10 masses in numerous Livres des pièces d'orgue

Additionally, an anonymous manuscript (Paris Conservatoire Rés.746, formerly 24827) created around 1680 contains an organ mass by an unknown composer. The manuscript was attributed by Amédée Gastoué to a member of the Geoffroy family, probably Jean-Nicolas Geoffroy, however, according to later research, there is no evidence for such attribution.

== See also ==
- Deutsche Singmesse
