= Confiteor =

Confessional prayer in the Roman Catholic, Lutheran, and Anglican churches

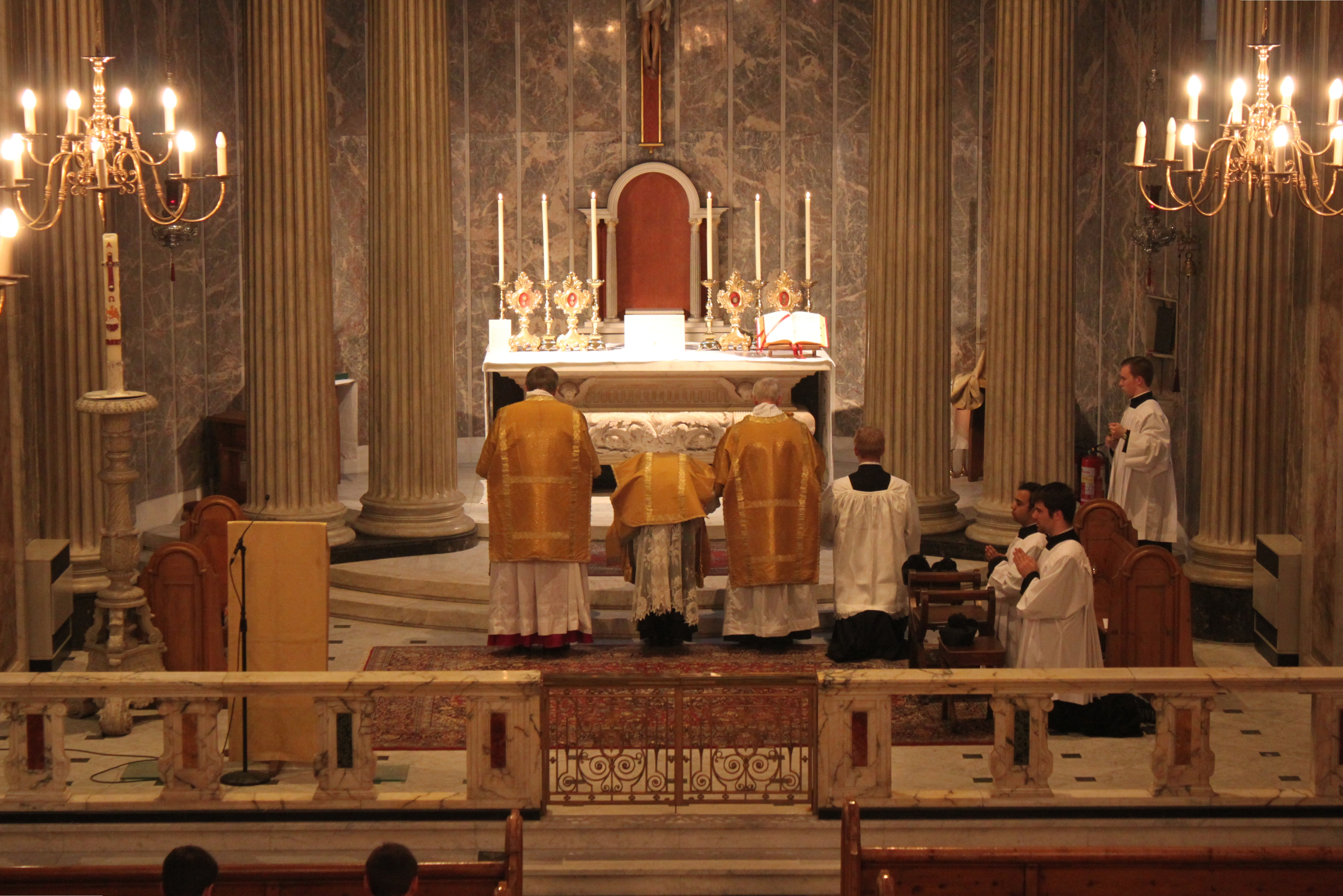
Confiteor said by a priest bowed during a Solemn Mass

The Confiteor (pronounced [konˈfite.or]; so named from its first word, Latin for 'I confess' or 'I acknowledge') is one of the prayers that can be said during the Penitential Act at the beginning of Mass of the Roman Rite in the Catholic Church. It is also said in the Lutheran Church at the beginning of the Divine Service, and by some Anglo-Catholic Anglicans before Mass.

== History ==
While Eastern liturgies begin with a confession of sin made by the celebrant alone, the earliest records of the Roman Rite all describe the Mass as beginning with the introit. However, the celebrant may have used a Confiteor-like confession of sinfulness as one of the private prayers he said in the sacristy before he began Mass. Only in the 10th or 11th century is there any evidence of the preparation for Mass being made at the altar.

Some prayers similar to the Confiteor appear earlier outside Mass. The Canonical Rule of Chrodegang of Metz (d. 743) recommends: "First of all prostrate yourself humbly in the sight of God ... and pray Blessed Mary with the holy Apostles and Martyrs and Confessors to pray to the Lord for you." Ecgbert of York (d. 766) also gives a short form that is the germ of the present prayer: "Say to him to whom you wish to confess your sins: through my fault that I have sinned exceedingly in thought, word, and deed." In answer the confessor says almost exactly the Misereatur.

The Confiteor is first found quoted as part of the introduction of the Mass in Bernold of Constance (died 1100). The Misereatur and Indulgentiam prayers follow, the former slightly different but the latter exactly as in the Tridentine Missal. The Tridentine form of the Confiteor is found in the 14th-century "Ordo Romanus XIV" with only a slight modification, and is found word for word in a decree of the Third Council of Ravenna (1314).

In the Middle Ages, the form of the Confiteor and especially the list of the saints whom it invoked varied considerably. The Carthusian, Carmelite, and Dominican Orders, whose Missals, having by then existed for more than 200 years, were still allowed after 1570, had forms of the Confiteor different from that in the Tridentine Missal. These three forms were quite short, and contained only one "mea culpa"; the Dominicans invoked, besides the Blessed Virgin, Saint Dominic. Moreover, some other orders had the privilege of adding the name of their founder after that of St. Paul. The Franciscans for instance inserted the name of St. Francis of Assisi, and many Benedictine houses added the name of their founder, St. Benedict. The local patron was inserted at the same place in a few local uses.

To what is here taken from the Catholic Encyclopedia one can add the text of an elaborate (but ungrammatical) form of the Confiteor found in the Paenitentiale Vallicellanum II, which has been attributed to the 9th century:

Confiteor Deo et beatae Mariae semper virgini,
et beato Michaeli archangelo et beato Iohanni baptistae
et sanctis apostolis Petro et Paulo omnibus sanctis et tibi patri
mea culpa (III vic.) peccavi
per superbiam in multa mea mala iniqua et pessima cogitatione,
locutione, pollutione, sugestione, delectatione, consensu, verbo et opere,
in periurio, in adulterio, in sacrilegio, omicidio, furtu, falso testimonio,
peccavi visu, auditu, gustu, odoratu et tactu,
et moribus, vitiis meis malis.
Precor beatam Mariam semper virginem et omnibus sanctis
et isti sancti et te pater,
orare et intercedere pro me peccatore Dominum nostrum Ies. Christum.

I confess to God and to blessed Mary ever-Virgin,
to blessed Michael the Archangel and blessed John the Baptist
and to the holy apostles Peter and Paul
along with all the saints and you Father:
through my fault (thrice) I have sinned
by pride in my abundant evil iniquitous and heinous thought,
speech, pollution, suggestion, delectation, consent, word and deed,
in perjury, adultery, sacrilege, murder, theft, false witness,
I have sinned by sight, hearing, taste, smell and touch,
and in my behaviour, my evil vices.
I beg blessed Mary ever-Virgin and all the saints
and these saints (Note: The saints before whose relics confession is made) and you, Father,
to pray and intercede for me a sinner to our Lord Jesus Christ.

In all editions of the Tridentine Roman Missal from 1570 to 1962 the text of the Confiteor remained unvaried, but there were changes in the related rubrics and in the wording of the Misereatur prayer with which the servers responded to the priest's Confiteor and the priest to that of the servers. In the original Tridentine Roman Missal, promulgated and published by Pope St. Pius V in 1570, this prayer included the phrase dimissis omnibus peccatis vestris/tuis ("forgive you all your sins"); but in 1604 another Pope, Clement VIII, revised the original Tridentine Roman Missal of 1570, and, among other changes, removed the word omnibus ("all") from this prayer.

== Usage in Catholicism ==
=== Texts ===
Since 2011, the text of the Confiteor in the Roman Missal is as follows:

Confiteor Deo omnipotenti,
et vobis fratres [et sorores],
quia peccavi nimis
cogitatione, verbo,
opere et omissione:
mea culpa, mea culpa,
mea maxima culpa.
Ideo precor beatam Mariam semper Virginem,
omnes Angelos et Sanctos,
et vos, fratres [et sorores],
orare pro me ad Dominum Deum nostrum.

I confess to almighty God
and to you, my brothers [and sisters],
that I have greatly sinned,
in my thoughts and in my words,
in what I have done and in what I have failed to do,
through my fault, through my fault,
through my most grievous fault;
therefore I ask blessed Mary ever-Virgin,
all the Angels and Saints,
and you, my brothers [and sisters],
to pray for me to the Lord our God.

The form in the Tridentine Roman Missal (in Latin) is longer and is said twice, first by the priest in the following form, then by the altar server(s), who replace the words "et vobis, fratres", "et vos, fratres" (and you, brethren) with "et tibi, pater" and "et te, pater" (and you, Father).

Confiteor Deo omnipotenti,
beatæ Mariæ semper Virgini,
beato Michaeli Archangelo,
beato Ioanni Baptistæ,
sanctis Apostolis Petro et Paulo,
omnibus Sanctis, et vobis, fratres:
quia peccavi nimis
cogitatione, verbo et opere:
mea culpa, mea culpa,
mea maxima culpa.
Ideo precor beatam Mariam semper Virginem,
beatum Michaelem Archangelum,
beatum Ioannem Baptistam,
sanctos Apostolos Petrum et Paulum,
omnes Sanctos, et vos, fratres,
orare pro me ad Dominum Deum nostrum.

I confess to Almighty God,
to blessed Mary ever Virgin,
to blessed Michael the Archangel
to blessed John the Baptist,
to the holy Apostles Peter and Paul,
to all the Saints, and to you, brethren,
that I have sinned exceedingly
in thought, word and deed:
through my fault, through my fault,
through my most grievous fault.
Therefore I beseech blessed Mary ever Virgin,
blessed Michael the Archangel,
blessed John the Baptist,
the holy Apostles Peter and Paul,
all the Saints, and you, brethren,
to pray for me to the Lord our God.

In the Tridentine editions of the Roman Missal, if a priest celebrated Mass in the presence of the Pope or a cardinal, or of a nuncio, a patriarch, a metropolitan archbishop or a diocesan bishop within their own jurisdictions, he changed "et vobis, fratres", "et vos, fratres" (and you, brethren) into "et tibi, pater" and "et te, pater" (and you, Father) when reciting his own Confiteor.

=== Occasions of recitation ===
Until 1969, therefore, the Confiteor was spoken (not sung) twice at the beginning of Mass, after the recitation of Psalm 42/43 (?), once by the priest and once by the server(s) or by the deacon and subdeacon. It was also said, once only (not by the priest), before Communion was distributed to the faithful, until Pope John XXIII in his 1960 Code of Rubrics had it omitted when Communion was distributed within Mass. As the pre-1962 editions of the Tridentine Missal did not envisage any distribution of Communion to the faithful within Mass, it was the rite of giving Communion to the faithful outside of Mass that was used even within Mass.

The Tridentine Roman Ritual also required recitation of the Confiteor before administration of Extreme Unction and the imparting of the Apostolic Blessing to a dying person. The Ritual's prescription that a penitent should begin their confession by reciting at least the opening words of the Confiteor was not generally observed.

The Cæremoniale Episcoporum of the time also laid down that, when a bishop sings high Mass, the deacon should sing the Confiteor after the sermon and before the bishop granted an indulgence. This custom, the only occasion on which the Confiteor was to be sung rather than recited, had fallen into disuse even before the twentieth century.

In the Divine Office, the Confiteor was often said at Prime and almost always at Compline.

Since 1969, the Roman Ritual, the Cæremoniale Episcoporum, and the Liturgy of the Hours no longer require recitation of this particular prayer.

As stated above, Pope John XXIII's 1960 Code of Rubrics and his 1962 edition of the Tridentine Roman Missal, use of which was authorized under the conditions indicated in the 2007 motu proprio Summorum Pontificum, and restricted under the conditions of 2021 motu proprio Traditionis Custodes, removed the recitation of the Confiteor immediately before the distribution of Holy Communion to the people. Nonetheless, in some places where the 1962 Roman Missal is used, this additional Confiteor is in fact recited. A 2011 survey showed that this practice, though controversial, is quite common. Especially in the United States, traditionalist Catholics argue that it should be restored.

=== Accompanying gestures and prayers ===
Tridentine editions of the Roman Missal prescribed that the priest should make a profound bow to the altar while reciting the Confiteor with joined hands and that he should remain bowed until the server or servers began their recitation of the Confiteor.

From 1604 to 1962, the Roman Missal also prescribed that, at the words mea culpa, mea culpa, mea maxima culpa, those reciting the Confiteor should strike their breast three times. Neither the original (1570) Tridentine edition of the Roman Missal nor the Vatican II editions (from 1970 on) specify the number of times. No edition specifies the form of the breast-beating, except to say that it is to be done with the right hand. Some state that the hand should be clenched into a fist while others deny the practice. Saint Augustine of Hippo said: "No sooner have you heard the word 'Confiteor', than you strike your breast. What does this mean except that you wish to bring to light what is concealed in the breast, and by this act to cleanse your hidden sins?" (Sermo de verbis Domini, 13), and Saint Jerome said: "We strike our breast, because the breast is the seat of evil thoughts: we wish to dispel these thoughts, we wish to purify our hearts" (In Ezechiel, xviii). This gesture of sorrow for sin is found in Scripture, as for instance in Luke 18:13 and Jeremiah 31:19.

Tridentine editions prescribed that a prayer be said for the person who recited the Confiteor. After the priest's recitation, the server(s) prayed: "Misereátur tui omnípotens Deus, et dimíssis peccátis tuis, perdúcat te ad vitam ætérnam" (May Almighty God have mercy upon you and, your sins having been forgiven, may He bring you to eternal life). And the priest responded: "Amen". After the recitation by the server(s), the priest said the same prayer (with vestri and vestris, "you" plural, not "you" singular), and the server(s) answers: "Amen". In editions since 1970, in which the Confiteor is recited jointly, this prayer is said by the priest alone, replacing vestri and vestris ("you" and "your") with nostri and nostris ("us" and "our"). The official English translation is: "May almighty God have mercy on us, forgive us our sins, and bring us to everlasting life."

This prayer is referred to as the "absolution", a prayer for forgiveness, not a granting of forgiveness as in the Sacrament of Penance. It is therefore classified as a sacramental, not a sacrament.

Tridentine editions of the Roman Missal included a second prayer of absolution, said by the priest alone: "Indulgéntiam, absolutiónem, et remissiónem peccatórum nostrórum tríbuat nobis omnípotens et miséricors Dóminus" (May the Almighty and merciful God grant us pardon, absolution, and remission of our sins). The server(s) or deacon and subdeacon responded to this also with "Amen".

=== Indulgence ===
The 2004 Enchiridion Indulgentiarum granted a partial indulgence to those who pray the Confiteor in preparation for the Sacrament of Penance.

== Usage in Lutheranism ==
It is Lutheran tradition for the Confiteor to be recited by the congregation at the beginning of each Divine Service. The following is a common text, similar to the 2010 ICEL translation:

Most merciful God, we confess that we are by nature sinful and unclean. We have sinned against you in thought, word, and deed, by what we have done and by what we have left undone. We have not loved You with our whole heart; we have not loved our neighbors as ourselves. We justly deserve Your present and eternal punishment. For the sake of Your Son, Jesus Christ, have mercy on us. Forgive us, renew us, and lead us, so that we may delight in Your will and walk in Your ways to the glory of your Holy Name. Amen.

The Confiteor is also said during the office of Compline, the final office/liturgy of the day. In the Lutheran Service Book, used by the Lutheran Church – Missouri Synod, it is first recited by the pastor, then repeated by the congregation. The Compline Confiteor is as follows:

I confess to God Almighty, before the whole company of heaven and to you, my brothers and sisters, that I have sinned in thought, word, and deed by my fault, by my own fault, by my own most grievous fault; wherefore I pray God Almighty to have mercy on me, forgive me all my sins, and bring me to everlasting life. Amen.

== See also ==
- Penitential Rite
- Mea culpa
