= Low Mass =

Type of Mass

Low Mass (Latin Missa Privata) is a Mass celebrated by a priest without the assistance of sacred ministers (deacon and subdeacon). Before the 1969 reforms, a sub-distinction was also made between the sung Mass (Missa in cantu), when the celebrant still chants those parts which the rubrics require to be chanted, and the low Mass (Missa lecta) where the liturgy is spoken.

In a low Mass, the priest may be assisted by altar boys (acolytes) rather than deacons, and use appropriately simplified rubrics.

A full sung Mass celebrated with the assistance of sacred ministers is a High or Solemn Mass.

The celebration of Low Mass in the Roman Rite decreased with the 1969 reforms in the Catholic Church, but continues in Lutheranism and parts of Anglicanism.

== History ==
Low Mass originated in the early Middle Ages as a shortened or simplified form of Solemn Mass. In the early church, as in the Eastern Orthodox church today, all services were chanted, and there was no equivalent to the Roman Low Mass or to the Anglican "said celebration".

=== Masses without solemnity in early Christianity ===
Alongside the public solemn Masses, the practice developed from the 4th century onwards, of smaller private Masses for smaller groups of believers. These masses were often celebrated in the catacombs, for the deceased or on a special anniversary. An example is provided by Saint Augustine:

Hesperius, of a tribunitian family, ... finding that his family, his cattle, and his servants were suffering from the malice of evil spirits, he asked our presbyters, during my absence, that one of them would go with him and banish the spirits by his prayers. One went, offered there the sacrifice of the body of Christ, praying with all his might that that vexation might cease. It did cease immediately, through God's mercy.

— Saint Augustine of Hippo, The City of God, Book 22, chapter 8, n. 6.

=== Medieval origins of the Low Mass ===
Christian practice had been that there was, at most, one Mass in a monastery or parish church each day. At Cluny in the 11th century a lay-brother (conversus) was summoned to serve any priest-monk who wanted to celebrate; rules and obligations, as the reading of a Sequence, during the celebration of the private Masses gradually fell, for reasons of convenience. This history of liturgy shows how "out of the private Mass grew the read Mass – the low Mass".

In the late Middle Ages, with a growing awareness of the infinite value of the Mass, came a growing desire to multiply its celebration. Spiritual, as well as material reasons were at hand. The most pronounced result of the multiplying of Masses was the increase in low Masses, since most of them were for private requests and had no public character. This trend to the private and the subjective, to an independence from the grand order of things was also displayed in another abuse, namely, setting aside the arrangement of the ecclesiastical year and confining oneself to Votive Masses either chosen at will or arranged according to the rules of the Mass series. Over time it became necessary for a variety of reasons to celebrate more than one on the same day. It also became customary for monasteries to ordain most of their monks, though originally monks were almost all laymen, and for every priest to say a daily Mass. For a while, concelebration, whereby several priests took a full priestly part in offering Mass, provided all with the possibility to celebrate Mass each day, but this custom died out. Low Mass is considered to be a necessity that falls short of the ideal, which is Solemn Mass.

The Catholic Encyclopedia of 1913 describes the result as follows:

[…] concelebration was in the early Middle Ages replaced by separate private celebrations. No doubt the custom of offering each Mass for a special intention helped to bring about this change. The separate celebrations then involved the building of many altars in one church and the reduction of the ritual to the simplest possible form. The deacon and subdeacon were in this case dispensed with; the celebrant took their part as well as his own. One server took the part of the choir and of all the other ministers, everything was said instead of being sung, the incense and kiss of peace were omitted. So we have the well-known rite of low Mass (missa privata). This then reacted on high Mass (missa solemnis), so that at high Mass too the celebrant himself recites everything, even though it be also sung by the deacon, subdeacon, or choir.

By the end of the Middle Ages, critics had grown more numerous, and mystics, such as Nicholas of Cusa, or bishops, attempted a spiritual and disciplinary reform, to avoid scandals of botched Masses and abuse of stipends. A special work of Martin Luther's deals with "the abomination of the low Mass called the canon" (Von dem Greuel der Stillmesse so man Canon nennet, 1524). His criticisms were such that priests, who had been living on Mass stipends, could no longer do so as easily, even in staunchly Catholic areas as the Archbishopric of Salzburg.

=== Tridentine Reform ===
The Council of Trent was concerned above all with the "Low Mass" (that is, with a liturgy that was recited and not sung), which had become the ordinary form of the Eucharistic celebration in the parishes. The Roman Missal revised after the Council of Trent appears as a work that defines, above all, the rituals of "Low Mass" or the "private Mass". Some have argued that in giving priority to the "Low Mass", a practice developed of making the Eucharistic celebration an act of private devotion by the priest, whereas the faithful were simply invited to attend the Mass and to unite their prayers with it as sincerely as possible as a certain individualism developed alongside the devotio moderna.

Those who during the Counter-Reformation attempted to rebuild religious life had to look for different ways and means to enable the faithful to participate in a devout manner. One of the ways was to encourage vocal prayer during Mass, to meditate on the mysteries of the life of Christ by praying the Rosary, a practise which had existed locally since the Middle Ages, but which become popular under the influence of the popular missions organized by the Jesuits. The German Singmesse, which added sung hymns to the Low Mass, gradually won great popularity, to the place that it began to take over the Solemn Mass.

By the mid-20th century, a new form of the Low Mass, the missa dialogata, appeared as a new mode of encouraging the participation of the faithful. In the Low Mass, the alternation of functions between priest, lector, singing choir and people had been leveled off to a uniform speaking by the priest alone. However, the Low Mass had acquired such a great preponderance over the various forms of high Mass that without further ado it was used as the groundwork for the development of the dialogue Mass. In essentials nevertheless, the High Mass had to set the norm. Various local churches went in various directions and the so-called Betsingmesse ("pray and sing mass") very quickly gained recognition since its first trial use at the Vienna Catholic Day in 1933. No changes affected the Missale Romanum, neither its texts nor its rubrics, as the changes concerned the participation of the faithful solely.

The Tridentine Mass defined officially in the Code of Rubrics included in the 1962 edition of the Roman Missal is a Mass in which the priest does not chant the parts that the rubrics assign to him.

=== Modern ===
Catholic writer Stratford Caldecott has suggested that the Low Mass is so influential it may now be considered the real model of the post-Vatican II Mass.

In 2007 Pope Benedict XVI introduced an optional novelty into the traditional Low Mass: in Masses with a congregation celebrated according to the 1962 Missal, the vernacular language, and not Latin alone, may be used in proclaiming the Scripture readings, provided that the translation used comes from an edition approved by the Holy See.

== "Private Mass" ==
"Private Mass" (in Latin, Missa privata or secreta, familiaris, peculiaris), which is now understood as Mass celebrated without a congregation (sine populo), formerly meant any Low Mass, even with a large congregation. In editions of the Roman Missal earlier than that of 1962, "Missa privata" was still contrasted with "Missa solemnis". In 1960 Pope John XXIII, who in 1962 removed from the Roman Missal the section headed Rubricae generales Missalis, replacing it with his Code of Rubrics, decried use of the term "Missa privata": "The most sacred Sacrifice of the Mass celebrated according to the rites and regulations is an act of public worship offered to God in the name of Christ and the Church. Therefore, the term 'private Mass' should be avoided." When applied to Low Mass in general, the word privata indicated that that form of Mass was deprived of certain ceremonies.

== Structure of the Low Mass ==
The Eucharistic celebration is "one single act of worship" but consists of different elements, which always include "the proclamation of the Word of God; thanksgiving to God the Father for all his benefits, above all the gift of his Son; the consecration of bread and wine, which signifies also our own transformation into the body of Christ; and participation in the liturgical banquet by receiving the Lord's body and blood".

Low Mass, celebrated in exactly the same way whether a congregation is present or not, was the most common form of Mass before 1969. In the 1970 edition of the Roman Missal a distinction was made between Mass celebrated with a congregation and Mass celebrated without a congregation. No such distinction was made in earlier (Tridentine) editions of the Roman Missal, which only distinguished between Solemn Mass and Low Mass (calling the latter Missa lecta or, as in the Rubricae generales Missalis included in pre-1962 editions, Missa privata).

The structure of the Tridentine Low Mass was generally the same as that of the Solemn High Mass. However, prayers after Mass, including the Leonine prayers, were added. The main celebrant is not assisted by a deacon nor subdeacon, nor is he answered by a choir, but one or two altar servers follow their duties as acolytes, and answer the responses in Latin. All prayers are recited and no singing is expected. The incensement rite is not included. The faithful were expected to kneel for most of the Mass, except for the proclamation of the Gospel.

== Variations ==
=== National variations ===
Originally, Low Mass was sung in monotone. Thus we read of priests in the Middle Ages going to sing their "Missa privata" or "Low Mass". This custom of singing died out in the 18th century. Much of the Tridentine Low Mass is said in a voice audible only to the celebrating priest and the server(s).

The French and Germans evolved the concept of accompanying Low Mass with music as an aid to the devotion of the faithful, thus giving rise to the French Organ Mass and the Deutsche Singmesse. Also Messe basse, the French translation of Low Mass, was used to indicate Mass compositions, e.g. Fauré's Messe basse.

In 1922, the Holy See granted approval to the Dialogue Mass, which enabled the faithful to speak, with the server, the Latin responses of the Tridentine Mass and to recite the parts that they were permitted to sing at a Missa Cantata, as well as the triple "Domine non sum dignus" that the priest said as part of the rite of Communion of the faithful, which, though not envisaged in the Ordinary of the Mass until after the Second Vatican Council, could be inserted into the celebration of Mass.

=== The three Masses of All Souls Day ===
All Souls Day is the only non-Sunday, non-Holy Day in the Church Year on which a priest is permitted to celebrate three Masses. The Tridentine Missal contains three distinct sets of Mass Propers to be celebrated, should a priest be able to celebrate all three Masses. Note that no matter how many Masses are celebrated, the faithful may receive Holy Communion at no more than two Masses per day.

=== Pontifical Low Mass ===
At a Pontifical Low Mass, i.e. a Low Mass celebrated by a bishop, in addition to the two servers that you find at any typical low Mass, there are also two priest-attendants to the bishop that assist him, reminding us that a bishop retains the fullness of holy orders. Instead of a mitre, a biretta is used by the prelate.

Before the Second Vatican Council, at a Papal Low Mass (which was usually celebrated at a portable altar set up in one of the rooms of the Apostolic Palace and is distinct from the private Mass the Pope said in his private chapel), the Pope was assisted by two bishops and four papal Masters of Ceremonies. Chamberlains (cubicularii) served as torchbearers. The pontifical canon was used, as was the bugia. Vesting and unvesting at the altar is another peculiarity of Pontifical Low Mass.

== In popular culture ==
The Three Low Masses (Les Trois Messes basses) is a Christmas story by Alphonse Daudet, published in 1875 in the Tales of Monday and integrated in 1879 in the collection of the Letters from my Windmill. The story is at the end of the eighteenth century, in an imaginary Provençal castle. Pleasant and irreverent, tinged with fantasy, it depicts a priest guilty of the sin of gluttony. Tempted by the devil who, in the guise of his young sexton, has described to him in great detail the exquisite menu of New Year's Eve, he sends off three Christmas Masses to rush more quickly to the table. God punishes his offense: before going to heaven, he will have to recite, for a century, in the company of his faithful culprits, a service of the Nativity, or three hundred low masses.

However, the Christmas Low Masses are a goof as the rubrics extended the privilege of three sung Masses from the Pope to all the clergy, and in no case applied to the Low Mass. The three stational Masses celebrated by the Pope in Rome extended to three Christmas Masses to be sung, not without interruption: that of the day, solemnissima,; that of the night, valde solemnis,; that of daybreak, minus solemnis and resulted of a duplicate of the feast of the Epiphanies in Jerusalem. The privilege of celebrating at night did not extend, except indult, to private Masses, i.e. low Masses; the contrary custom was an abuse and was condoned.

A French-language film with the same title was made in 1954 by Marcel Pagnol.
