= Solemn Mass =

Full ceremonial form of the Tridentine Mass

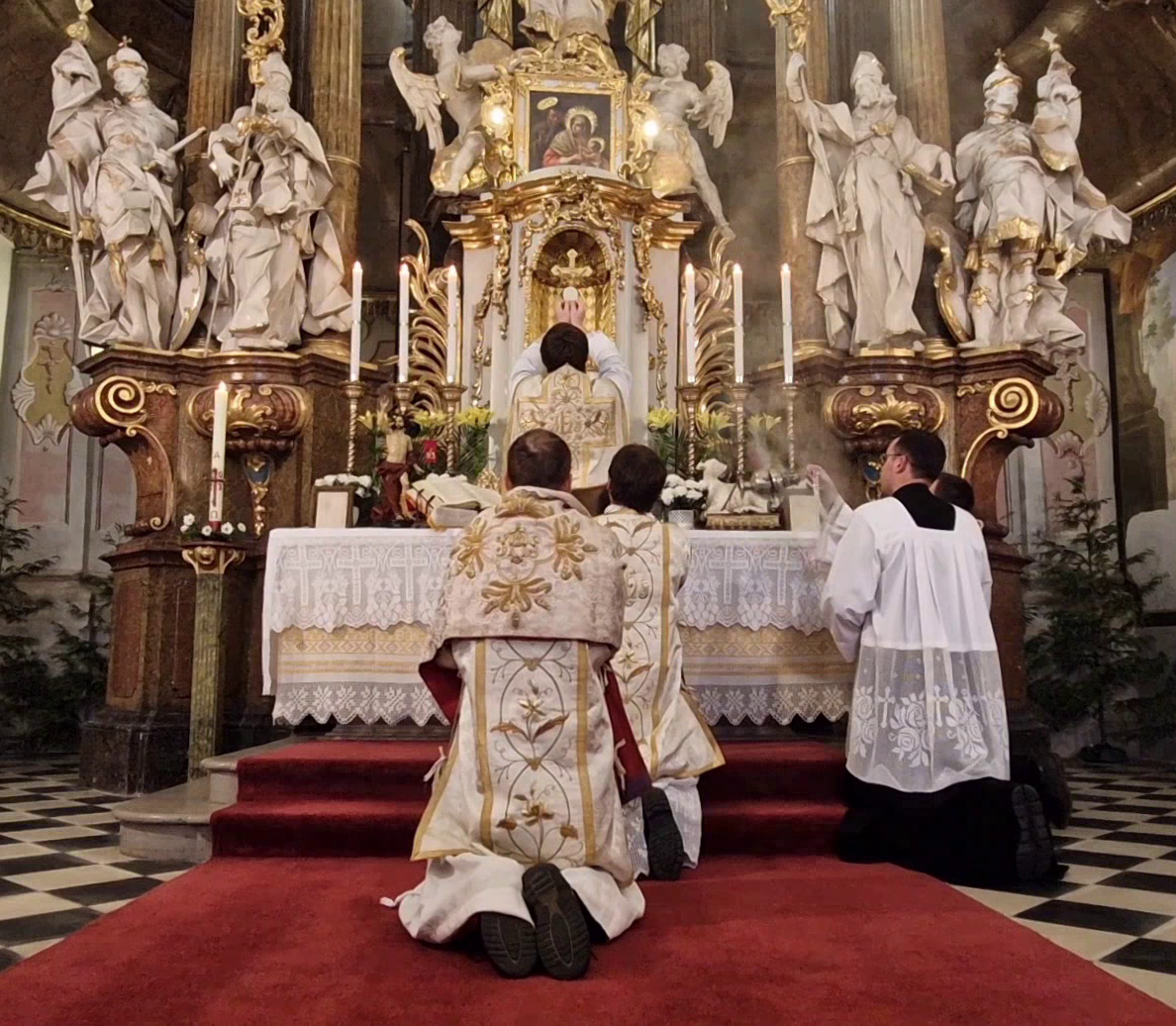
Elevation at a Solemn Tridentine Mass in Prostějov, Czech Republic

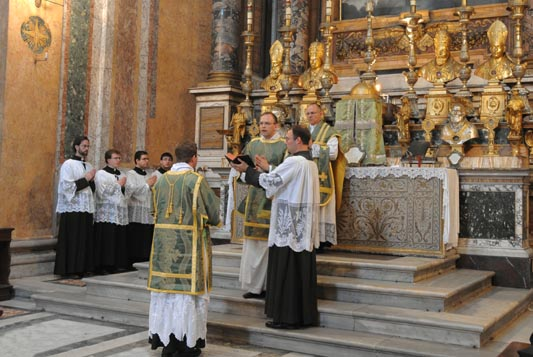
Ite missa est sung by the deacon at a Solemn Mass at Santissima Trinità dei Pellegrini, Rome

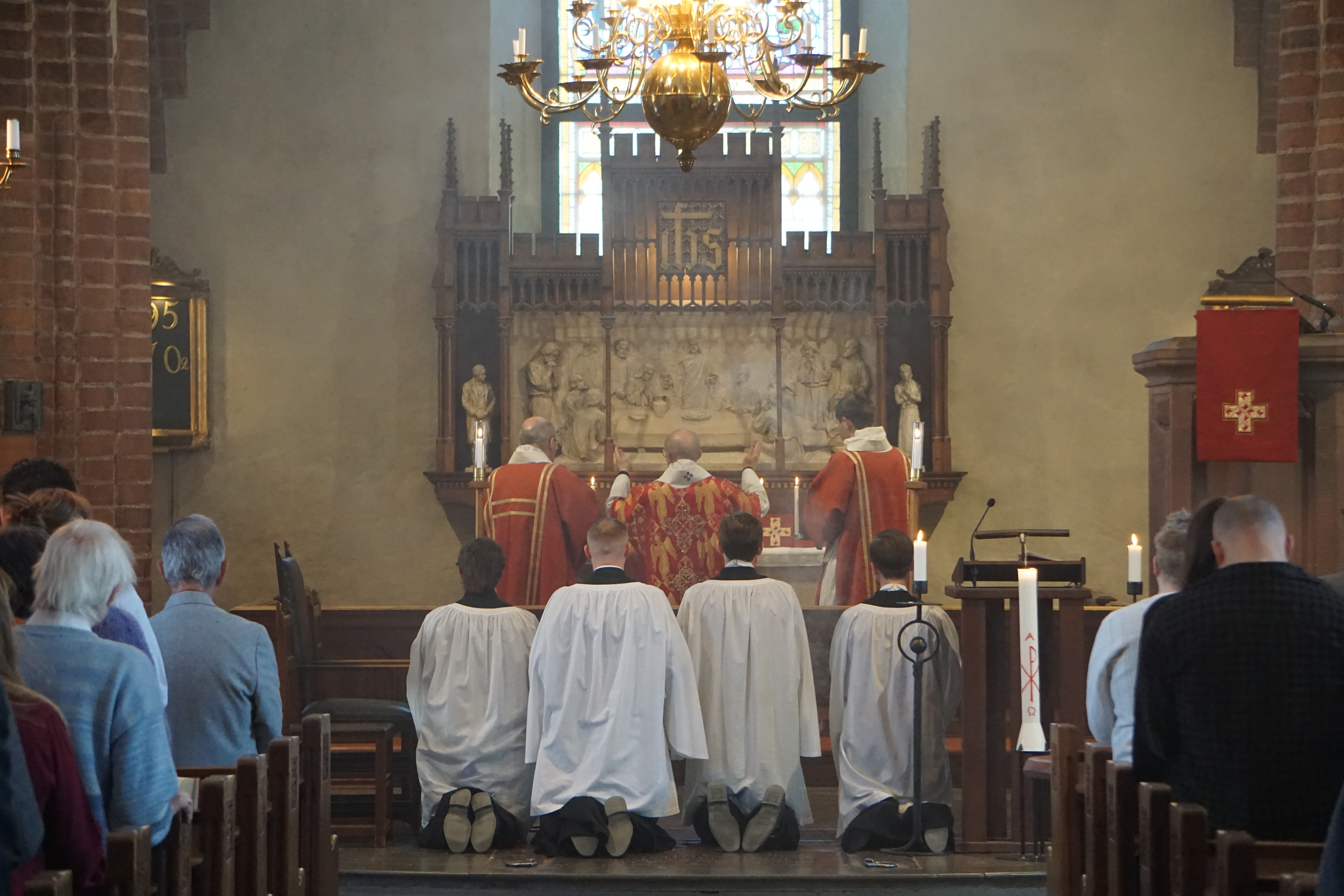
Evangelical-Lutheran priests celebrate High Mass at Holy Trinity Church in Uppsala on the Feast Day of the Apostles Philip and James the Less.

Solemn Mass (Latin: missa solemnis) is the full ceremonial form of a Mass, predominantly associated with the Tridentine Mass where it is celebrated by a priest with a deacon and a subdeacon, requiring most of the parts of the Mass to be sung, and may include the use of incense. It is also called High Mass or Solemn High Mass.

These terms distinguish it from a Low Mass and Missa cantata. The parts assigned to the deacon and subdeacon are often performed by priests in vestments proper to those roles. A Solemn Mass celebrated by a bishop has its own particular ceremonies and is referred to as a Solemn Pontifical Mass. Within the Roman Rite, the history of the Solemn Mass has been traced to the 7th century in the Gregorian Sacramentary and Ordo Romanus Primus, followed by several centuries of adapting these pontifical liturgies. Eventually, the proliferation of multiple parish churches within the same cities saw these liturgies further adapted so that the average priest could celebrate them. By the 13th century, those Masses with ceremonial more closely following that of the pontifical liturgies were identified as "Solemn" or "High Masses" in contrast with simpler "Low Masses". In the Catholic Church, since the promulgation of the 1969 Roman Missal, much of the Solemn Mass's ceremonial has fallen into obsolescence and disuse.

In Lutheranism and parts of Anglicanism, High Mass is celebrated in a manner similar to the Tridentine Rite.

== Definition ==
Solemn or High Mass is the full form of Mass and elements of the abbreviated forms can be explained only in its light:

This high Mass is the norm; it is only in the complete rite with deacon and subdeacon that the ceremonies can be understood. Thus, the rubrics of the Ordinary of the Mass always suppose that the Mass is high. Low Mass, said by a priest alone with one server, is a shortened and simplified form of the same thing. Its ritual can be explained only by a reference to high Mass. For instance, the celebrant goes over to the north side of the altar to read the Gospel, because that is the side to which the deacon goes in procession at high Mass; he turns round always by the right, because at high Mass he should not turn his back to the deacon and so on.

Thus, in the 21st century, the term "solemn Mass", capitalized or not, is also increasingly used instead of an analogous celebration in the post-Vatican II form of the Roman Rite of Mass, in which case it has been defined as "a high Mass in which the priest is assisted by two deacons". The functions that the two deacons carry out are indicated in the General Instruction of the Roman Missal and the 1989 edition of the Ceremonial of Bishops,

In the Syro-Malabar Church, this Holy Qurbana divine liturgy has three forms: a simplified form, a standard form for Sundays use, and a Solemn High form, known as the Raza, used only on solemnities. A reform of the Raza launched in November 1931 in order to return to the unadulterated and original form was issued in 1985, followed in 1989 by a reform of the other two forms carried out with the same principles.

The terms "Solemn Mass", "Solemn High Mass" and "High Mass" are also often used within Anglo-Catholicism, in which the ceremonial, and sometimes the text, are based on those of the Sarum Rite or the later Tridentine Mass. Lutherans (mainly in Europe) sometimes use the term "High Mass" to describe a more solemn form of their Divine Service, generally celebrated in a manner similar to that of Roman Catholics. Examples of similarities include vestments, chanting, and incense. Lutheran congregations in North America commonly celebrate High Mass more or less, but rarely use the term "Mass".

== History: from the Pontifical Mass to the Missa Solemnis ==
=== Adaptation of Roman papal liturgy in Frankish monasteries in the first millennium ===
The primitive and original form of Mass celebration is that in which the bishop surrounded by his clergy offers up the sacrifice in the presence of the congregation. The direct descendant of the bishops' collective service is the pontifical service, especially in its most elaborate form, the papal Mass. According to Jungmann, the solemn high Mass is "a late simplification of the pontifical service". Ample proof is to be found in the arrangement for Mass ·as outlined in an eighth century Breviarium ecclesiastici ordinis adapted to the circumstances of a Frankish Scots monastery: in it, nearly everything of ritual splendor has been transferred to the monastic sacerdos: deacons, subdeacons, clerics, seven candles, Pax vobis and double lavabo. If these Frankish sources refer first and foremost to the role of bishops in the liturgy, they are soon allotted to the priests also.

=== Missionary exportation of the High Mass by the Order of Preachers ===
The outlines of the present-day form of the missa solemnis became distinct after the tenth or eleventh century. The Synod of Limoges in 1031 enjoined abbots and other priests not to have more than three deacons on feast-days, while bishops were allowed to have five or seven.

In 1065, Bishop John of Avranches provided testimony of the arrangement of the High Mass in its modern form with only one deacon and one subdeacon:

When the priest reaches the altar after the Confiteor, he kisses deacon and subdeacon. The deacon thereupon kisses the altar at both the narrow sides, hands the priest the Gospel-book to be kissed; then the priest kisses the altar. Several taper-bearers are among the assisting group, on feast-days seven. When the subdeacon begins the Epistle, the priest sits down, but iuxta altare. The subdeacon hands bread and wine to the deacon after the Gospel; the water is brought by a cantor. The incensing follows. Then the subdeacon takes the paten, but turns it over to an acolyte.

The conventual Mass at the Abbey of Cluny at the same time also displays the same type of Mass with deacon and subdeacon.

In general the rite of high Mass has not changed much since the eleventh century, if we except the peculiar usages of certain regions and certain monasteries.

The High Mass was exported out of the monasteries and into the mission territories by the Order of Preachers as exposed in the Missale convetuale of Humbert of Romans published in 1256, the Carmelite order publishing its own similar rite seven years later. Just as the Dominicans simplified the Gregorian chant for their missionary convents, they also exported the High Mass in a slightly simplified ritual. The careful description of the priestly High Mass which is presented in the 1256 Ordinarium of the Dominicans reveals in all essentials the present-day arrangement. The solemn vesting program is dropped, two to four candles are found sufficient, and they stand on the altar. The priest no longer employs the phrase Pax vobis but only Dominus vobiscum, he says the oration, and likewise the Gloria and the Credo, at the altar, and washes his hands only after the incensing. The solemn blessing, as well as the assisting priest (presbyter assistens), substitute for the old colleger of priests, were still in the foreground in the 12th century.

=== Rarification of the High Mass ===
The movement towards the rarification of the Solemn Mass was a slow process through the Middle Ages which worsened after the Renaissance as it retained only for great feast days. While the Capuchins had made their conventual mass a Low Mass, the Jesuits were the first to exclude the Solemn High Mass from their ordinary practise in their second constitution, after the 1550 papal bull, Exposcit debitum, "out of duty". The Society of Jesus not only had no choral Office but also no high Mass, since for the latter the contemporary arrangements usually presupposed the presence of the community to take care of the singing; pastoral activity in the wake of the Counter-Reformation was seen as the reason for this abandonment:

Non utentur nostri choro ad horas canonicas, vel missas, et alia officia decantanda: quandoquidem illis, quos ad ea audienda devotio moverit, abunde suppetet ubi sibi ipsis satisfaciant. Per nostros autem ea tractari convenit, quae nostra vocationi ad Dei gloriam magis sunt consentanea.

— Constitutiones Societatis Iesu, 1550

On the other hand, other movements, such as the French school of spirituality, promoted the High Mass in its parochial form, as a way to introduce the faithful to a more mystical faith. Such was Jean-Jacques Olier who, in 1657, published an explanation of the rites of the High Mass for the parochial use. In this classical period, the Missa solemnis developed as a genre of musical settings for the High Mass, which were festively scored and rendered the Latin text extensively, opposed to the more modest Missa brevis. Its complexity, however, also contributed to make it into a rarity.

By the mid-twentieth century, the missa cantata had, in most dioceses, become the predominant solemn form the Mass of parish service for Sunday services, while the low mass took over the rest of the week. The High Mass came to mean the summum officium of any determined community, reaching a high-point in a solemn Mass with deacon and subdeacon and an introductory procession of the clergy, which was not necessarily even weekly in some parishes. Among the various daily services, the High Mass became a Sunday summum officium distinguished, marking the climax of the morning service and capable of many varying degrees, only rarely reaching a high-point in a solemn Mass with deacon and subdeacon.

=== Liturgical Movement: between antiquarianism and active participation ===
From the 19th century onwards, in the context of the Liturgical Movement, various currents existed with some leaning towards antiquarianism while others favoured active participation within the dialogue Mass.

Pope Pius XII did not think that the Dialogue Mass was an absolute replacement of the High Mass. In his landmark encyclical Mediator Dei, Pius XII explains that High Masses possess their “own special dignity due to the impressive character of its ritual and the magnificence of its ceremonies.” Pius XII encouraged the dialogue Mass and external lay participation but still retains the honor of the High Mass:

A "dialogue" Mass of this kind cannot replace the high Mass, which, as a matter of fact, though it should be offered with only the sacred ministers present, possesses its own special dignity due to the impressive character of its ritual and the magnificence of its ceremonies. The splendor and grandeur of a high Mass, however, are very much increased if, as the Church desires, the people are present in great numbers and with devotion.

— Pius XII, Mediator Dei, 100

One year later, in 1948, the Jesuit priest, Josef Andreas Jungmann, published the most in-depth study of the Solemn Mass, Missarum Sollemnia, showing both its antiquity and its rarity in the parochial structure, arguably proving that the missa cantata was "the unbroken continuation of the presbyter Mass of Christian antiquity.".

=== Vatican II and the High Mass ===
The Second Vatican Council, while calling for a reform of the liturgy, insisted on the solemnity of the sacred rites:

Liturgical worship is given a more noble form when the divine offices are celebrated solemnly in song, with the assistance of sacred ministers and the active participation of the people.

— Constitution on the Sacred Liturgy Sacrosanctum Concilium, 113

Since its 1970 revision, the Roman Missal no longer categorizes Mass as High or Low (in Latin, solemnis or lecta), and distinguishes Mass only as celebrated with a congregation (with a subdivision according as it is celebrated with or without a deacon) or with participation by only one minister, and as celebrated with or without concelebrating priests. It recommends singing at all Masses, saying, for instance: "Although it is not always necessary (e.g., in weekday Masses) to sing all the texts that are of themselves meant to be sung, every care should be taken that singing by the ministers and the people is not absent in celebrations that occur on Sundays and on holy days of obligation"; and: "It is very appropriate that the priest sing those parts of the Eucharistic Prayer for which musical notation is provided." The term "High Mass" is sometimes encountered also, both in Anglican and certain Roman Catholic circles, to describe any Mass celebrated with greater solemnity. While some have argued that simplifying the Solemn High Mass removed barriers between the Protestant and the Catholic liturgies, others have argued that it led to the destruction of traditions held in common by Latin Christians and the Eastern Orthodox.

However, the Solemn High Mass continues to be celebrated around the world, in parishes as well as during Catholic meetings for youth, such as the World Youth Day in Panama in January 2019. However, in Catholic communities which continue to celebrate the Mass according to the pre-Vatican II missals, the Low Mass appears to sometimes attract more faithful than the High Mass. Of the two most recent motu proprio concerning the pre-Vatican II celebration of the Mass, neither Summorum Pontificum nor Traditionis Custodes mention the High Mass.

== Vestments ==
In the sacristy, before vesting, all three sacred ministers (priest celebrant, deacon, and subdeacon) wash their hands. The sacred ministers recite certain prayers while they place on each vestment. First, the amice (a rectangular cloth of white linen with long strings for tying) is kissed (if it is embroidered with a cross) and then placed on top of the head briefly while reciting one of the prayers during vesting. Then it is tied around the shoulders on top of the cassock (or on top of the habit, if the sacred ministers belongs to a religious order with one). Next the alb (a long, white linen tunic with sleeves) is put on. The cincture (in Latin, cinctura), a long cloth cord also called a girdle, is then tied around the waist. The subdeacon then completes his vesting by placing the maniple (an embroidered piece of fabric, folded in half, with a cross in the middle) on his left arm (provided there is no Asperges or other liturgical ceremony before Mass begins), securing it either with pins or with the ribbons or elastic inside, and then the tunicle (an embroidered tunic with short sleeves) over all. The deacon places his stole (a long narrow embroidered piece of cloth, similar to the maniple but of greater length) over his left shoulder and binds it in place, at his right hip, with the cincture or girdle. He then puts on the maniple and his dalmatic (similar to the tunicle). The priest celebrant does the same except that he crosses his stole in front of him at the waist, binding it with the girdle or cincture. After the maniple he puts on a cope (a long, heavy embroidered cape) if the Mass is preceded by the Asperges (sprinkling the congregation with holy water). Following the Asperges, the celebrant, assisted by the acolytes, removes the cope and puts on the chasuble (similar to the tunicle, but without sleeves and usually with an embroidered cross or image on the back). The outer vestments of the priest and deacons correspond to the liturgical color of the season or day (green, purple, white, gold, red, pink or "rose", or black).

The servers of the Mass (Master of Ceremonies, acolytes, thurifer, torch-bearers) and the clergy sitting in the liturgical choir stalls are vested in cassock (the ankle-length black robe with buttons, usually seen on priests and altar servers) and surplice (a flowing white tunic with sleeves) or cotta (a shorter version of the surplice), though in some places acolytes wore simple albs and cinctures instead. Anyone ordained to the subdiaconate or above also wears the biretta (a three-cornered hat with perhaps a pom-pom on top in the center and three fins on top around the edges) while sitting. Members of religious orders in habit have on a surplice over the habit. If it is part of their "choir dress", they also use the biretta. If not, then they use their hood in the same fashion as one uses a biretta. Birettas are plain black for priests, deacons and subdeacons, purple or black with purple or red trim for monsignori, canons, bishops and archbishops; cardinals' birettas are scarlet.

== Music ==
The typical music of Solemn Mass is Gregorian chant. However, a wide variety of musical settings of the Ordinary of the Mass have been composed over the centuries, and may be used instead. The polyphonic works of Giovanni Pierluigi da Palestrina and Giovanni Gabrieli are considered especially suitable. There are also several musical settings for the propers of Masses during seasons and on feast days and for certain votive Masses. An example is William Byrd's setting of the minor propers for the Lady Mass in Advent.

Despite discouragement, more than a century ago, by Pope Pius X in Tra le Sollecitudine (1903) of the selection of post-Renaissance compositions often considered to be "sacred music", musical settings for the Ordinary of the Mass by composers such as Wolfgang Amadeus Mozart continue in use. Being based on texts in Latin, these settings, as well as the earlier ones, are less frequently met today.

The music of the Mass is typically performed by a choir. The Ordinary is theoretically designated for the whole congregation, whereas the Propers are proper to the choir of clerics in attendance. In practice, even the Ordinary is often too complicated for the congregation, and the choir is often made up of specially trained lay men and women (though in churches run by religious orders it is often made up of their members.) The choir, at least if clerical, was traditionally placed close to the altar in stalls. However, with the appearance of elaborate musical settings of the Ordinary of the Mass it became necessary to employ lay singers, and with this innovation, the choir moved first from the front of the church up to galleries on the sides of the church and then finally to a loft in the back. This in turn allowed musical instruments, besides the organ, to be employed in the music.

In Solemn Mass, by far the greater part is spoken by the celebrant inaudibly, but, apart from a very few parts such as the "Orate Fratres", all that he speaks aloud, such as "Dominus vobiscum" and the four opening words of the Gloria and of the Creed are sung by him. He says quietly for himself everything that the choir sings, except short responses such as "Et cum spiritu tuo" and "Amen". He reads for himself the words of the Epistle and the following chants while the subdeacon sings the Epistle, and he reads the Gospel for himself before the deacon sings the Gospel aloud.

== Structure and ceremonial ==
The Mass begin when the priest rings a bell. The porter opens the sacristy door and the altar servers, deacons and priest and leave the sacristy and enter the church in the following manner: first the thurifer carrying his thurible and boat (or the aspersorium if the Asperges is to be had); next come the acolytes carrying their candles (the custom in Northern European and English-speaking countries is to have a crucifer holding a processional cross walking between the acolytes); the Master of Ceremonies comes next; and finally the three sacred ministers enter in single file in reverse order of precedence (or on either side of the celebrant if he is wearing the cope for the Asperges or some other ceremony before the Mass. The deacon and sub-deacon should be holding the ends of the cope.)

- Asperges (only on Sundays at the principal Mass of the day). The Asperges is only of obligation in cathedral and collegiate churches, but it was required by the bishops of England for all parish churches. This ceremony of sprinkling the congregation with lustral water is performed by the celebrant with the assistance of the other sacred ministers. After blessing the altar, himself, and the sacred ministers and servers, the celebrant then proceeds through the nave of the church to bless the congregation. All the while the choir, or a cantor, is singing the text from Psalm 50, verse 9 (all Biblical references from here on are from the Douay-Rheims Bible) "Thou shalt sprinkle me with hyssop, and I shall be cleansed: thou shalt wash me, and I shall be made whiter than snow." After the sacred ministers have returned to the altar a few verses and responses are sung between the celebrant and everyone else. The sacred ministers then go to the sedilia (the bench or seats where the sacred ministers sit during parts of the Mass) to put on their maniples and to help the celebrant change from cope to chasuble.
- Prayers at the Foot of the Altar. These prayers are said by the sacred ministers standing on the floor at the bottom of the steps leading up to the High Altar. They are also said to each other, kneeling, by the acolytes and those servers sitting in the liturgical choir. If the acolytes are close enough, they may say them with the sacred ministers. These prayers consist primarily of Psalm 42 with the verses said alternately between the celebrant and the other sacred ministers. While these prayers are being said, the musical choir is singing the text of the Introit. After the prayers are finished, all rise. The sacred ministers ascend the steps to the altar to cense it.
- Introit. This text of the Mass varies daily. It usually consists of Scriptural or religious text, followed by a Psalm verse, followed by the Doxology. Then the Scriptural or religious text is repeated. This is usually being sung while the sacred ministers are saying the Prayers at the Foot of the Altar mentioned above and while they incense the altar. After Prayers at the Foot of the Altar, the sacred ministers ascend the steps to the altar, the thurifer brings his thurible, or censer, and a 'boat' of incense. The celebrant places incense into the thurible, blesses it and then proceeds to cense the altar, accompanied by the other ministers. After he is finished, he hands the thurible to the deacon and the deacon censes him. The thurible is then given back to the thurifer, who departs to the sacristy until he is needed again. The sacred ministers then form a "semicircle" (really a line) on the altar steps—the celebrant on the top platform (called a footpace), the deacon on a middle step, and the sub-deacon on the bottom step. The Master of Ceremonies then helps the celebrant find his place in the Missal. The priest makes the sign of the cross and recites in a low voice to himself the Introit that the choir has already sung. All bow with him when he recites the Doxology. Meanwhile, the choir, after completing the Introit, begins to sing the Kyrie Eleison.
- Kyrie Eleison. When the celebrant has finished reciting the Introit, he recites, again independently of the choir, the Kyrie Eleison alternately with the Master of Ceremonies (the other sacred ministers may join in with the M.C.) After this is finished the sacred ministers either form a straight line, remaining on their respective steps, until the Kyrie is nearly finished or they bow to the cross and descend the steps to sit at the sedilia if the musical setting for the Kyrie is particularly long.
- Gloria in Excelsis. Toward the end of the Kyrie, the sacred ministers walk (still staying in a line) to the center of the altar. If they have been sitting, all rise, save the celebrant, who waits until his biretta has been collected by the deacon. The three sacred ministers genuflect at the foot of the altar steps, then ascend and form a line. (The deacon and subdeacon usually lift the ends of the celebrant's alb whenever they ascend the steps together, and place their closest hand under his elbows when they descend together.) The celebrant intones, i.e. sings the first few words of, the Gloria, after which the choir sings the rest and the deacon and subdeacon ascend the steps to stand at either side of the celebrant, while he says in a low voice the remainder of the Gloria independently of the choir. When they are finished they remain in this position until the singing is nearly done or, if it is a long musical setting, they may go down and sit (first genuflecting), as mentioned above at the Kyrie. (Note: The Gloria is omitted from Masses of the season during Advent, Septuagesima, Lent, and Passiontide, as well as from ferias outside Christmastide, Epiphanytide, and Paschaltide.)
- Collect (sometimes called the Oration). Towards the end of the singing of the Gloria in excelsis (or Kyrie if the Gloria be omitted) the sacred ministers head to the center of the altar in a line. When the singing has finished, the Celebrant turns away from the altar and says, with hands extended to shoulder width only (Ritus servandus in celebratione Missae, V, 1), "Dominus vobiscum" ("The Lord be with you"), to which is replied, "Et cum spiritu tuo" ("And with thy spirit"). The Celebrant then, with hands extended to no more than shoulder width and palms facing each other, reads the collect or prayer of the day. (Any time the verb read is used, this should be interpreted as sing in monotone, often with note variations at certain punctuations, and a special tone for the ending. The entirety of the Mass, as heard by the congregation, is sung—except the blessing, which is sung only by a bishop—though the priest recites quietly for himself everything that the choir sings, apart from short responses such as "Et cum spiritu tuo").
- Epistle. Towards the end of the collect (or the last collect if there be more than one) the Master of Ceremonies heads to the credence table to get the Epistolary or book of readings. He hands it to the Subdeacon, who bows to the crucifix at the end of the collect, if the Holy Name of Jesus is mentioned, reverences the altar and then the liturgical choir (as opposed to the musical choir) if there be one. He then stands on the floor aligned somewhat behind the Celebrant and chants the Epistle or other reading proper to the day. Meanwhile, the Priest too recites the Epistle in a low voice, and the Deacon, also in a low voice, responds "Deo gratias" ("Thanks be to God") at the end. The Subdeacon next reverences the choir, and then the altar. Ascending the steps to where the Celebrant is, he kneels while the Priest blesses him, then kisses the hand of the Celebrant, who has placed it on the Epistolary. He then hands the Epistolary to the Master of Ceremonies, who puts it back on the credence table or in some other appropriate place.
- Gradual, Alleluia (or Tract), & Sequence. Once the Subdeacon has finished reading the Epistle, the musical choir begins to sing the Gradual & Alleluia (or Tract, instead of the Alleluia, in Lent), and occasionally a Sequence in certain Masses, which the Celebrant should have finished reciting for himself, after his private reading of the Epistle, before the Subdeacon has finished reading the Epistle.
- Gospel. While the choir sings the Gradual and Alleluia (or Tract) the subdeacon carries the missal to the Gospel side of the altar where the priest will read the Gospel in a low voice. Meanwhile, the Master of Ceremonies takes the Gospel book off the credence table and gives it to the deacon who then places it on the altar. After the celebrant finishes reading the Gospel, the sacred ministers go to the center of the altar and the Celebrant places incense in the thurible in the usual manner. The two acolytes with candles, the Master of Ceremonies, the thurifer with the thurible, the subdeacon, and the deacon with the Gospel book assemble at the bottom of the altar steps, genuflect, and go in procession to the Gospel side of the sanctuary. The subdeacon holds the Gospel book while the deacon sings the Gospel.
- Sermon (optional)
- Credo. The Celebrant intones the Nicene Creed with the words "Credo in unum Deum." While the choir sings the Creed, the sacred ministers recite the Creed in the low voice at the altar. All genuflect at the Incarnatus ("Et incarnatus est" to "et homo factus est."). The deacon then goes to the credence table, picks up the burse containing the corporal, and then spreads the corporal on the altar. (Note: The Credo is only said on Sundays and on feasts of greater solemnity.)
- Offertory. While the choir sings the offertory the ministers prepare the altar. The subdeacon goes to the credence table and receives the humeral veil. Having set the chalice veil aside, the subdeacon then carries the chalice, paten, purifacator, and pall to the altar. The celebrant receives the paten with the host. He places the host on the corporal while saying "Suscipe sancte pater...". While the celebrant says the "Deus qui humanae..." the deacon pours the wine into the chalice, and after the celebrant blesses the water, the subdeacon pours a small amount of water into the chalice. With the paten in his right hand the subdeacon goes at stands facing the altar on the lowest step with the humeral veil covering his arms and the paten. Incense is then placed into the thurible and blessed by the celebrant. The oblations are incensed first, and then the altar is incensed while the celebrant says the beginning of Psalm 140 "Dirigatur Domine...". The deacon incenses the celebrant and any priests in the choir after which the thurifer incenses the rest of the altar party, followed by those in choir, and then the congregation.
- Secret. After the celebrant finishes praying "Suscipe sancta Trinitas..." he says the secret prayers of the Mass in the low voice. He concludes the secret aloud "Per omnia secula seculorum. Amen."
- Preface. The celebrating priest sings either the common preface or a proper preface following the Sursum Corda.
- Sanctus. Following the preface, the ministers recite the full text of the Sanctus in a low voice, and the choir begins to sing it. While the celebrating priest then quietly says the Canon of the Mass, the choir continues its singing of the Sanctus, pausing before the part that begins with "Benedictus qui venit", which it sings after the consecration (pre-1962). Post-1962, the Benedictus immediately follows.
- Canon of the Mass The Canon of the Mass is said by the celebrant entirely in the low voice. The deacon stands to the side of the celebrant and kneels on the first step for the consecration. Both the host and the chalice are elevated by the celebrant immediately after they are consecrated. The deacon is responsible for covering and uncovering the chalice with the pall.
- Pater noster. The celebrant sings the Pater noster aloud. At this time the subdeacon places the paten back on the altar and removes the humeral veil.
- Agnus Dei. The ministers say the Agnus Dei at the altar in the low voice while the choir sings the Agnus Dei aloud.
- The Pax. The kiss of peace is passed from the celebrant to the deacon, who in turn then gives the kiss of peace to the subdeacon. The subdeacon extends the kiss of peace to clergy attending Mass in the choir. While the choir continues to sing the Agnus Dei, the priest says the prayers prescribed for the preparation for his communion.
- Distribution of Holy Communion. If Holy Communion is to be distributed to the congregation, the Confiteor is said, followed by "Ecce Agnus Dei...". The priest then distributes Holy Communion to the faithful, placing the Host on the tongue of each person who receives. The choir sings the Communion Antiphon at any point after Ecce Agnus Dei...
- Ablutions. The celebrant cleans the chalice and his fingers with water and wine. The subdeacon then takes then covers the chalice and paten with the chalice veil and carries them to the credence table. After the ablutions, the celebrant goes to the Epistle side of the altar and reads the communion antiphon in the low voice.
- Postcommunion. After singing "Dominus vobiscum", the celebrant sings the post-communion prayer or prayers.
- Dismissal. Facing the congregation, the deacon sings the dismissal, which is either "Ite Missa est" or "Benedicamus Domino".
- Blessing. The celebrant places his joined hands on the altar and says in a low voice the prayer Placeat tibi, sancta Trinitas for himself and those for whom he has offered Mass. Then he kisses the altar and, turning towards the congregation, blesses them "in nomine Patris, et Filii, et Spiritus Sancti", making over them the sign of the cross.
- Last Gospel. The celebrant usually goes to the Gospel side of the altar and reads the Last Gospel. Since the promulgation of the 1962 Missal, which lists under six headings the occasions when the Last Gospel is omitted, the only passage used, with the exception of Palm Sunday, is John 1:1–14, in the recitation of which all genuflect at "Et Verbum caro factum est". At low Masses said on Palm Sunday (when palms are not distributed, as they should not be, unless perhaps this is the only Mass on that day) the Last Gospel is the one that is appointed for the ceremony of the blessing of the palms. When earlier editions of the Roman Missal were in use, a Last Gospel was read at every Mass, usually John 1:1–14. When there were two coinciding liturgical days (feasts, ferias or vigils) that each had a proper Gospel (one not found in the common Masses used for the various categories of saints' feast days, such as "common of confessors"), the Gospel appointed for the liturgical day being commemorated was read as the Last Gospel, just as the collect, secret, and postcommunion prayers are commemorated for that day. Then all face the altar or the Marian icon and sing the Marian Antiphon of the appointed season. The exit procession then forms in the following order: crucifer between the two acolytes, the master of ceremonies, and the sacred ministers.

== See also ==
- Use of Preconciliar rites after the Second Vatican Council
- Eucharistic theology – Branch of Christian theology
- Pre-Tridentine Mass – Forms of the Mass before 1570
