= Missa cantata =

Sung mass without ministers

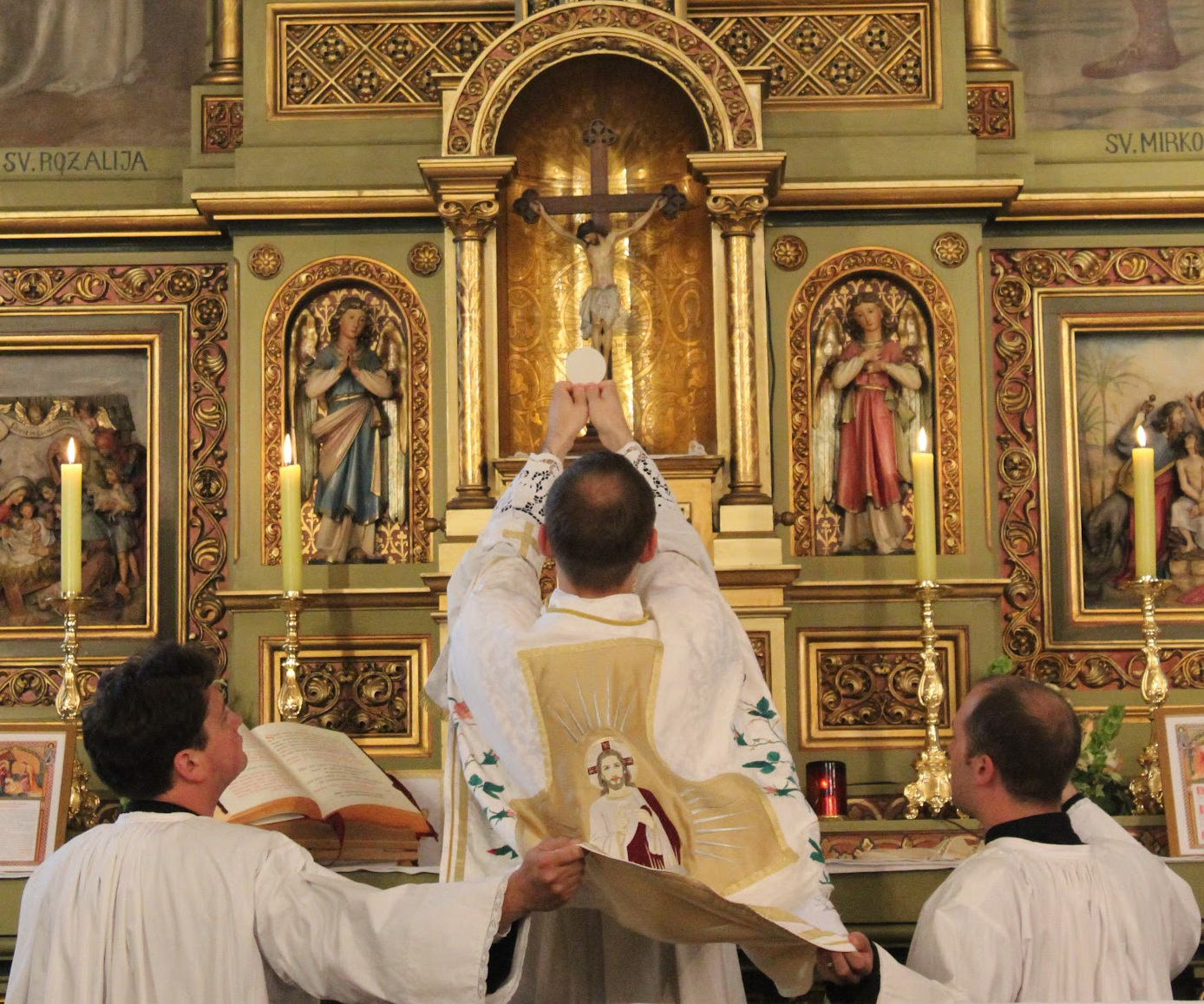
Elevation of the Host during consecration at a Missa cantata.

Missa cantata (Latin for "sung Mass") is a form of Tridentine Mass defined officially in 1960 as a sung Mass celebrated without sacred ministers, i.e., deacon and subdeacon.

== Pre-1960 name ==
Documents of the Holy See such as the Decree of the Congregation of Sacred Rites of 14 March 1906 spoke of Missa cantata sine Ministris, meaning Sung (or Chanted) Mass without the Ministers. The 19th-century Ceremonial for the Use of the Catholic Churches in the United States of America (commonly called the "Baltimore Ceremonial" because published by request of the Third Plenary Council of Baltimore of 1884) used the name High Mass without Deacon or Sub-Deacon.

== Classification ==
The Baltimore Ceremonial thus classified the Missa cantata as a High Mass. The early 20th-century Catholic Encyclopedia said, on the contrary, that a Missa cantata "is really a low Mass, since the essence of high Mass is not the music but the deacon and subdeacon. Only in churches which have no ordained person except one priest, and in which high Mass is thus impossible, is it allowed to celebrate the Mass (on Sundays and feasts) with most of the adornment borrowed from high Mass, with singing and (generally) with incense."

In 1960, Pope John XXIII's Code of Rubrics distinguished the Missa cantata both from a high Mass and from low Mass. Under the number 271, it defined the forms of Mass as follows:

Masses are of two kinds: sung Masses (in cantu) and low Masses (Missa lecta).

A Mass is called a sung Mass, when the celebrant actually sings those parts which the rubrics require to be sung; otherwise it is called a low Mass.

Moreover, a sung Mass, when celebrated with the assistance of sacred ministers, is called a solemn or High Mass (Missa solemnis); when celebrated without sacred ministers, it is called a Missa cantata.

== Ceremonial ==
The Missa cantata came into use during the 18th century and was intended for use in non-Catholic countries where the services of a deacon or a subdeacon (or clergy to fill these parts in the ceremony of the Mass) were not easily had. It was intended to be used in place of Solemn Mass on Sundays and major feast days.

The use of incense at a Missa cantata was at first forbidden, but became general: "The Sacred Congregation of Rites has on several occasions (9 June 1884; 7 December 1888) forbidden the use of incense at a Missa Cantata; nevertheless, exceptions have been made for several dioceses, and the custom of using it is now generally tolerated." General permission was finally granted in the 1960 Code of Rubrics, which stated: "The incensations that are obligatory in Solemn Mass are permitted in every Missa Cantata".

The parts sung by the priest are to be sung in Gregorian chant. More elaborate musical settings of the choir's parts may also be used.

== Current situation ==
The rigid distinction between a sung Mass and a low Mass in the Roman Rite was changed in the 1969 revision of the Roman Missal. The General Instruction of the Roman Missal states: "It is very appropriate that the priest sing those parts of the Eucharistic Prayer for which musical notation is provided." Under the heading "The Importance of Singing", it says: "Great importance should therefore be attached to the use of singing in the celebration of the Mass, with due consideration for the culture of the people and abilities of each liturgical assembly. Although it is not always necessary (e.g., in weekday Masses) to sing all the texts that are of themselves meant to be sung, every care should be taken that singing by the ministers and the people is not absent in celebrations that occur on Sundays and on holy days of obligation."
