= Deutsche Singmesse =

Low mass form

The Deutsche Singmesse is a form of (Tridentine) Low Mass that developed in German-speaking countries.

== Historical precursors ==
In Austria, congregational singing of sacred texts in Old High German at Easter Masses is attested by medieval manuscripts dating as early as the twelfth century. The hymn Christ ist erstanden, translated from the Easter sequence Victimae paschali laudes, became very popular, sung with processions and also sung before the Gospel at Mass, in alternation with the Latin text. With the success of that translation, vernacular versions of other feast-day sequences followed.

In addition, vernacular adaptations of parts of the Ordinary of the Mass appeared as early as the 1260s, when a homily of Berthold of Regensburg describes a profession of faith which was sung after the Latin Credo: "I believe in the Father, I believe in the Son of my Lady Saint Mary, and in the Holy Spirit, Kyrie eleison." By the time of the Council of Trent, vernacular singing was so well-established that the emperor Ferdinand I asked the Council in 1562 to preserve the existing practice and allow vernacular singing in the Mass. In 1581, a hymnal in Prague included metrical adaptations of the Kyrie, Gloria, Credo and the Lord's Prayer.

== Origin ==
The German Singmesse, in its classic form, originated in efforts toward a German-language celebration of the Mass during the Enlightenment era, especially in southern Germany and in Austria, in areas influenced by Josephinism. Together with the Augustinian canon and musician Norbert Hauner, the dean of the Herrenchiemsee abbey, Franz Seraph von Kohlbrenner published his book of songs and prayers Der heilige Gesang zum Gottesdienste in der römisch-katholischen Kirche. Erster Theil, which presented the liturgy in the German language, at Landshut in 1777. In this book for the first time the service is conceived as a Singmesse, a form of Mass sung by the faithful. The still popular Advent hymn "Tauet, Himmel, den Gerechten", for example, appears here as an offertory song during the Sundays of Advent.

In 1795 Michael Haydn reworked Hauner's melodic settings and created his own Deutsches vollständiges Hoch-Amt from them. This series of songs for the individual parts of the Mass (which were still spoken softly by the priest in Latin) is usually named for the first lines of the opening song Hier liegt vor deiner Majestät or simply designated as the Haydn Mass. The text reflects the spirit of the Enlightenment and, through the Singmesse, it has become part of German Catholic heritage. This second setting is the best known Singmesse and appears to this day in several regional editions of the 1975 Catholic hymnal Gotteslob.

As a matter of liturgical history, the Singmesse varieties replaced the orchestral Masses previously used, which Kaiser Joseph II had forbidden in his domain.

The most famous 19th-century Singmesse, the 1826 Deutsche Messe by Franz Schubert, is based on Haydn's exemplar. Like his, it is not a setting of the classic Mass Ordinary, but instead offers German-language songs whose sensibility is freely related to the expressions in the Ordinary, and that express the feelings of the worshippers in Romantic style.

Other composers who wrote works in the form of the Singmesse include Leopold Mozart and Franz Xaver Gruber.

== The Betsingmesse ==
Following the recommendations of Romano Guardini and the Benedictines of Maria Laach Abbey under Abbot Ildefons Herwegen, the Augustinian canon Pius Parsch of Klosterneuburg Monastery celebrated so-called "Community Masses" (Gemeinschaftsmessen) in the Church of St. Gertrude (Klosterneuburg) in 1922, in which parts of the Mass were sung by the people in the German language. By this, he wanted to develop active participation by the worshippers and a sense of relationship with early Christianity. These celebrations amounted to the birth of the liturgical movement in Austria and Germany. A groundbreaking event was the celebration of a Betsingmesse at the Vienna Catholic convention (Katholikentag) in 1933.

In the Betsingmesse parts of the Mass propers (the variable parts of the Mass) were presented in the form of German songs. German sung forms or songs were also developed or appointed for the Mass Ordinary. At the same time, the texts were spoken in Latin by the priest, just as before, so the two-track structure of the priestly and congregational action was still present.

== Later developments ==
The Betsingmesse became obsolete with the liturgical reform introduced after the Second Vatican Council and with the introduction of vernacular liturgy in the celebration of the Missa cum populo.

The tradition of carrying out parts of the liturgy in the form of German songs that are not necessarily a German rendering of those parts of the liturgy: e.g., by a "Song at the Gloria" or a "Song at the Sanctus", however, has been retained in many parishes, even if it is regarded critically by liturgists and is not supported by the official documents as part of the modern Roman rite.

== Additional Literature ==
- Adolf Adam/Rupert Berger: Pastoralliturgisches Handlexikon. Freiburg: Herder 1990, s.v. "Betsingmesse", pp. 61f
- Karl Eder: Auf dem Weg zur Teilnahme der Gemeinde am Gottesdienst: Bamberger Gebet- und Gesangbücher von 1575 bis 1824. St. Ottilien: EOS-Verl. 1993 (Dissertation: Theologische Reihe; Vol. 56, and: University of Bamberg, Thesis, 1992/93) ISBN 3-88096-446-7
- Barbara Krätschmer: "Die deutsche Singmesse der Aufklärung unter besonderer Berücksichtigung der Deutschen Hochämter von Johann Michael Haydn." In: Singende Kirche 33 (1986), p. 11–17
- Pius Parsch: Volksliturgie. Klosterneuburg 1940
- Pius Parsch: Klosterneuburger Betsingmesse. 9th edition, Wien-Klosterneuburg: Volksliturgischer Verlag 1940
