= Advent song =

Christmas-related song

Advent songs (German: Adventslieder) are songs and hymns intended for Advent, the four weeks of preparation for Christmas. Topics of the time of expectation are the hope for a Messiah, prophecies, and the symbolism of light, among others. Several of the songs are part of hymnals such as the German Catholic Gotteslob (GL) and the Protestant Evangelisches Gesangbuch (EG).

This is a dynamic list and may never be able to satisfy particular standards for completeness.

== 4th century ==
- Veni redemptor gentium

== 6th century ==
- O Antiphons
- Vox clara ecce intonat

== 12th century ==
- Veni, veni, Emmanuel (the most common setting in the Anglophone world dates to the 19th century)

== 13th century ==
- Angelus ad virginem
- Gabriel's Message

== 14th century ==
- Sei uns willkommen, Herre Christ

== 15th century ==
- Adam lay ybounden
- The Cherry-Tree Carol
- Es kommt ein Schiff, geladen
- Ther is no rose of swych vertu

== 16th century ==
- Der Morgenstern ist aufgedrungen
- Es ist ein Ros entsprungen
- Nun komm, der Heiden Heiland
- Of the Father's Heart Begotten
- Tomorrow Shall Be My Dancing Day
- Wachet auf, ruft uns die Stimme

== 17th century ==
- Conditor alme siderum
- Macht hoch die Tür
- Mit Ernst, o Menschenkinder
- O Heiland, reiß die Himmel auf
- Rorate cæli (as a separate Advent hymn)
- Venez divin Messie
- Wie soll ich dich empfangen

== 18th century ==
- Come, Thou Long Expected Jesus
- Jesus Christ the Apple Tree
- Lo! He comes with clouds descending
- On Jordan's Bank the Baptist's Cry
- Tauet, Himmel, den Gerechten

== 19th century ==
- Bereden väg för Herran
- The Holly and the Ivy
- Hosianna, Davids son
- Lasst uns froh und munter sein
- Leise rieselt der Schnee
- Macht weit die Pforten in der Welt
- Maria durch ein Dornwald ging
- Meine Seele, dank und singe
- Tochter Zion, freue dich

== 20th century ==
- Advent är mörker och kyla
- Adventstid
- Canticle of the Turning
- Dawning Light of Our Salvation
- Det är advent
- Die Nacht ist vorgedrungen
- In das Warten dieser Welt
- Kündet allen in der Not
- Long Ago, Prophets Knew
- Singet fröhlich im Advent
- Und unser lieben Frauen
- Up, Awake, and Away! (Traditional Galician carol arranged by Philip Ledger)
- Vi tänder ett ljus i advent
- Wir sagen euch an den lieben Advent

== Secular Advent songs ==
- Advent, Advent, ein Lichtlein brennt
- Leise rieselt der Schnee
- Morgen, Kinder, wird’s was geben

== Literature ==
- Gerhard Engelsberger: Bilder vom Kommen Gottes. Dichter, Bilder und Botschaft der Adventslieder. Evangelischer Presseverband für Baden, Karlsruhe [1992], ISBN 3-87210-341-5.
