= Two Motets, Op. 74 (Brahms) =

Musical composition by Johannes Brahms

Two Motets
- Motets by Johannes Brahms
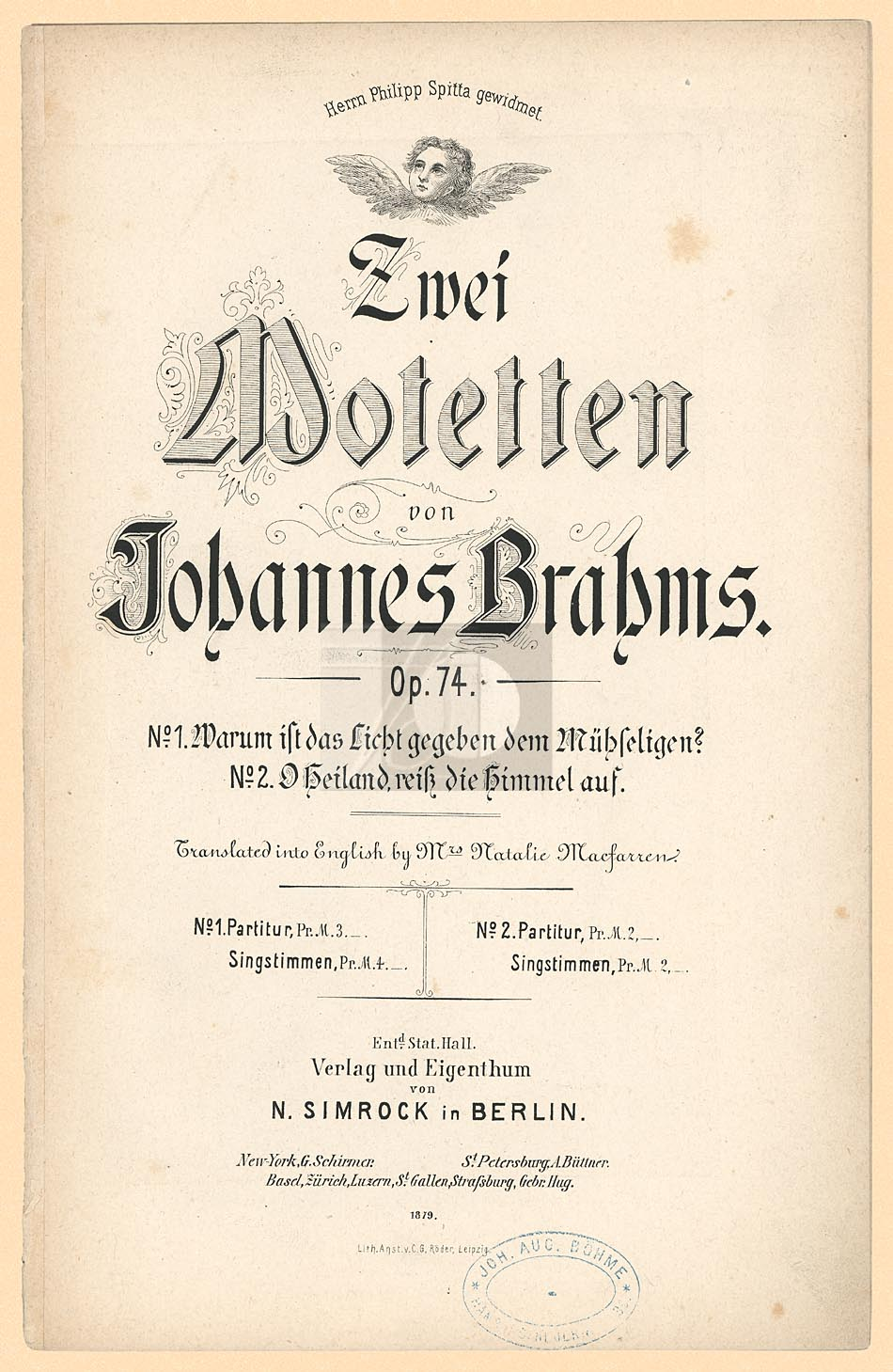
- Cover of the first print
- Other name: "Warum ist das Licht gegeben dem Mühseligen?"; "O Heiland, reiß die Himmel auf"
- Opus: 74
- Text: Biblical, chorales
- Composed: 1877, 1863
- Dedication: Philipp Spitta
- Published: 1878
- Scoring: Mixed choir

Two Motets (Zwei Motetten), Op. 74, are two sacred motets for unaccompanied mixed choir by Johannes Brahms, published together. Number 1, composed in 1877 in several movements, is Warum ist das Licht gegeben dem Mühseligen? (Why has light been given to the weary of soul?), based on Biblical texts and a chorale. Number 2, believed to have been composed in 1863/64, is O Heiland, reiß die Himmel auf, containing different settings of the stanzas of Friedrich von Spee's "O Heiland, reiß die Himmel auf" (O Saviour, tear open the heavens). The two motets were published by N. Simrock in December 1878 and dedicated to Philipp Spitta.

== History ==
Brahms composed the two motets based on Biblical texts and chorales but without a liturgical occasion in mind. He first wrote O Heiland, reiß die Himmel auf as individual settings of the five stanzas of Friedrich von Spee's Advent song "O Heiland, reiß die Himmel auf", possibly in 1863/64. In Pörtschach in 1877, he wrote Warum ist das Licht gegeben dem Mühseligen?. As was the case for his earlier Ein deutsches Requiem, he chose biblical texts from the Book of Job, the Book of Lamentations, and the Epistle of James. In the manner of Johann Sebastian Bach, he ended the motet with a chorale, the first stanza of Luther's "Mit Fried und Freud ich fahr dahin".

The two motets were published together by N. Simrock in December 1878, with a dedication to Philipp Spitta. The motets have been performed and published individually.

== Themes and movements ==
Brahms structured the motet that was printed first (i.e. Warum ist das Licht gegeben) in four movements, three on Biblical verses in Martin Luther's translation, and, as a closing chorale, the first stanza from Luther's hymn "Mit Fried und Freud ich fahr dahin". The first movement is based on a longer biblical passage, Job 3:20-23, full of existential questions about the misery of human life. The first line is translated as "Wherefore is light given to him that is in misery, and life unto the bitter in soul" in the King James Version (KJV). The second movement sets a short line, Lamentations 3:41, a request to turn to God, in the KJV "Let us lift up our heart with our hands unto God in the heavens." The third movement uses James 5:11, which is a commentary on the book of Job, recalling his patience and calling those happy who endure (KJV: "Behold, we count them happy which endure. Ye have heard of the patience of Job, and have seen the end of the Lord; that the Lord is very pitiful, and of tender mercy.")

=== No. 1, Warum ist das Licht gegeben dem Mühseligen? ===
1. Warum ist das Licht gegeben dem Mühseligen? Langsam und ausdrucksvoll, D minor
2. Lasset uns unser Herz samt den Händen aufheben. Wenig bewegter, F major
3. Siehe wir preisen selig, die erduldet haben. Langsam und sanft, C major
4. Mit Fried und Freud ich fahr' dahin (chorale), D dorian

=== No. 2, O Heiland, reiß' die Himmel auf ===
1. First stanza, Tempo giusto, F dorian
2. Second stanza, Tempo giusto, F dorian
3. Third stanza, Tempo giusto, F dorian
4. Fourth stanza, Adagio, C minor
5. Fifth stanza, Allegro, F dorian

== Music ==
Brahms wrote No. 1 in memory of Hermann Göß, who had suffered from an illness for years and died prematurely. Brahms used material from a Latin mass, Missa canonica, which he had begun in 1856. He inserted a fugue for the first movement and a canon for six voices in the second movement. The motet begins with two settings of the question "Warum?" (Why?) in homophony, the first time strong and the second time soft and diminishing. The motif reappears with slight changes to the expression, structuring the sections of the first movement and ending it.

== Literature ==
- Michael Heinemann: Zwei Motetten für gemischten Chor a cappella op. 74. In: Wolfgang Sandberger (ed.): Brahms-Handbuch. Metzler, Weimar 2009, pp. 309–311.
