= Tauet, Himmel, den Gerechten =

Advent hymn in German

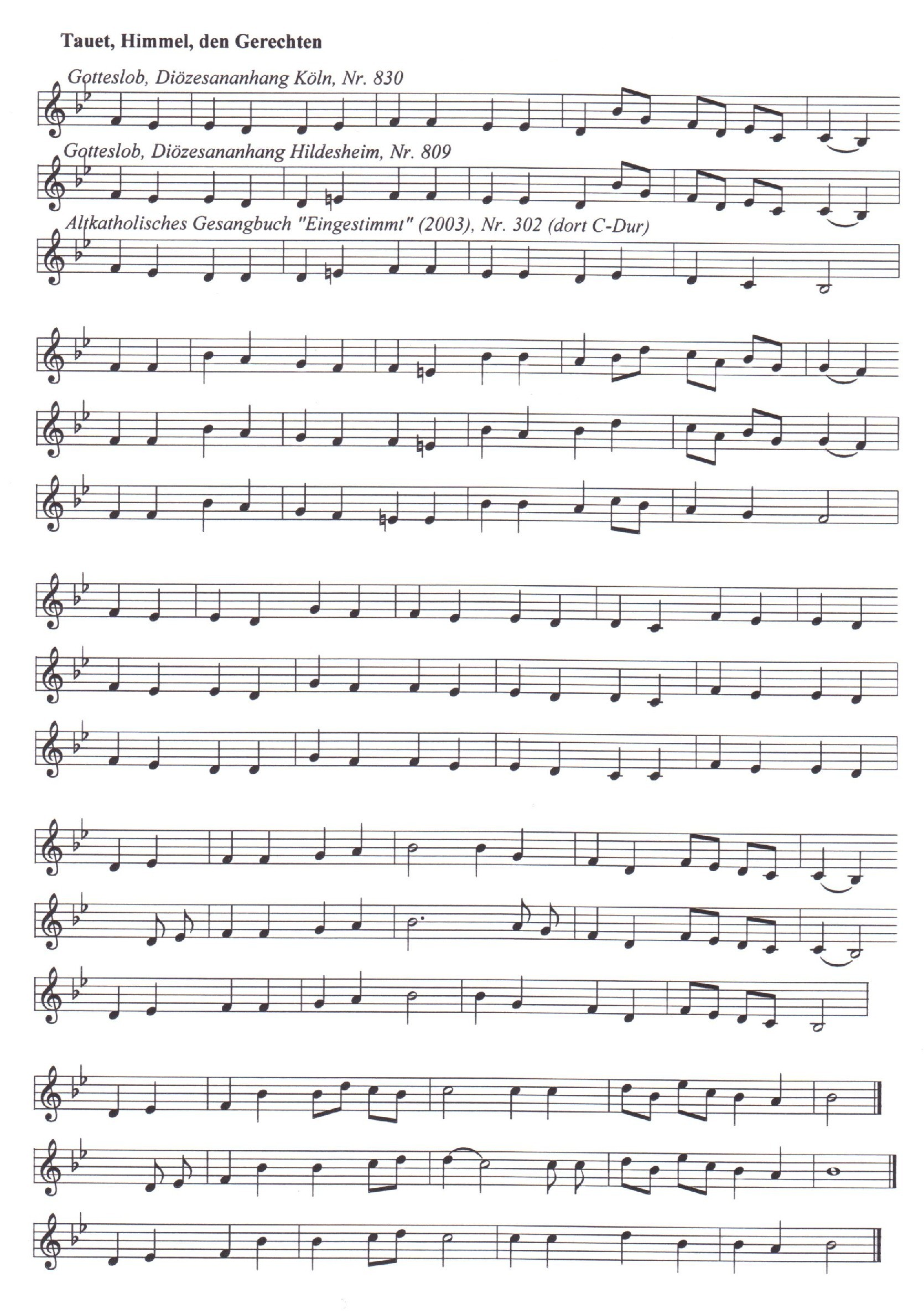
"Tauet, Himmel, den Gerechten", melody by Norbert Hauner (1777) in three recent versions

"Tauet, Himmel, den Gerechten" is an Advent hymn in German, in the Catholic tradition of the Rorate masses.

== History ==
The first text version of "Tauet, Himmel, den Gerechten" was written by the Jesuit Michael Denis, published in Vienna in 1774 in his collection Geistliche Lieder zum Gebrauche der hohen Metropolitankirche bey St. Stephan in Wien und des ganzen wienerischen Erzbistums.

A first melody for the text was composed by Norbert Hauner from Herrenchiemsee Abbey, published in a 1777 hymnal edited by Franz von Kohlbrenner, Landshuter Gesangbuch. This arioso melody was better suitable for solo singing than for a congregation. It was simplified into the most common melody.

The hymn is not part of the common Catholic German hymnal Gotteslob, but appears in all its regional sections, due to the differences in text and melody. Some sections offer two versions, and the Diocese of Essen even three versions.

== Text ==
The text is inspired by the Latin version of a passage from the Book of Isaiah, the introitus for the fourth Sunday in Advent. It begins in chapter 45, verse 8, "Rorate, caeli, desuper, et nubes pluant iustum". It expresses the longing for the arrival of the "Righteous", interpreted as Messiah, Saviour or Reddemer. Versions of the hymn text name him "Mittler" (mediator), "Retter" (saviour) or "Richter" (judge). The original Hebrew term means justice. It was interpreted as a person in the early Christian Church.

Other stanzas allude, depending on the version, to the annunciation and visitation, and to the birth of John the Baptist, and contain a general call for repentance.
