= Deutsches Hochamt =

- by Michael Haydn
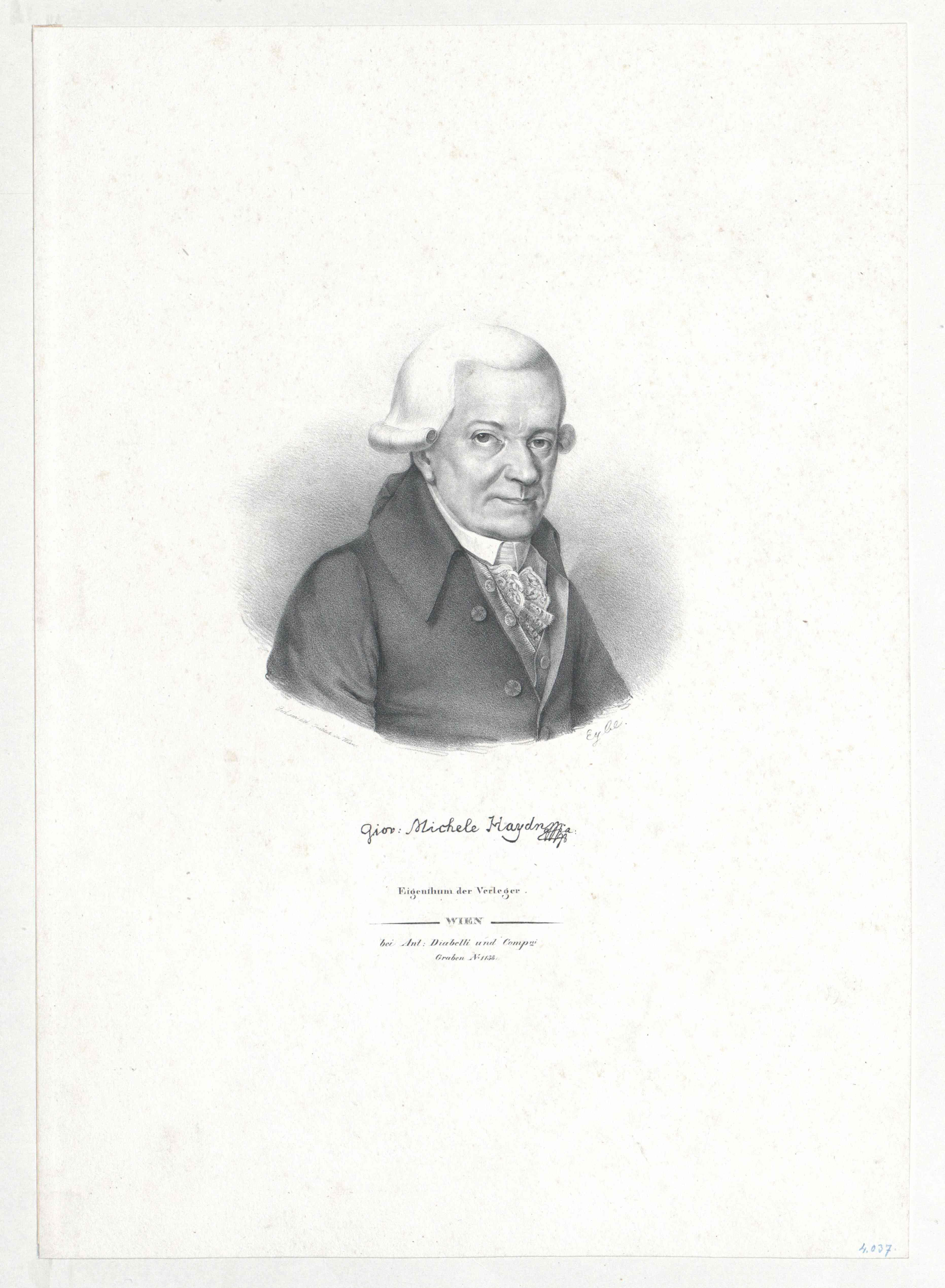
- Michael Haydn, the composer
- English: German High Mass
- Catalogue: MH 560
- Year: 1800
- Form: Mass
- Text: by Franz Seraph von Kohlbrenner
- Language: German
- Movements: ten
- Vocal: SATB choir
- Instrumental: orchestra

Deutsches Hochamt (German High Mass) is the title common to several mass compositions by Michael Haydn, setting the mass ordinary in German by Franz Seraph von Kohlbrenner. Three of the works require trained singers and orchestra, while a fourth is kept simple to be sung by the congregation as a Deutsche Singmesse (Betsingmesse). His best-known German High Mass is catalogued as MH 560. Haydn's masses in German are also known by the incipit of the first of ten songs, "Hier liegt vor deiner Majestät".

== History ==
Johann Michael Haydn set several times a German text published in Landshut in 1777 in the hymnal Landshuter Gesangbuch by Franz Seraph von Kohlbrenner. The full title of the hymnal is Der heilige Gesang zum Gottesdienste in der römisch-katholischen Kirche (The holy singing for the divine service in the Roman Catholic Church). It promoted liturgical singing in German. Haydn's masses are also known by the incipit of the first of ten songs, "Hier liegt vor deiner Majestät" (Here lies before Your Majesty). In the hymnal, the songs which correspond to elements of the mass came with melodies by Norbert Hauner. The texts reflect the spirit of the Age of Enlightenment. They became common in Austria, also by Haydns settings. His best-known German mass is catalogued as MH 560, which has been described as "musically the epitome of south-German/Austrian Catholicism".

== Structure ==
Kohlbrenner wrote ten songs, related to the Order of Mass.

- Opening / Kyrie: "Hier liegt vor deiner Majestät im Staub die Christenschar" (The group of Christians lies here in the dust before Your Majesty)
- Gloria: "Gott soll gepriesen werden" (God shall be praised)
- Responsorial song: "Aus Gottes Munde gehet das Evangelium" (From God's mouth goes the gospel)
- Credo: "Allmächtiger, vor dir im Staube bekennt dich deine Kreatur" (Almighty, Your creatures confess You in the dust before You)
- Preparation of gifts: "Nimm an, o Herr, die Gaben" (Accept, Oh Lord, the offerings)
- Sanctus: "Singt: Heilig, heilig, heilig" (Sing: Holy, holy, holy)
- After the Consecration: "Sieh, Vater, von dem höchsten Throne" (Look, Father, from the highest throne)
- Agnus Dei: "Betrachtet ihn in Schmerzen" (Look at him in sorrows)
- Under Communion: "O Herr, ich bin nicht würdig" (O Lord, I am not worthy)
- Thanksgiving: "Nun ist das Lamm geschlachtet" (Now the Lamb is slaughtered), alternatively "In Frieden lasst uns ziehen" (Let us go in peace)

== Deutsches Hochamt, MH 536 ==
Haydn set the text first 1793 in Salzburg. He wrote a composition in A major for four mixed voices, two violins and organ, with the option for two horns or trumpets.

== Deutsches Hochamt, MH 560 ==
Haydn set the text a second time in 1795, the composition which became known best. The melodies are similar to Hauner's from the Landshuter Gesangbuch of 1777, but the composition is regarded as his original work.

The autograph is not extant. It is believed that Haydn wrote only an organ part, with two vocal parts and their text in the upper system, and figured bass in the lower system. When the work was first published by Ignaz Sauer in Vienna in 1800, it was expanded, probably by the publisher, to four voices. A second edition, in 1827 by Tobias Haslinger, offers an optional instrumental setting for two to nine instruments: two clarinets (or two violins), two bassoons, two horns, two trumpets, timpani, double bass (or contrabassoon).

Franz Schubert followed the model of this setting when he wrote his Deutsche Messe.

== Deutsches Hochamt, MH 602 ==
Haydn composed a setting of Kohlbrenner's text in B-flat major for two soprano soloists, a two-part women's choir, two horns and an organ in 1795.

== Deutsches Hochamt, MH 629 ==
Haydn composed a setting of a different text, "Wir werfen uns darnieder", for choir and organ or orchestra, which was published c. 1800.

== Editions ==
- Johann Michael Haydn: Deutsches Hochamt. Hier liegt vor deiner Majestät MH 560. Score. ed. Armin Kircher. Carus, Stuttgart 2006, ISMN M-007-09020-3.

== Literature ==
- Barbara Krätschmer: Die deutsche Singmesse der Aufklärung unter besonderer Berücksichtigung der Deutschen Hochämter von Johann Michael Haydn. In: Singende Kirche 33 (1986), pp 11–17, ISSN 0037-5721.
- Charles H. Sherman, T. Donley Thomas: Johann Michael Haydn (1737–1806), a chronological thematic catalogue of his works. Pendragon Press, Stuyvesant, New York 1993, ISBN 0918728568.
