= Meine Seele, dank und singe =

German Catholic hymn

- German Catholic hymn
- English: "My soul, thank and sing"
- Language: German
- Melody: from Cologne
- Composed: 1741
- Published: 1807

"Meine Seele, dank und singe" ("My soul, thank and sing") is a German Catholic hymn. A first version appeared in Dillingen in 1807, to a 1741 melody from Cologne. Some hymnals have the beginning "Meine Seele, auf und singe". It is part of regional sections of the German Catholic hymnal Gotteslob of 2013. The diocese of Trier has three stanzas as GL 802. The Diocese of Limburg has the first and the third stanza as GL 743 as an Advent song.

== Text and theme ==
The song was originally in three stanzas of eight lines each, rhyming ABABCBCB. The beginning, addressing the singers soul to sing praises and be thankful, is reminiscent of psalms and the Magnificat. In the first stanza, thanks are given for the creation of the world and for the time full of mercy which was promised from the beginning. The second stanza reflects Jesus, born from Mary, as a redeemer of mankind by becoming part of it. In the third stanza, the singer addresses a group to sing with Mary, to be faithful to his word as she was, and to offer sorrow and joy, and all life that he gave, to the Lord of Glory ("Herr der Herrlichkeit").
