= Expectation of the Blessed Virgin Mary =

Catholic feast, 18 December

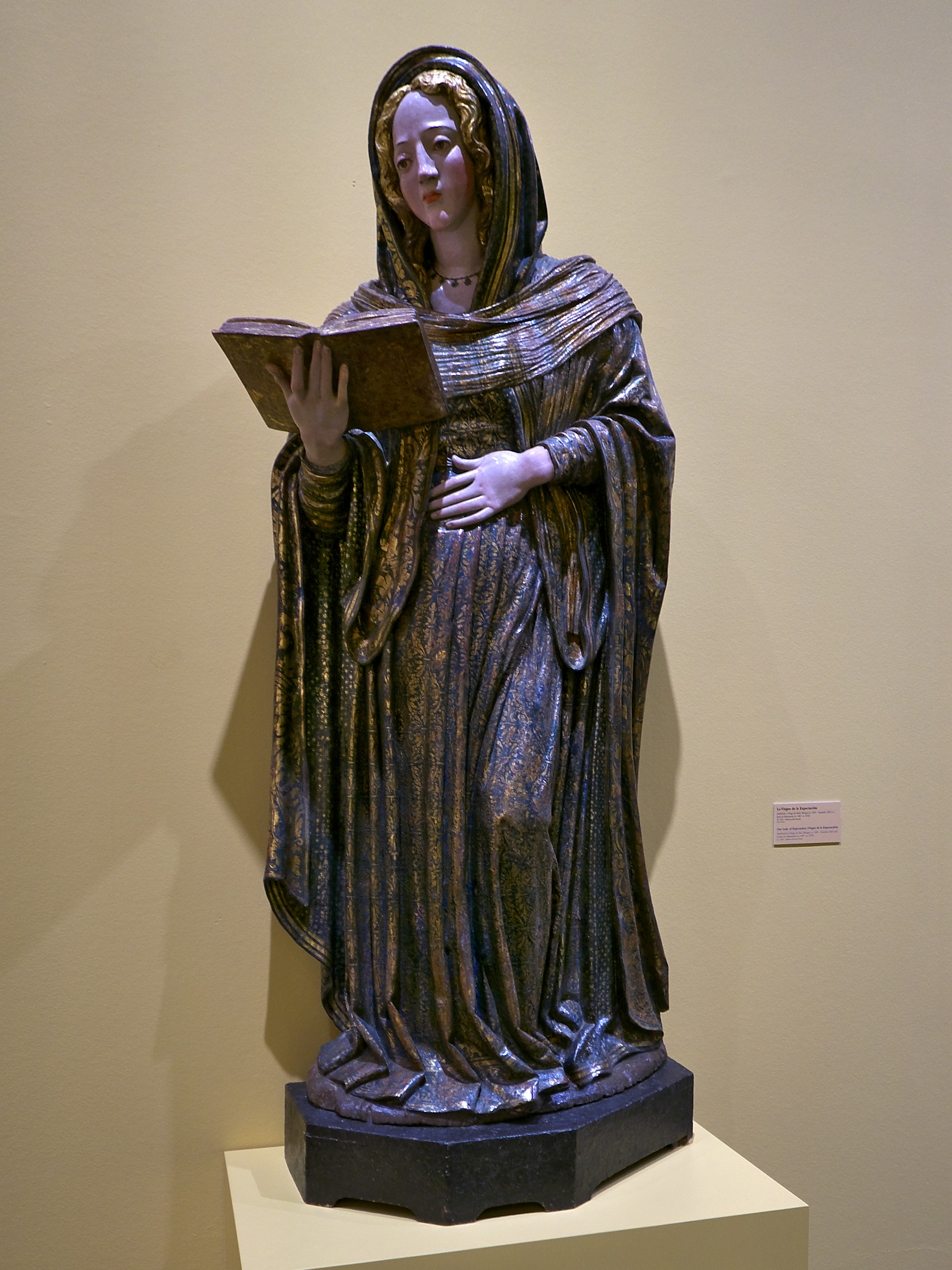
Our Lady of the Expectation, multi-coloured wood statue, 16th century. Museum of Santa Cruz, Toledo, Spain.

The Feast of the Expectation of the Blessed Virgin Mary (Spanish: Nuestra Señora de la Expectación) was a Catholic Feast that was originally celebrated in Spain, but started to be celebrated in other Catholic countries. It is not on the universal calendar, but is still commemorated on December 18 in some places such as Spain, Portugal, Italy and Poland as well as in a few religious orders. The Dominicans honor Mary under the title of "Our Lady of the Expectation".

== History ==
The feast owes its origin to the bishops of the tenth Council of Toledo, in 656. The accompanying of the expectant mother of Jesus became a prominent theme that spread throughout the Iberian Peninsula and Italy during the Middle Ages. A High Mass was sung at a very early hour each morning during the octave, and it became customary that all who were with child would attend, that they might honor Our Lady's Maternity, and seek a blessing upon themselves. "The feast heightens the anticipation of Christmas and makes the last few days of Advent unique opportunities to meditate on what Mary must have been pondering in her heart." It is sometimes joined with a novena beginning on December 16 and ending on Christmas Eve.

== See also ==
- Annunciation
- Rorate Mass
