= Das Grab ist leer, der Held erwacht =

Catholic hymn for Easter

- German Catholic Easter hymn
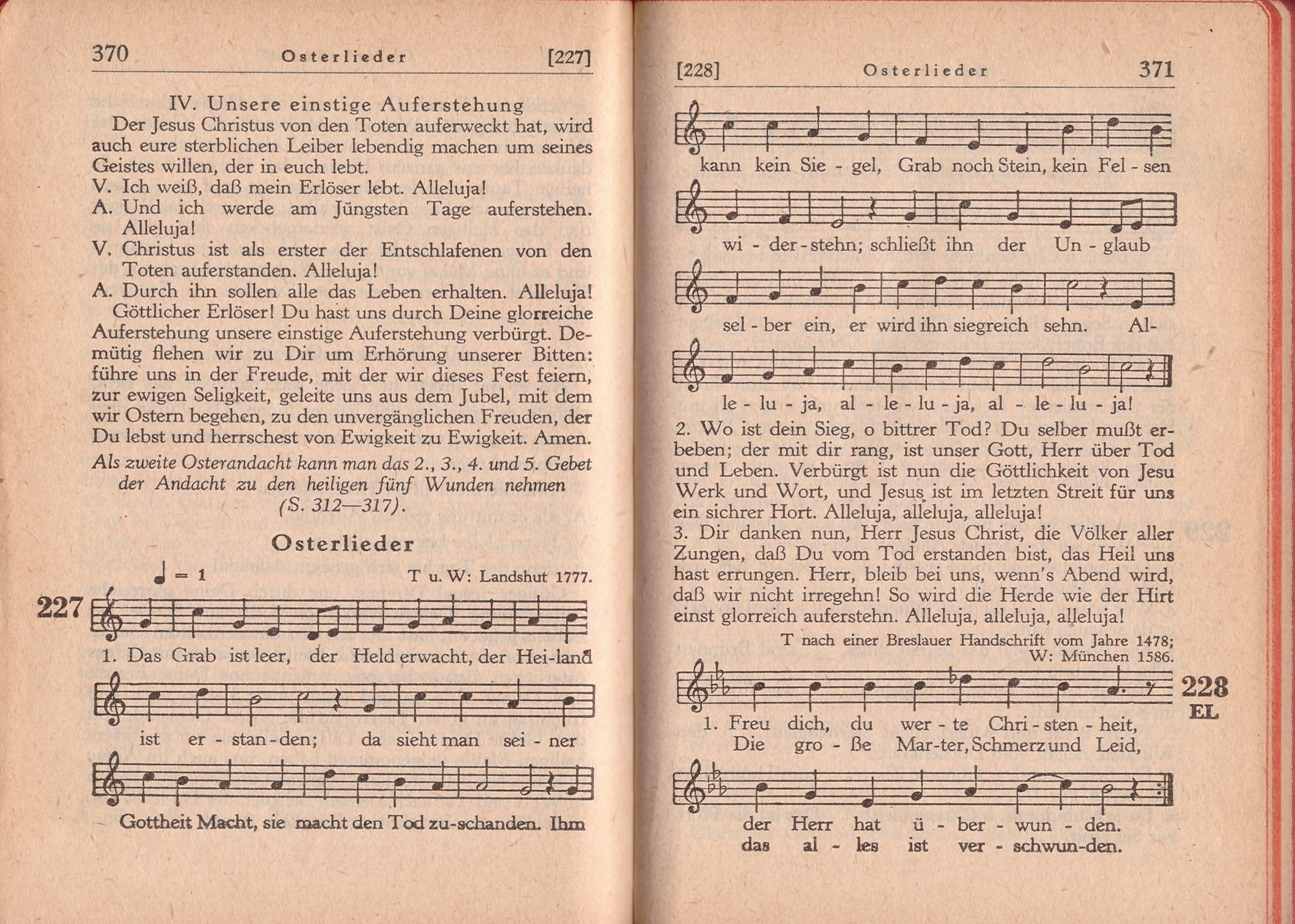
- The hymn in the Paderborn hymnal Sursum Corda
- English: The grave is empty, the hero awake
- Text: by Franz Seraph von Kohlbrenner
- Language: German
- Melody: by Norbert Hauner
- Published: 1777
- Cologne tune Münster tune

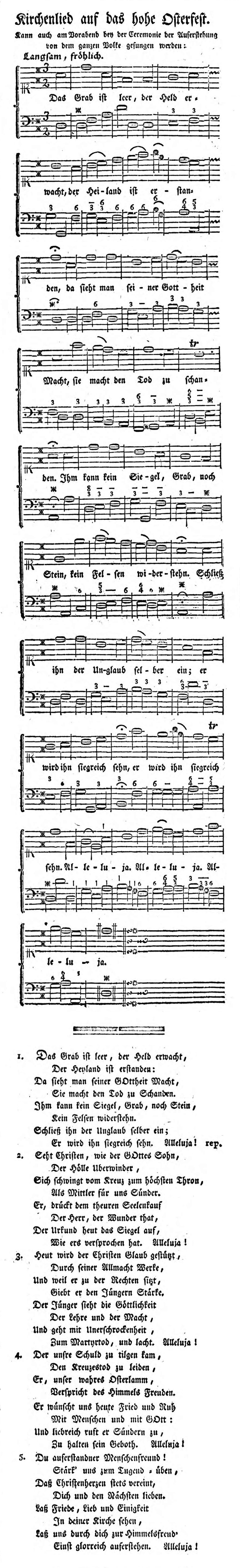
The hymn in the first print, Landshut, 1777, melody and figured bass

"Das Grab ist leer, der Held erwacht" (The grave is empty, the hero awoken) is a Catholic hymn for Easter, first printed in 1777 in the hymnal Landshuter Gesangbuch published by Franz Seraph von Kohlbrenner. Keeping only the first of five stanzas, with additional two stanzas, it appeared in hymnals of the 19th century, and later in different versions in several regional sections of the Catholic hymnal Gotteslob. It is a frequently sung hymn in Easter services.

== History ==
A hymnal appeared in Landshut in 1777, with the full title Der heilige Gesang zum Gottesdienste in der römisch-katholischen Kirche (The holy chant for the divine service in the Roman Catholic Church), containing prayers and hymns in German for the church services and private contemplation. Franz Seraph von Kohlbrenner was the editor for the texts, Norbert Hauner for the musical part. The book offers no names of authors. It is assumed that Kohlbrenner and Hauner are the authors of all new songs in the hymnal.

The hymn is part of regional sections of the Catholic hymnal Gotteslob, with various variants in text and melody. The Diocese of Münster has it as GL 778 and recommends its use for Easter and Ascension. It has been called "a typical hit among hymns".("Das ist so ein typischer Gassenhauer unter den Kirchenliedern.")

== Text ==
"Das Grab ist leer, der Held erwacht" is a new poetry in the spirit of Klopstocks. The original text had five stanzas of eight lines each, reflecting the resurrection of Jesus, closing each stanza with a threefold Alleluia. Of these stanzas, only the first is still common, but was expanded by two stanzas, first found in an 1866 hymnal from the Diocese of Münster. The hymnal Sursum Corda of 1874 for the Diocese of Paderborn presented these stanzas with a variant of the melody. They appear in the Gotteslob for the Diocese of Hamburg as GL 771 as follows:

1. Das Grab ist leer, der Held erwacht,
der Heiland ist erstanden!
Da sieht man seiner Gottheit Macht,
sie macht den Tod zuschanden.
Ihm kann kein Siegel, Grab, noch Stein,
kein Felsen widerstehn;
schließt ihn der Unglaub selber ein,
er wird ihn siegreich sehn.
Halleluja!

2. Wo ist dein Sieg, o bittrer Tod?
Du selber musst erbeben;
der mit dir rang, ist unser Gott,
Herr über Tod und Leben.
Verbürgt ist nun die Göttlichkeit
von Jesu Werk und Wort,
und Jesus ist im letzten Streit
für uns ein sichrer Hort.
Halleluja!

3. Dir danken nun, Herr Jesus Christ,
die Völker aller Zungen,
dass du vom Tod erstanden bist,
das Heil uns hast errungen.
Herr, bleib bei uns, wenn’s Abend wird,
dass wir nicht irregehn!
So wird die Herde wie der Hirt
einst glorreich auferstehn.
Halleluja!

== Melody ==
The melody begins with a fanfare, using a fourth up. The interval also begins all other uneven lines. Regional melodies differ in repeats and time signature. While the original melody was in triple meter, the hymnal Sursum Corda had a version in common time. The Gotteslob of Diocese of Limburg has it (in two stanzas) in common time as GL 779.

== Bibliography ==
- Westermayer, Georg (1882). "Kohlbrenner, Franz Seraph" . Allgemeine Deutsche Biographie (in German). Vol. 16. Leipzig: Duncker & Humblot. pp. 431–432.
