= Benedictus (canticle) =

Canticle from the Gospel of Luke

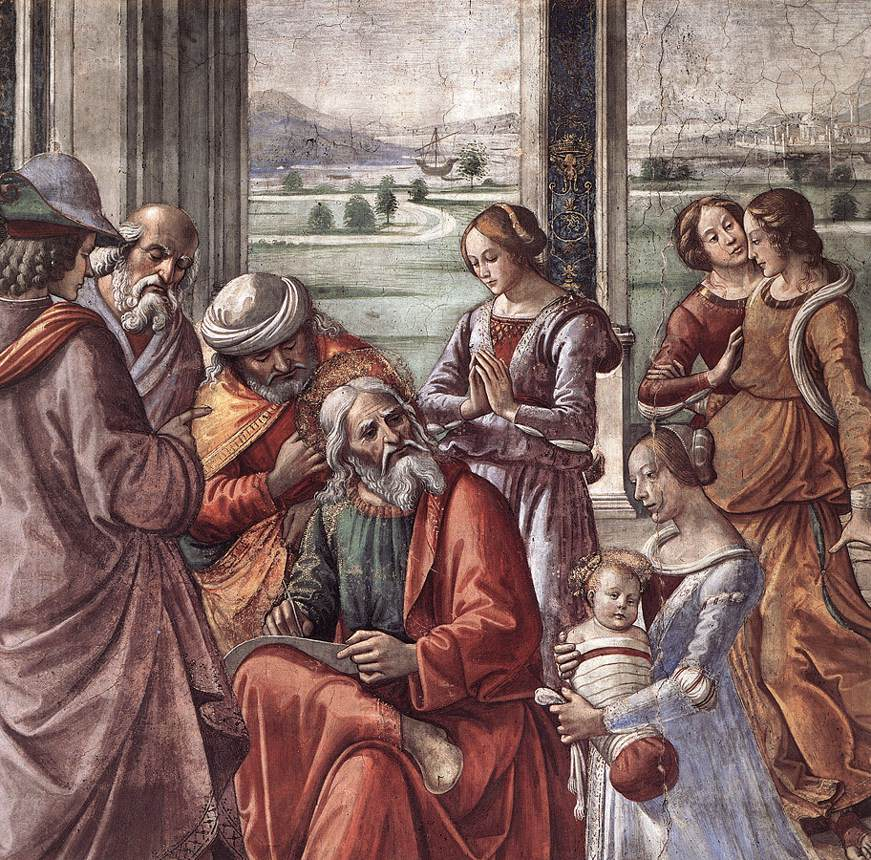
Detail of Zechariah writing down the name of his son (Domenico Ghirlandaio, 15th century, Tornabuoni Chapel, Italy).

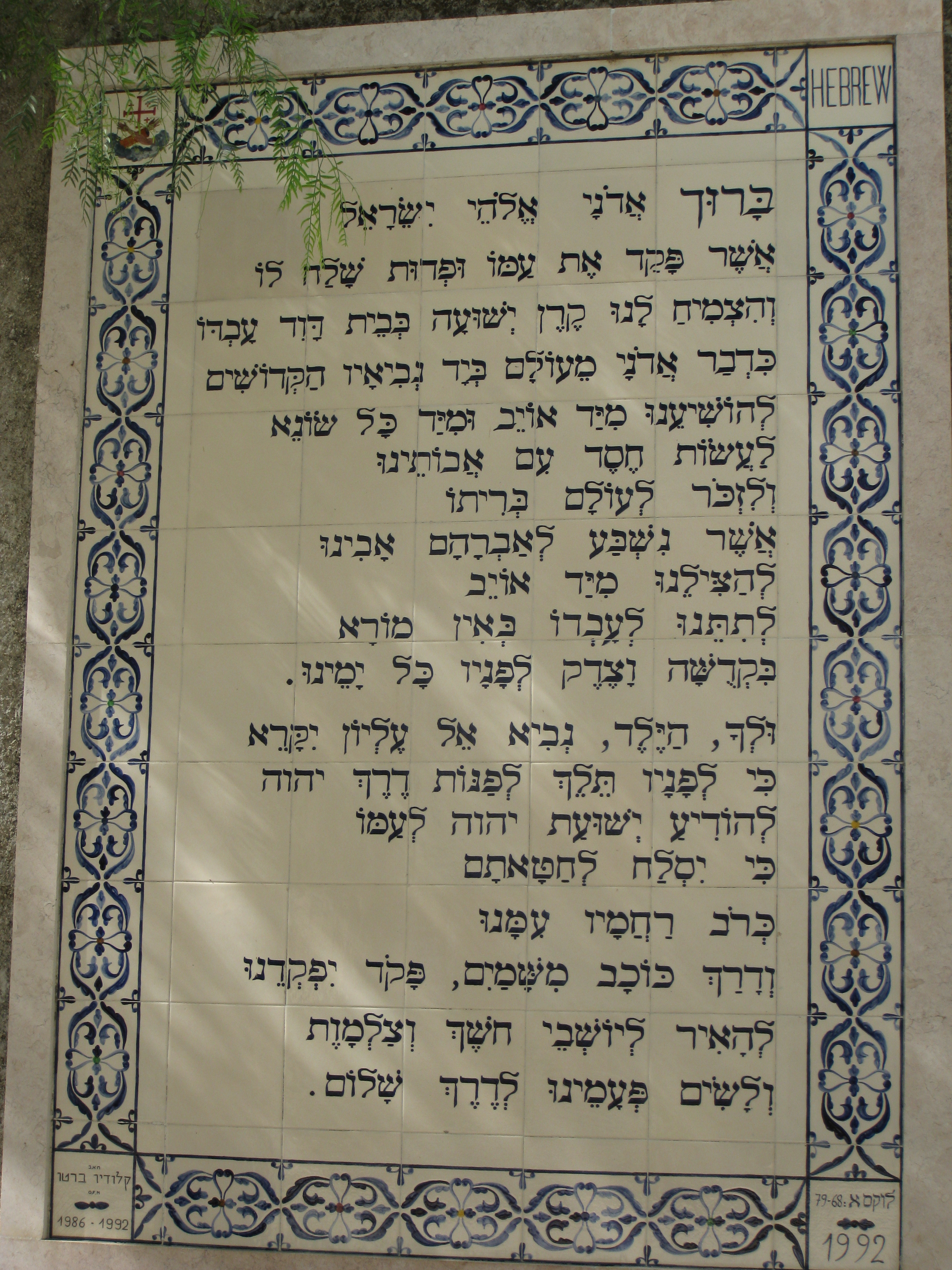
At the church of St. John in the Mountains - the birthplace of St. John

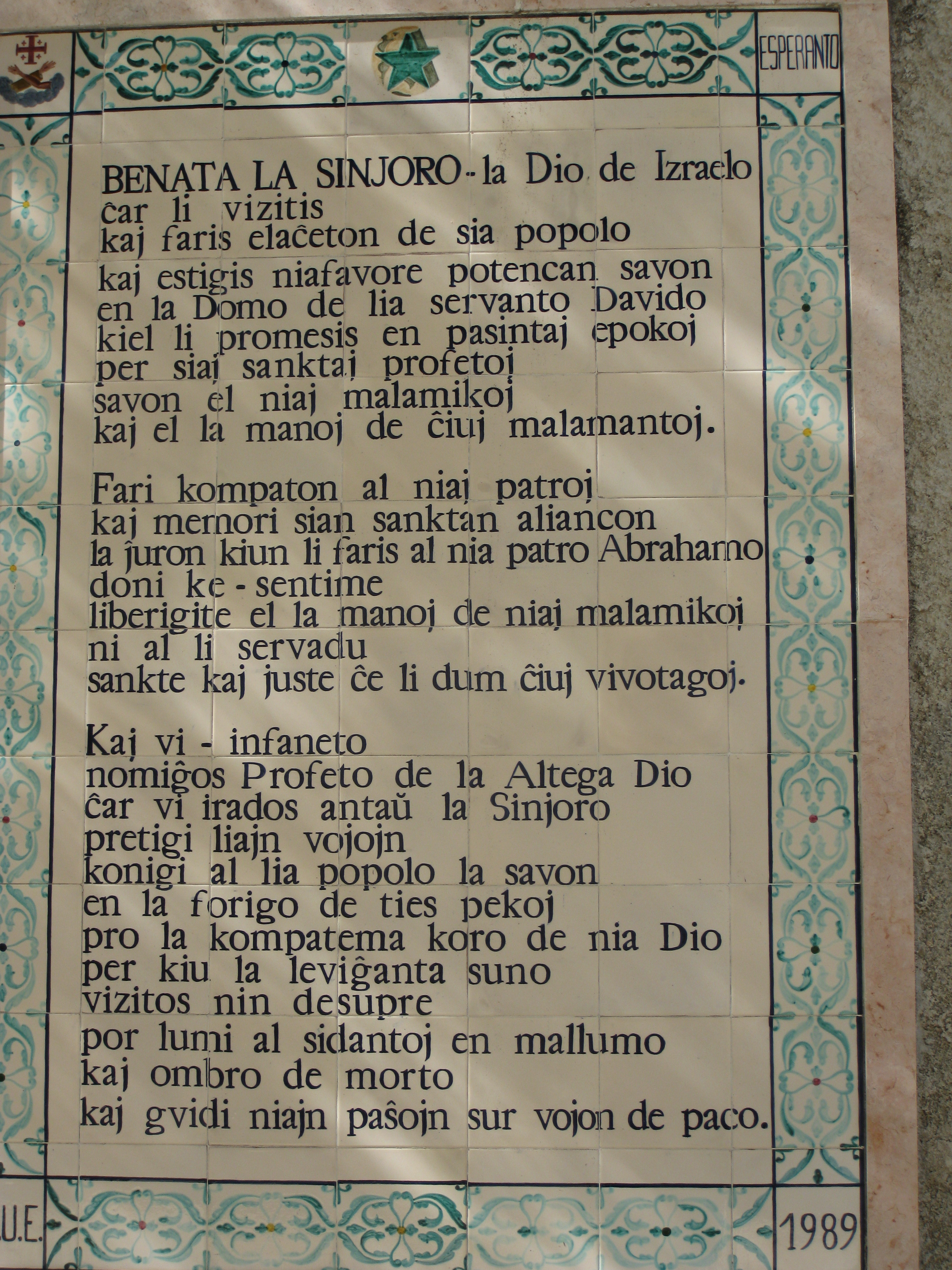

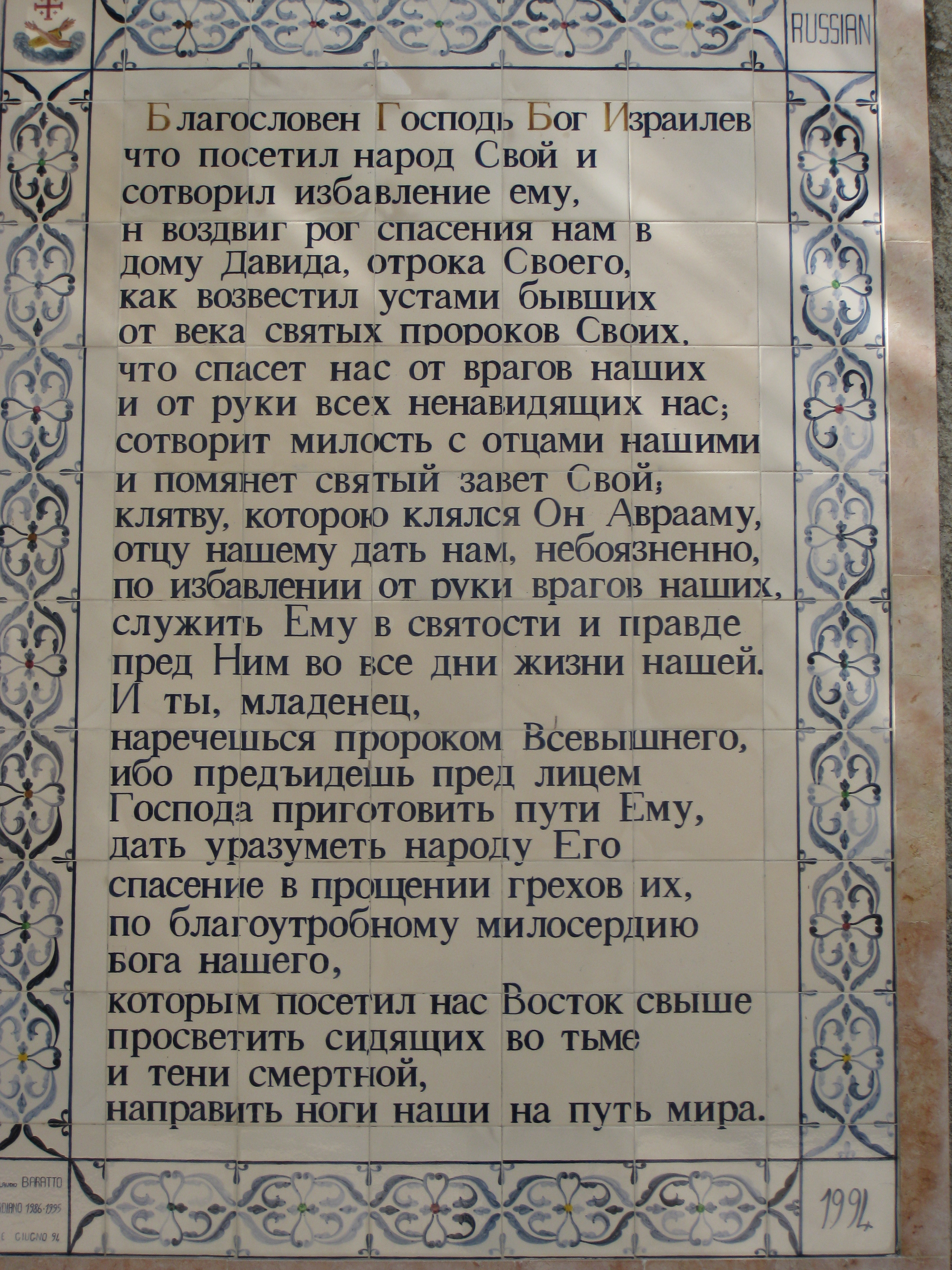

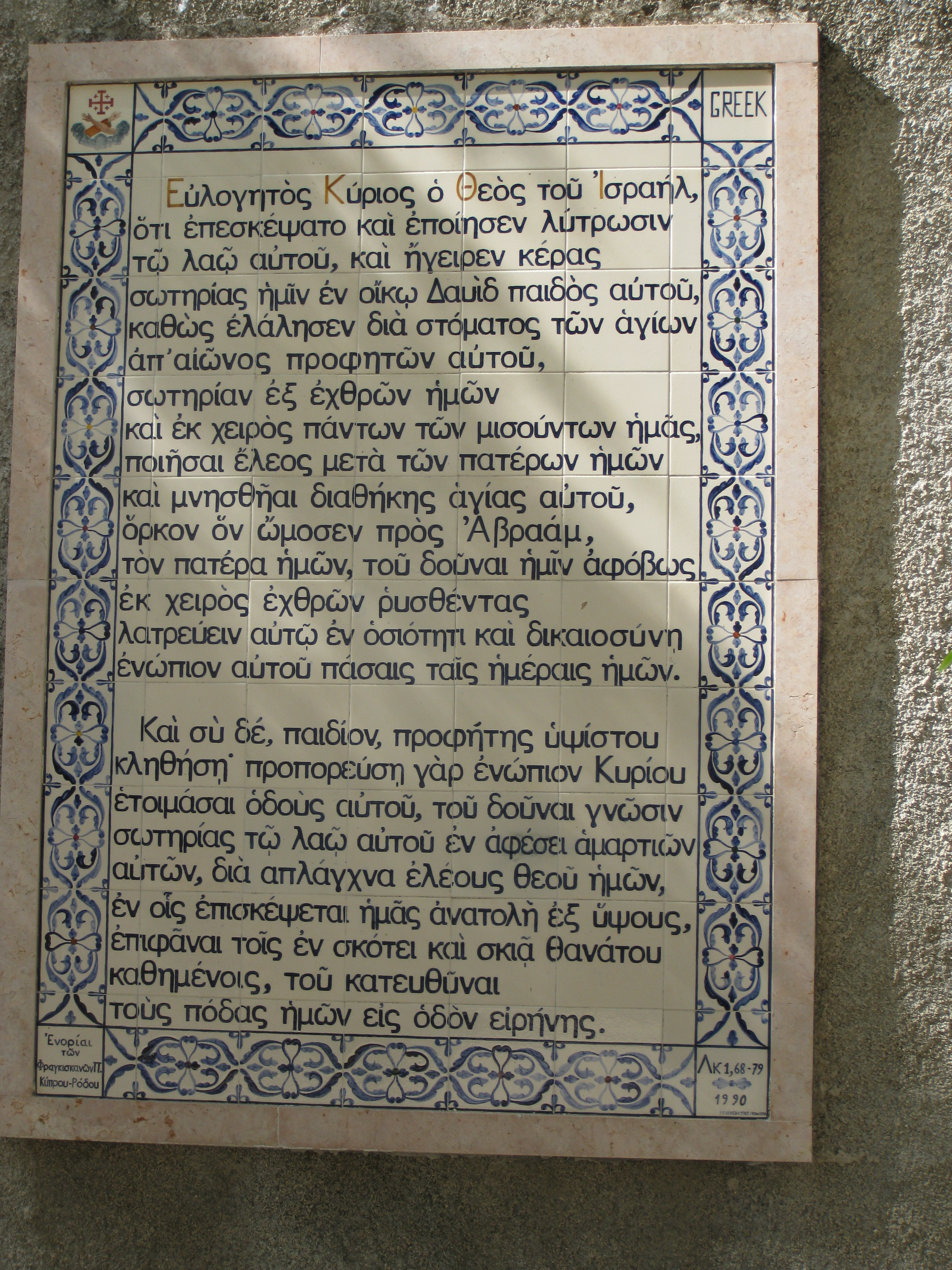

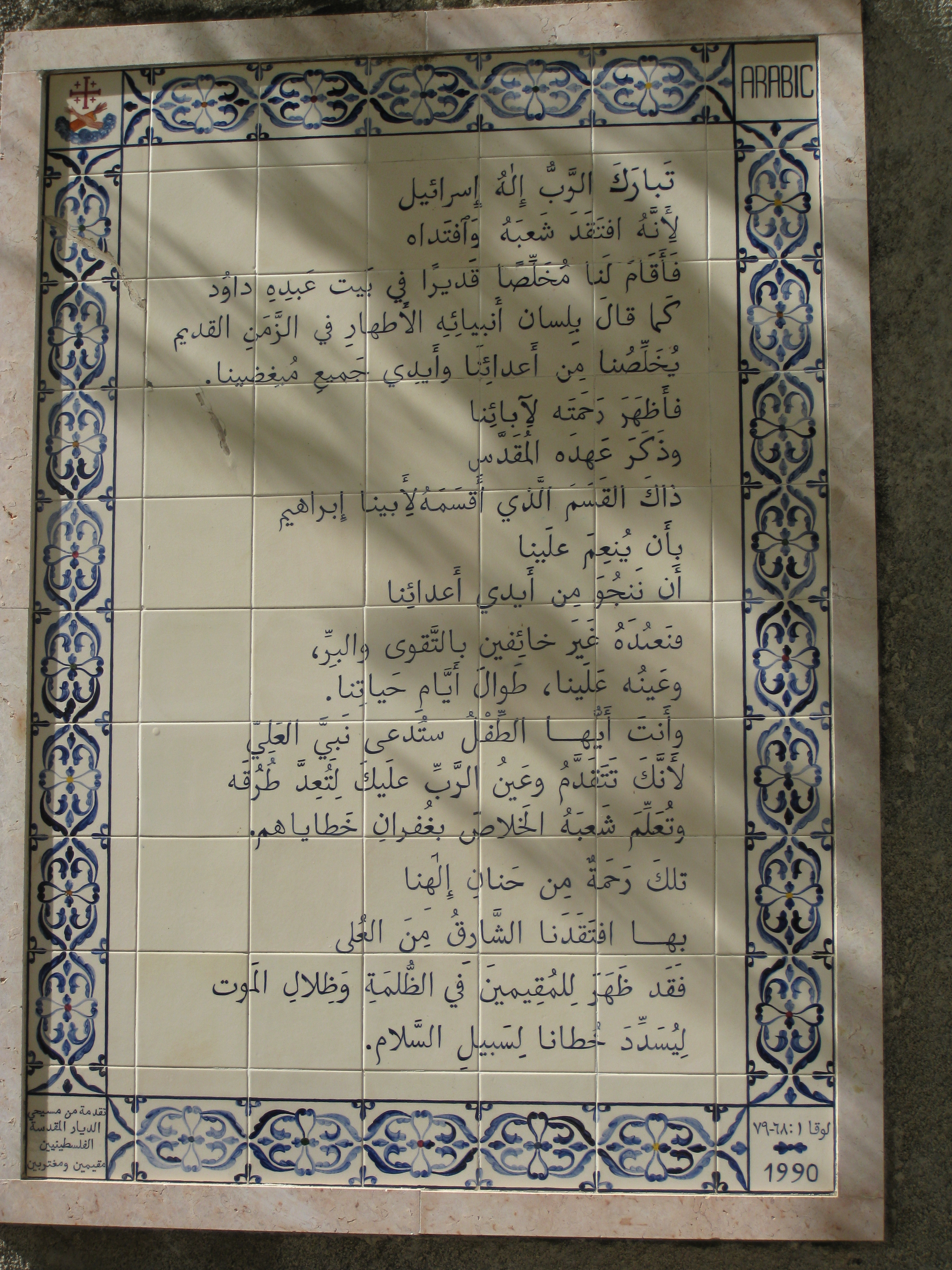

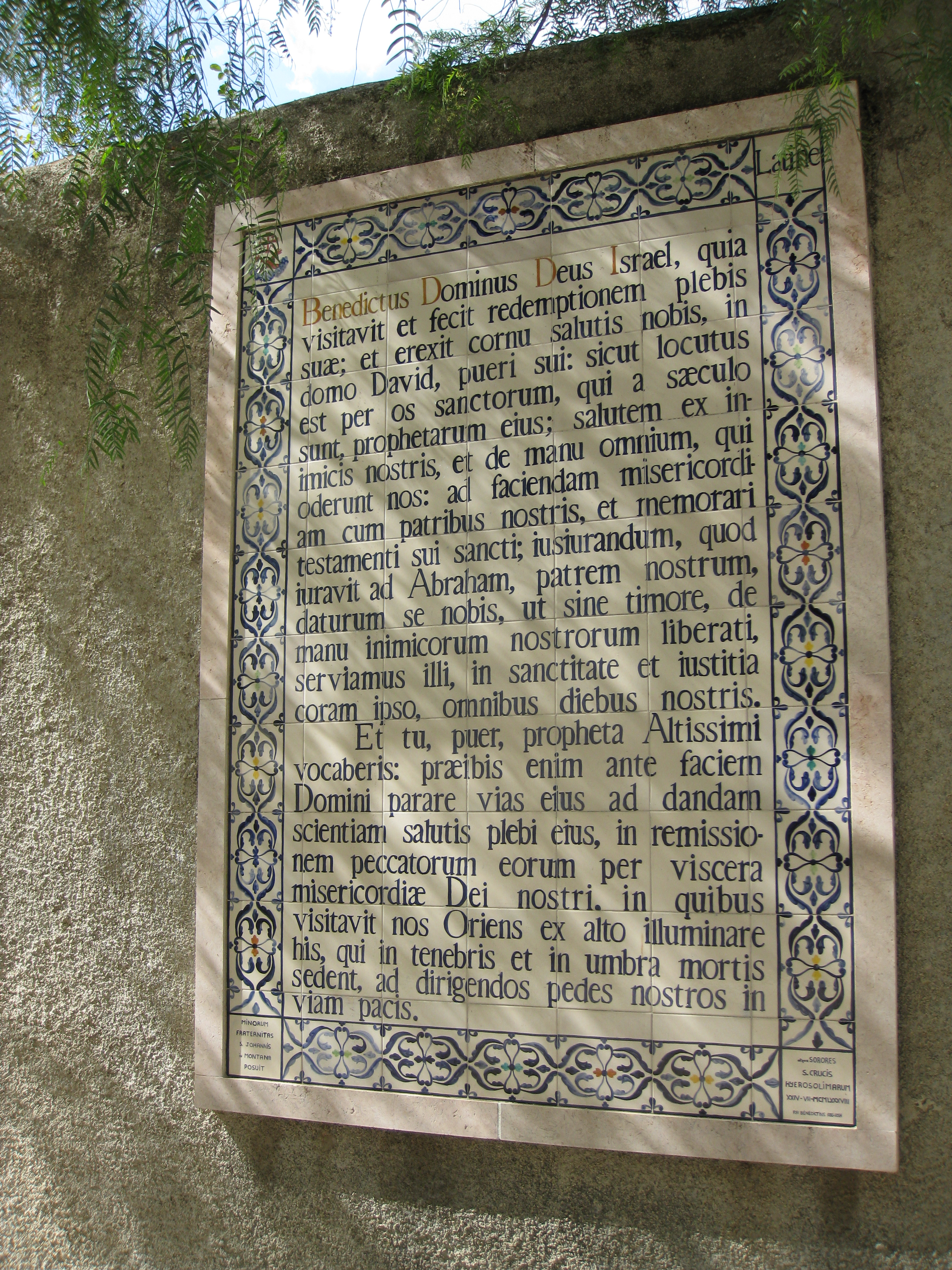

The Benedictus (also Song of Zechariah or Canticle of Zachary), given in Gospel of Luke 1:68–79, is one of the three canticles in the first two chapters of this Gospel, the other two being the "Magnificat" and the "Nunc dimittis". The Benedictus was the song of thanksgiving uttered by Zechariah on the occasion of the circumcision of his son, John the Baptist.

The canticle received its name from its first words in Latin ("Benedictus Dominus Deus Israel", “Blessed be the Lord God of Israel”). Along with the Magnificat, as well as several Old Testament canticles, the Benedictus is included in the Book of Odes, an ancient liturgical collection found in some manuscripts of the Septuagint.

== Structure ==
The whole canticle naturally falls into two parts. The first (verses 68–75) is a song of thanksgiving for the realization of the Messianic hopes of the Jewish nation; but to such realization is given a characteristically Christian tone. As of old, in the family of David, there was power to defend the nation against their enemies, now again that of which they had been so long deprived, and for which they had been yearning, was to be restored to them, but in a higher and spiritual sense. The horn is a sign of power, and the "horn of salvation" signified the power of delivering or "a mighty deliverance". While the Jews had impatiently borne the yoke of the Romans, they had continually sighed for the time when the House of David was to be their deliverer. The deliverance was now at hand, and was pointed to by Zechariah as the fulfilment of God's oath to Abraham; but the fulfilment is described as a deliverance not for the sake of worldly power, but that "we may serve him without fear, in holiness and justice all our days".

The second part of the canticle is an address by Zechariah to his own son, who was to take so important a part in the scheme of the Redemption; for he was to be a prophet, and to preach the remission of sins before the coming of the Redeemer from on high. The prophecy that he was to "go before the face of the Lord to prepare his ways" (v. 76) was of course an allusion to the well-known words of Isaiah 40:3 which John himself afterwards applied to his own mission (John 1:23), and which all three Synoptic Gospels adopt (Matthew 3:3; Mark 1:2; Luke 3:4).

== Use in worship ==
The Pulpit Commentary refers to a belief that the Benedictus was "first introduced into the public worship of the Church about the middle of the sixth century by St. Caesarius of Arles".

In the Roman Catholic Church, the Benedictus is part of Lauds, probably because of the song of thanksgiving for the coming of the Redeemer in the first part of the canticle. It is believed to have been first introduced by Benedict of Nursia. According to Durandus, the allusion to Christ's coming under the figure of the rising sun had also some influence on its adoption. It also features in various other liturgical offices, notably at a funeral, at the moment of interment, when words of thanksgiving for the Redemption are specially in place as an expression of Christian hope.

It is one of the canticles in the Anglican service of Morning Prayer (or Matins) according to the Book of Common Prayer, where it is sung or said after the second (New Testament) lesson, unless Psalm 100 ("Jubilate Deo") is used instead. It may also be used as a canticle in the Lutheran service of Matins.

== Texts ==
=== Greek ===
The Greek version of the canticle appears in the Gospel of Luke 1:68-79:

Εὐλογητὸς κύριος ὁ θεὸς τοῦ Ἰσραήλ,

ὁτι ἐπεσκέψατο καὶ ἐποίησεν λύτρωσιν τῷ λαῷ αὐτοῦ,

καὶ ἠγειρεν κέρας σωτηρίας ἡμῖν

ἐν οἴκῳ Δαυὶδ παιδὸς αὐτοῦ,

καθὼς ἐλάλησεν διὰ στόματος τῶν ἀγίων ἀπ' αἰῶνος προφητῶν αὐτοῦ,

σωτηρίαν ἐξ ἐχθρῶν ἡμῶν καὶ ἐκ χειρὸς πάντων τῶν μισούντων ἡμᾶς·

ποιῆσαι ἔλεος μετὰ τῶν πατέρων ἡμῶν

καὶ μνησθῆναι διαθήκης ἀγίας αὐτοῦ,

ὅρκον ὃν ὤμοσεν πρὸς Ἀβραὰμ τὸν πατέρα ἡμῶν,

τοῦ δοῦναι ἡμῖν

ἀφόβως ἐκ χειρὸς ἐχθρῶν ῥυσθέντας

λατρεύειν αὐτῷ ἐν ὁσιότητι

καὶ δικαιοσύνῃ ἐνώπιον αὐτοῦ πάσαις ταῖς ἡμέραις ἡμῶν.

Καὶ σὺ δέ, παιδίον, προφήτης ὑψίστου κληθήσῃ,

προπορεύσῃ γὰρ ἐνώπιον κυρίου ἑτοιμάσαι ὁδοὺς αὐτοῦ,

τοῦ δοῦναι γνῶσιν σωτηρίας τῷ λαῷ αὐτοῦ

ἐν ἀφέσει ἀμαρτιῶν αὐτῶν,

διὰ σπλάγχνα ἐλέους θεοῦ ἡμῶν,

ἐν οἷς ἐπισκέψεται ἡμᾶς ἀνατολὴ ἐξ ὑψους,

ἐπιφᾶναι τοῖς ἐν σκότει καὶ σκιᾷ θανάτου καθημένοις,

τοῦ κατευθῦναι τοὺς πόδας ἡμῶν εἰς ὁδὸν εἰρήνης.

=== Latin ===
Benedictus Dominus Deus Israel; quia visitavit et fecit redemptionem plebis suae
et erexit cornu salutis nobis, in domo David pueri sui,
sicut locutus est per os sanctorum, qui a saeculo sunt, prophetarum eius,
salutem ex inimicis nostris, et de manu omnium, qui oderunt nos;
ad faciendam misericordiam cum patribus nostris, et memorari testamenti sui sancti,
iusiurandum, quod iuravit ad Abraham patrem nostrum, daturum se nobis,
ut sine timore, de manu inimicorum nostrorum liberati, serviamus illi
in sanctitate et iustitia coram ipso omnibus diebus nostris.
Et tu, puer, propheta Altissimi vocaberis: praeibis enim ante faciem Domini parare vias eius,
ad dandam scientiam salutis plebi eius in remissionem peccatorum eorum,
per viscera misericordiae Dei nostri, in quibus visitabit nos oriens ex alto,
illuminare his, qui in tenebris et in umbra mortis sedent, ad dirigendos pedes nostros in viam pacis.

=== English ===
==== International Commission on English in the Liturgy ====
Blessed be the Lord, the God of Israel;
he has come to his people and set them free.
He has raised up for us a mighty savior,
born of the house of his servant David.

Through his holy prophets he promised of old
that he would save us from our enemies,
from the hands of all who hate us.
He promised to show mercy to our fathers
and to remember his holy covenant.

This was the oath he swore to our father Abraham:
to set us free from the hands of our enemies,
free to worship him without fear,
holy and righteous in his sight all the days of our life.

You, my child, shall be called the prophet of the Most High;
for you will go before the Lord to prepare his way,
to give his people knowledge of salvation
by the forgiveness of their sins.

In the tender compassion of our God
the dawn from on high shall break upon us,
to shine on those who dwell in darkness and the shadow of death,
and to guide our feet into the way of peace.

==== The United Methodist Hymnal ====
Blessed be the Lord, the God of Israel,

who has come to set the chosen people free.

The Lord has raised up for us

a mighty Savior from the house of David.

Through the holy prophets, God promised of old

to save us from our enemies,
from the hands of all who hate us;

to show mercy to our forebears

and to remember the holy covenant.

This was the oath God swore to our father Abraham
to set us free from the hands of our enemies,

free to worship without fear,
holy and righteous in the Lord's sight,
all the days of our life. R

and you, child, shall be called the prophet of the Most High,

for you will go before the Lord to prepare the way,

to give God's people knowledge of salvation

by the forgiveness of their sins.

In the tender compassion of our God

the dawn from on high shall break upon us,

to shine on those who dwell in the darkness and the shadow of death,

and to guide our feet into the way of peace. R

==== New American Bible ====
Blessed be the Lord, the God of Israel,

for he has visited and brought redemption to his people.

He has raised up a horn for our salvation

within the house of David his servant,

even as he promised through the mouth of his holy prophets from of old:

salvation from our enemies and from the hand of all who hate us,

to show mercy to our fathers

and to be mindful of his holy covenant

and of the oath he swore to Abraham our father,
and to grant us that, rescued from the hand of enemies,
without fear we might worship him in holiness and righteousness

before him all our days.

And you, child, will be called prophet of the Most High,

for you will go before the Lord to prepare his ways,

to give his people knowledge of salvation

through the forgiveness of their sins,

because of the tender mercy of our God

by which the daybreak from on high will visit us

to shine on those who sit in darkness and death’s shadow,

to guide our feet into the path of peace.

==== Douay–Rheims ====
From the Douay–Rheims Bible (Challoner Revision):

Blessed be the Lord God of Israel; because he hath visited and wrought the redemption of His people:

And hath raised up an horn of salvation to us, in the house of David his servant:
As he spoke by the mouth of his holy prophets, who are from the beginning:
Salvation from our enemies, and from the hand of all that hate us:
To perform mercy to our fathers, and to remember his holy testament,
The oath, which he swore to Abraham our father, that he would grant to us,
That being delivered from the hand of our enemies, we may serve him without fear,
In holiness and justice before him, all our days.
And thou, child, shalt be called the prophet of the Highest: for thou shalt go before the face of the Lord to prepare his ways:
To give knowledge of salvation to his people, unto the remission of their sins:
Through the bowels of the mercy of our God, in which the Orient from on high hath visited us:
To enlighten them that sit in darkness, and in the shadow of death: to direct our feet into the way of peace.

==== Book of Common Prayer ====
From the 1662 Book of Common Prayer:

Blessed be the Lord God of Israel : for he hath visited, and redeemed his people;

And hath raised up a mighty salvation for us : in the house of his servant David;
As he spake by the mouth of his holy Prophets : which have been since the world began;
That we should be saved from our enemies : and from the hands of all that hate us;
To perform the mercy promised to our forefathers : and to remember his holy Covenant;
To perform the oath which he sware to our forefather Abraham : that he would give us;
That we being delivered out of the hands of our enemies : might serve him without fear;
In holiness and righteousness before him : all the days of our life.
And thou, Child, shalt be called the Prophet of the Highest : for thou shalt go before the face of the Lord to prepare his ways;
To give knowledge of salvation unto his people : for the remission of their sins,
Through the tender mercy of our God : whereby the day-spring from on high hath visited us;
To give light to them that sit in darkness, and in the shadow of death : and to guide our feet into the way of peace.

== See also ==
- Dead Sea Scrolls 4Q521
- Dawning Light of Our Salvation
