= Singet fröhlich im Advent =

- Advent song by Gottfried Neubert
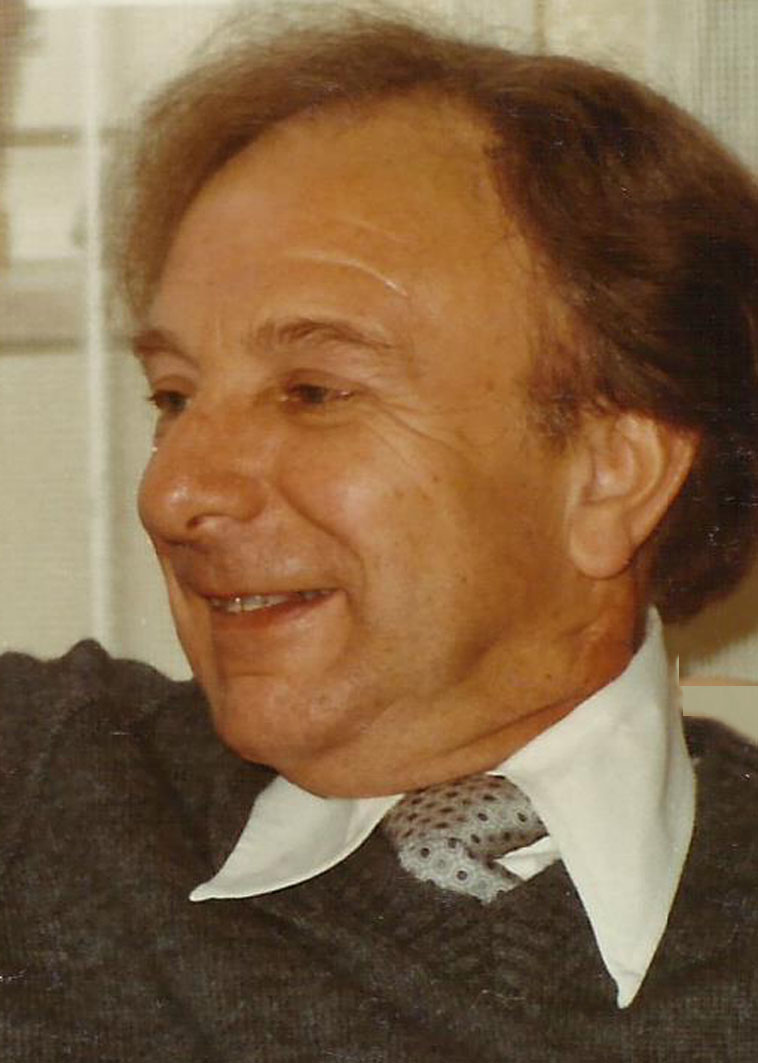
- Neubert in 2016
- English: Sing merrily in Advent
- Occasion: Advent
- Written: 1977
- Text: by Gottfried Neubert
- Language: German
- Based on: Isaiah 35:1–10

"Singet fröhlich im Advent" (Sing merrily in Advent) is an Advent song with German text and melody by Gottfried Neubert written in 1977. The song is part of the German Protestant hymnal Evangelisches Gesangbuch.

== History ==
Gottfried Neubert wrote the text and melody of "Singet fröhlich im Advent" in 1977. It was first published by Strube Verlag in 1977. In the Protestant hymnal Evangelisches Gesangbuch, it is EG 536. It is part of several songbooks.

== Theme and music ==
The song is based on the call of the prophet Isaiah to prepare the way for the Lord (Isaiah 40:3), quoted in the Gospel of Luke 3:4, referring to John the Baptist. The song consists of five stanzas of four lines each. The first stanza calls to sing merrily in Advent and let go of mourning. Stanzas two to four call more precisely to sing of hope, peace and love. The final stanza repeats the first call, adding thanks.
