= Wir sagen euch an den lieben Advent =

- Advent song
- English: We announce the dear Advent to you
- Occasion: Advent
- Written: 1954
- Text: by Maria Ferschl
- Language: German
- Melody: by Heinrich Rohr
- Composed: 1954

"Wir sagen euch an den lieben Advent" (We announce the dear Advent to you) is an Advent song with German text by Maria Ferschl written in 1954, and a melody by Heinrich Rohr. The song is part of the German Protestant hymnal Evangelisches Gesangbuch, the Catholic Gotteslob and many songbooks. It is suitable for children.

== History ==
Maria Ferschl, an Austrian teacher who worked for the reform of Catholic liturgy, wrote the text of "Wir sagen euch an den lieben Advent" in Riedhausen in 1954. She based it on the order of service at the time, with relation of the four stanzas to the prescribed biblical readings on the four Sundays in Advent. The melody was composed the same year by Heinrich Rohr, Kirchenmusikdirektor in Mainz. It was first sung on Christmas Eve 1954 in the St. Michael church of Riedhausen.

The song was first published by Verlag Herder in 1954. In the Protestant hymnal Evangelisches Gesangbuch, it is EG 17. It was part of the Catholic Gotteslob of 1975 as GL 115, retained in the second edition as GL 223. It is featured in many songbooks, including some for children.

== Text and music ==
The song is in four stanzas of six lines each, with verses of four lines and a refrain. All stanzas begin with the same announcement in two lines, saying which candle of an Advent wreath is burning. Lines 3 and 4 are related to the biblical reading. The refrain calls to be joyful because the Lord is near.

The melody is in F major in a triple meter. It has a small range of only six notes, a simple rhythm and harmonies changing only between F major and C major, making it suitable for children. The melody of the first two lines is repeated for the next two lines.

The song was intended with the verses sung by a small schola and the refrain with the congregation joining. The candles of an Advent wreath can be lighted simultaneously.
