= Mit Ernst, o Menschenkinder =

Advent hymn by Valentin Thilo

- Advent hymn
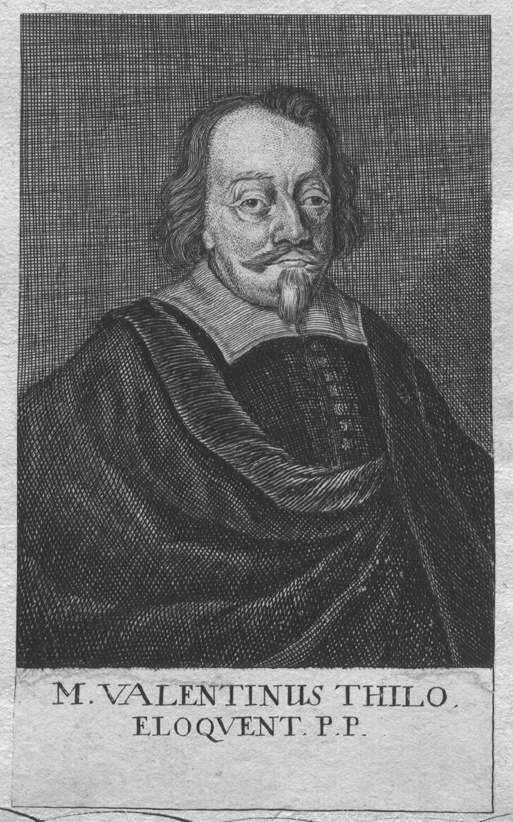
- Valentin Thilo
- Text: by Valentin Thilo
- Language: German
- Composed: 1557
- Published: 1642
- Melody

"Mit Ernst, o Menschenkinder" (literally: With seriousness, you Children of Man) is an Advent hymn by Valentin Thilo. It partly paraphrases the call to penitence by John the Baptist. The text was first published in 1642 in the collection Preußische Festlieder. The different melody that later became popular dates back to 1557. Catherine Winkworth translated it as "Ye sons of men, in earnest".

== History ==
"Mit Ernst, o Menschenkinder" is one of the hymns by Valentin Thilo, a member of the Königsberger Dichterkreis (Königsberg poets' circle). His text was first published by Johann Stobäus in the 1642 collection Preußische Festlieder (Prussian festive songs), with an art song melody by Stobäus. In East Prussia, the song was also sung with a melody by Johannes Eccard. The melody in modern hymnals goes back to the French song "Une jeune Pucelle" that appeared in Lyon in 1557. It was first used for a hymn by Ludwig Helmbold in 1563, associated with "Von Gott will ich nicht lassen".

The hymn is part of the common Protestant hymnal Evangelisches Gesangbuch as EG 10. The common Catholic hymnal Gotteslob included the song in the first 1975 edition as GL 113 in three stanzas, omitting the third, and in a slightly modified version. In the 2013 edition, it appears no longer in the Stammteil (root part), but in regional sections. In the Diocese of Stuttgart, GL 752 has all four stanzas, in the modified version. In the Diocese of Limburg, GL 748 is copied from the 1975 version. It is also part of other hymnals and song books.

Max Reger set a SATB choral arrangement of the hymn as No. 1 in his 1901 collection of forty easy-to-execute sacred songs, WoO VI/17, and as No. 42 under the title "Von Gott will ich nicht lassen (Mit Ernst, o Menschenkinder)" in volume 3 of his 1902 collection 52 chorale preludes, Op. 67.

== Text ==
Thilo wrote four stanzas of four lines each. His fourth stanza clarifies that he partly paraphrases Biblical words by John the Baptist, according to Matthew 3:3–4, who again quotes Isaiah 40:3–4, calling to turn in penitence and prepare a way for the Lord.

4. Das war Johannis Stimme, das war Johannis Lehr;
Gott strafet den mit Grimme, der ihm nicht gibt Gehör.
O Herr Gott, mach auch mich zu deines Kindes Krippen,
so sollen meine Lippen mit Ruhm erheben dich.

'Twas thus St. John hath taught us, 'twas thus he preacb'd of yore;
And they will feel God's anger who list not to his lore.
Ah God! now let his voice to Thy true service win us,
That Christ may come within us, and we in Him rejoice!

However, this fourth stanza was replaced in the 1657 edition of the Hannoversches Gesangbuch (Hanover hymnal) by a different stanza, a prayer for the right attitude of repentance, looking at the stable and the manger of the nativity.

The text in modern Protestant hymnals is:

1. Mit Ernst, o Menschenkinder, das Herz in euch bestellt,
bald wird das Heil der Sünder, der wunderstarke Held,
den Gott aus Gnad allein der Welt zum Licht und Leben
versprochen hat zu geben, bei allen kehren ein.

2. Bereitet doch fein tüchtig den Weg dem großen Gast;
macht seine Steige richtig, lasst alles, was er hasst;
macht alle Bahnen recht, die Tal lasst sein erhöhet,
macht niedrig, was hoch stehet, was krumm ist, gleich und schlicht.

3. Ein Herz, das Demut liebet, bei Gott am höchsten steht;
ein Herz, das Hochmut übet, mit Angst zugrunde geht;
ein Herz, das richtig ist und folget Gottes Leiten,
das kann sich recht bereiten, zu dem kommt Jesus Christ.

4. Ach mache du mich Armen zu dieser heilgen Zeit
aus Güte und Erbarmen, Herr Jesu, selbst bereit.
Zieh in mein Herz hinein vom Stall und von der Krippen,
so werden Herz und Lippen dir allzeit dankbar sein.

Ye sons of men, in earnest prepare your hearts within,
The wondrous Conqu'ror cometh, whose power can save from sin,
Whom God in grace alone hath promised long to send us,
To lighten and befriend us, and make His mercy known.

Oh set your ways in order when such a guest is nigh;
Make plain the paths before Him that now deserted lie.
Forsake what He doth hate, exalt the lowly valleys,
Bring down all pride and malice, and make the crooked straight.

The heart that's meek and lowly is highest with our God;
The heart now proud and lofty He humbles with His rod;
The heart that's unenticed by sin, and fears to grieve Him,
Is ready to receive Him, to such comes Jesus Christ.

The third stanza, pointing out that a "humble" heart is closer to God than a "proud" heart, has been compared to text from the Magnificat, Mary's song of praise.

== Melody ==
Source
