= Dawning Light of Our Salvation =

- by Bruce Benedict
- Genre: Hymn
- Occasion: Advent
- Written: 2012
- Text: by Wendell Kimbrough
- Language: English
- Based on: Isaiah 9:2, Isaiah 40:4, Luke 1:68
- Meter: 8.7.8.7.D
- Melody: Dawning Light
- Composed: 2012

"Dawning Light of Our Salvation" is a Christian hymn for the season of Advent. It was written in 2012, with lyrics by Wendell Kimbrough and a contemporary folk tune composed by Bruce Benedict. The hymn is based primarily on the Benedictus in Luke 1:68–79, and its three verses sequentially describe the wandering of God's people in sin, the hopeful promise of a coming Messiah, and the identification of Jesus as the Messiah along with delight in the salvation he brings. The hymn was first recorded in 2013 and has been published in two hymnals. It is commonly sung during Advent and Christmas but has been recommended for Easter services as well.

== Background ==
Anglican singer-songwriter Wendell Kimbrough wrote the text of the hymn in 2012 for the Canticles album produced by Cardiphonia. He invited composer Bruce Benedict, chaplain at Hope College, to write the music. The text is set in 8.7.8.7.D. meter.

== Text ==
The text is based on the Benedictus, also known as the song of Zechariah in Luke 1:68–79. The first verse describes Israel's long wanderings in darkness and bondage to sin. The second verse evokes the promise of a savior to be born of the lineage of David. The third verse names Jesus as the coming and promised Messiah of God's people and alludes to Isaiah 35:5–6 ("Then the eyes of the blind shall be opened, and the ears of the deaf shall be unstopped. Then shall the lame man leap as an hart, and the tongue of the dumb sing...." KJV) to describe the response of all creation to Jesus' coming.

The chorus draws from Isaiah 40:4's messianic prophecy. ("Every valley shall be exalted, and every mountain and hill shall be made low: and the crooked shall be made straight, and the rough places plain." KJV).

== Music ==
The hymn has been described as being in the contemporary folk genre.

== Publication history and reception ==
Recordings of "Dawning Light of Our Salvation" were released on Cardiphonia's Canticles album in 2013 and Kimbrough's Hymns and Friends album in 2014.

The hymn has been published in Christian Worship (2021), the hymnal of the Wisconsin Evangelical Lutheran Synod, and Hymns and Devotions for Daily Worship (2024).

"Dawning Light of Our Salvation" is customarily recommended as a selection for Advent and Christmas, including Lessons and Carols services. It has also been commended for use in Easter Vigil services.
