= Franz Seraph von Kohlbrenner =

German polymath (1728–1783)

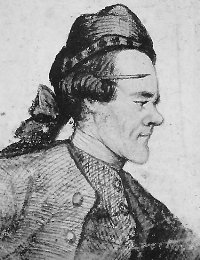
- Contemporary drawing
- Born: Johann Franz Seraph Kohlbrenner; 17 October 1728; Traunstein, Bavaria
- Died: 6 June 1783 (aged 54); Munich
- Occupations: Civil servant; Writer; Publisher; Hymnwriter
- Awards: Reichsritter

Johann Franz Seraph von Kohlbrenner (17 October 1728 – 6 June 1783) was a German polymath, promoting the Enlightenment in Bavaria. While working as a civil servant for the Bavarian court, he published a hymnal which contained a complete German High Mass and songs such as "Das Grab ist leer, der Held erwacht" (The grave is empty, the hero awoken) for which he is known. These hymns and especially his German mass, used in settings by Michael Haydn, remain popular to this day.

== Career ==
Beginning life as Johann Franz Seraph Kohlbrenner in Traunstein on 17 October 1728, he was the son of Rupert Kohlbrenner, a worker in a salt works. After attending the local Volksschule, he worked as a clerk at the salt works, responsible for the company's archives.

At age 25, Kohlbrenner was called to Munich to revise and supervise the Registry of the Exchequer (Registratur der Hofkammer). In 1762, he installed a tree garden in the elector's Aerarium in Lechhausen. From 1766, he published a journal of the Intelligenzblatt type, the Intelligenzblatt der Churbaierischen Lande.

In 1777, together with the priest and composer Norbert Hauner, Kohlbrenner published in Landshut the first part of a Roman Catholic hymnal, Der heilige Gesang zum Gottesdienste in der römisch-katholischen Kirche, which promoted liturgical singing in German, in the spirit of the Enlightenment. After this hymnal was also published in Salzburg in 1781, he added a second part, published there in 1783. Part of the hymnal was his Singmesse, for singing the complete mass ordinary in German instead of the traditional Latin. His German mass in ten songs was set to music by Michael Haydn several times, called Deutsches Hochamt (German High Mass).

On 26 June 1778 Charles Theodore, Elector of Bavaria, made Kohlbrenner a Reichsritter (Imperial Knight). Unmarried, he died at age 54 on 6 June 1783, in Munich and was buried at the cemetery of Unserer Lieben Frau Gottesaker zu St. Salvator. The inscription read:

He was a bourgeois writer, and active as a city-dweller; he stood out from his fellows by his rare boldness in business and his unsurpassed steadfastness in carrying out that to which he set his hand.

Franz Seraph von Kohlbrenner is still known for his German High Mass and for his hymn which appears in the regional section of the Catholic hymnal Gotteslob for Austria (2013 edition) as GL 710. "Das Grab ist leer, der Held erwacht" is frequently sung in Easter services. His hometown, Traunstein, has named a Mittelschule after him.

== Works ==
- Das baierische und pfälzische Landmann in der verbessernden Landwirthschaft. Munich 1769 (urn:nbn:de:bvb:12-bsb10375852-1)
- Geographische Mauth-Charte von Baiern. Augsburg 1764 (urn:nbn:de:bvb:12-bsb00002290-8)
- Der heilige Gesang zum Gottesdienste in der römisch-katholischen Kirche. Landshut 1777 (Digitalisat)
- Materialien für die Sittenlehre, Litteratur, Landwirthschaft, zur Kenntnis der Producte, und für die Geschichte alt und neuer Zeiten. München 1774.

== Literature ==
- Manfred Knedlik (2007). "KOHLBRENNER, Johann Franz Seraph von". In Bautz, Traugott (ed.). Biographisch-Bibliographisches Kirchenlexikon (BBKL) (in German). Vol. 27. Nordhausen: Bautz. cols. 766–770. ISBN 978-3-88309-393-2.
- Cornelia Baumann: "Wie wenig sind, die dieses wagen!" Franz von Kohlbrenner, Traunstein 1728 – München 1783. Drei-Linden-Verlag, Grabenstätt 1985.
- Cornelia Oelwein: Franz von Kohlbrenner (1728–1783). Ein berühmter Traunsteiner. Chiemgau Dr., Traunstein 1996.
- Daniel Schlögl: Der planvolle Staat. Raumerfassung und Reformen in Bayern 1750 – 1800. C.H. Beck, München 2002, ISBN 3-406-10719-2.
- Lorenz Westenrieder: Leben des Johann Franz Seraph von Kohlbrenner samt seinem Portrait. Strobl, München 1783 (urn:nbn:de:bvb:12-bsb10380807-1)
- anon.: Kohlbrenner, wie er war. oder Anmerkungen und Anekdoten zu dem von Hr. Prof. Westenrieder verfaßten Leben des Johann Franz Seraph Edlen von Kohlbrenner. 1793 (urn:nbn:de:bvb:12-bsb10380808-6)
- Westermayer, Georg (1882). "Kohlbrenner, Franz Seraph" . Allgemeine Deutsche Biographie (in German). Vol. 16. Leipzig: Duncker & Humblot. pp. 431–432.
- Clemens Alois Baader: Das gelehrte Baiern, oder Lexikon aller Schriftsteller, welche Baiern im 18. Jahrhundert erzeugte oder ernährte. Nürnberg 1804, Sp. 606–610 (Digitalisat, p. 208, at Google Books)
