= Vi tänder ett ljus i advent =

Swedish Advent song

- Hymn
- Occasion: Advent
- Text: by Stewe Gårdare
- Language: Swedish
- Melody: by Stewe Gårdare
- Published: 1997

Vi tänder ett ljus i advent is an Advent song, written by Stewe Gårdare.

== Recordings ==
An early recording was done by Voice on the 1984 album Jul i vårt hus.

== Publication ==
- Julens önskesångbok, 1997, under the lines "Advent".
- Number 810 in Psalmer och Sånger 2003 under the lines "Advent".
