= Deutsche Messe (Schubert) =

Composition by Franz Schubert

- by Franz Schubert
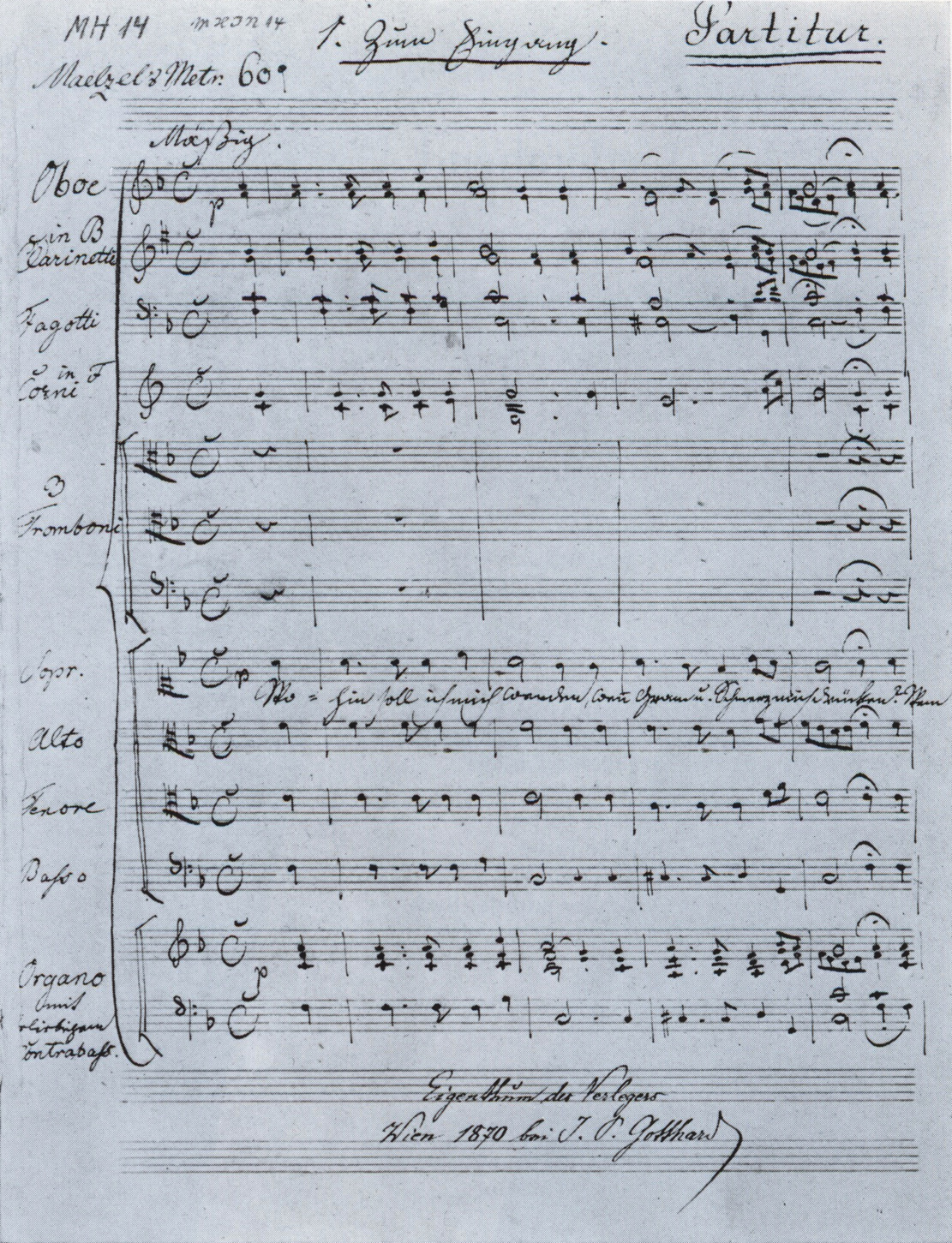
- Hand-written transcription, from 1870 (long after Schubert's death), of the first page of the movement "Zum Eingang" (Introit)
- English: German Mass
- Catalogue: D 872
- Year: 1827
- Form: Hymn cycle
- Text: Johann Philipp Neumann
- Language: German
- Movements: 8, with an appendix
- Vocal: STB soloists, SATB choir
- Instrumental: wind instruments, timpani and basso continuo

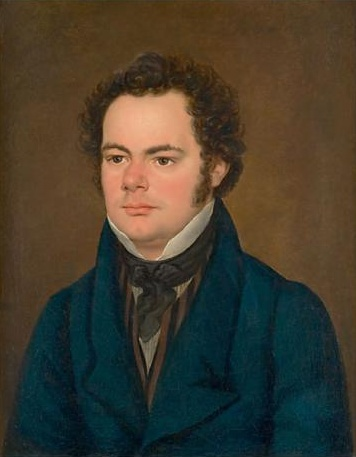
Portrait of Franz Schubert by Franz Eybl (1827)

The Deutsche Messe (German Mass), D 872, is a hymn-cycle by Franz Schubert written in 1827. Neither a Mass nor strictly speaking German, it was published in Vienna as what it is: Gesänge zur Feier des heiligen Opfers der Messe (Hymns for the Celebration of the Holy Offering of Mass). It sets a sequence of eight non-liturgical German poems by Johann Philipp Neumann, who commissioned Schubert's music, one or more of which could be used separately during Mass. A ninth hymn, given as an appendix, treats the Lord's Prayer, bringing the length to about 35 minutes when the music is performed, as it often now is, as one big concert work.

The cycle's original scoring was plain: SATB choir with organ accompaniment. Decades after Schubert died, a grander edition was published: SATB choir, 2 oboes, 2 clarinets, 2 bassoons, 2 horns, 2 trumpets, 3 trombones, timpani and basso continuo. Besides the now standard misnomer Deutsche Messe, the cycle is also sometimes called the Wind Mass due to the preponderance of wind instruments in this just-listed orchestration.

== Background ==
The Deutsche Messe stems from a tradition of low masses, settings of religious texts in vernacular languages in Austria and southern Germany. It was commissioned by Johann Philipp Neumann, who was interested in simple music designed to appeal to "the widest possible congregation". Neumann wrote the German hymns, which Schubert scored in a block-chordal, homophonic style, suitable for congregational singing. Schubert commenced the work in December 1826, completing and publishing it in 1827. Neumann had previously written the libretto for Schubert's unfinished opera, Shakuntala.

Schubert intended it for usage in Catholic church service. However, censorship prevented this from taking place; it was not approved for liturgical use. The work has since gained popularity, and has been translated into other languages. Richard Proulx arranged a version in English.

== Structure ==
The work contains nine movements, including eight hymns and an appendix. Most of the work is set in a moderate (mäßig) to slow (langsam) tempo, reflecting the solemnity of the service as well as consideration of church acoustics.

Each of the hymns has a Latin counterpart in the Order of Mass. Performance time is approximately 40 minutes, if performed as a cycle with all the verses.

1. Zum Eingang (At the Introit), Mäßig, F major, common time: "Wohin soll ich mich wenden"
2. Zum Gloria, Mit Majestät, B♭ major, common time: "Ehre, Ehre sei Gott in der Höhe"
3. Zum Evangelium und Credo, Nicht zu langsam, G major, 6/8: "Noch lag die Schöpfung formlos da"
4. Zum Offertorium, Sehr langsam, C major, 3/4: "Du gabst, o Herr, mir Sein und Leben"
5. Zum Sanctus, Sehr langsam, E♭ major, 3/4: "Heilig, heilig, heilig"
6. Nach der Wandlung (After the consecration), Sehr langsam, G major, common time: "Betrachtend Deine Huld und Güte"
7. Zum Agnus Dei, Mäßig, B♭ major, 6/8: "Mein Heiland, Herr und Meister"
8. Schlußgesang (Recessional hymn), Nicht zu langsam, F major, 3/4: "Herr, Du hast mein Flehn vernommen"
9. Anhang (Appendix): Das Gebet des Herrn (The Lord's Prayer), Mäßig, E minor ending in parallel major, 6/8: "Anbetend Deine Macht und Größe"
