= Lasst uns froh und munter sein =

Traditional German Christmas carol

"Lasst uns froh und munter sein"
Guitar MIDI rendition (1:01)

"Lasst uns froh und munter sein" ("Let us be happy and cheerful") is a traditional German carol from the Hunsrück/Taunus region. There are some regional variations in the lyrics. (Note: The second verse is not widely used.) The song is traditionally sung during Advent on December 5, the evening before Saint Nicholas Day (Nikolausabend), the feast day of Saint Nicholas of Myra.

== Lyrics ==
Lasst uns froh und munter sein
und uns recht von Herzen freun!
Lustig, lustig, tralera-lera,
bald ist Nikolausabend da,
bald ist Nikolausabend da!

Bald ist uns're Schule aus;
dann zieh'n wir vergnügt nach Haus.
Lustig, lustig, ...

Dann stell ich den Teller auf,
Nikolaus legt gewiß was drauf.
Lustig, lustig, ...

Wenn ich schlaf, dann träume ich:
Jetzt bringt Nikolaus was für mich.
Lustig, lustig, ...

Wenn ich aufgestanden bin,
lauf ich schnell zum Teller hin.
Lustig, lustig, ...

Nikolaus ist ein guter Mann,
dem man nicht g'nug danken kann.
Lustig, lustig, ...

Let us be happy and cheerful
And really be happy in our hearts!
Jolly, jolly, tralala-lala,
Soon Nicholas Eve is here!
Soon Nicholas Eve is here!

Soon our school day ends,
Home I'll go with all my friends.
Jolly, jolly, ...

Then I put the plate out
Nick'll surely put somethin' on it.
Jolly, jolly, ...

When I sleep, then I dream:
Now Nicholas brings me something.
Jolly, jolly, ...

When I am woken up,
I run quickly to the plate.
Jolly, jolly, ...

Nicholas is a good man
Whom we can't thank enough.
Jolly, jolly, ...
