= O Heiland, reiß die Himmel auf =

German Advent song (1622)

- Advent song
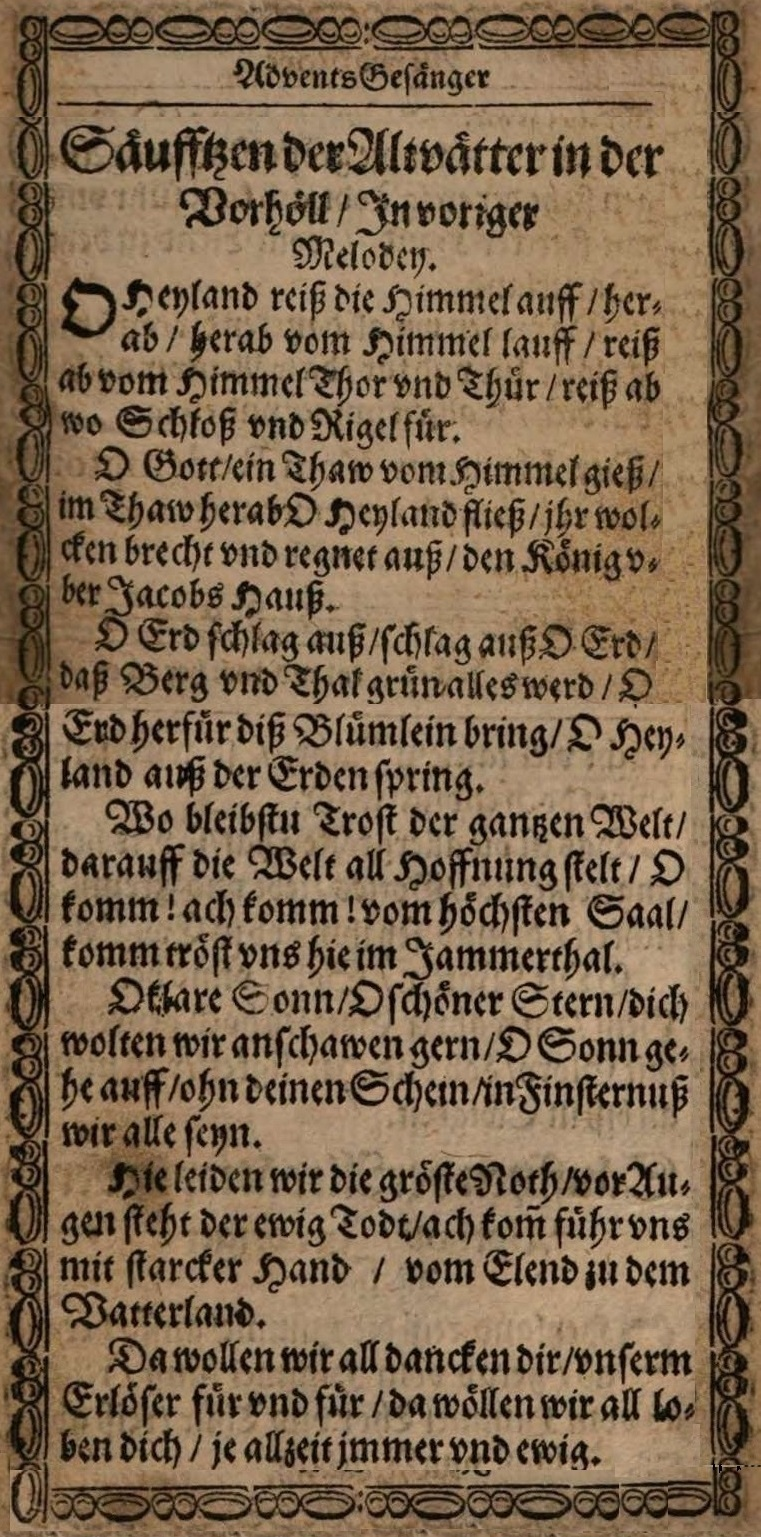
- A 1630 print from Würzburg
- English: O Saviour, break the Heavens open
- Text: by Friedrich Spee (attributed)
- Language: German
- Published: 1622
- Melody

"O Heiland, reiß die Himmel auf" (O Saviour, tear open the heavens) is a Christian Advent song. The text was first printed in 1622, attributed to Friedrich Spee; the melody was first printed in 1666.

== History ==
"O Heiland, reiß die Himmel auf" was first published in Würzburg in the collection Das Allerschönste Kind in der Welt (The most beautiful child in the world). Its author is not named, but is thought to be Friedrich Spee, due to similarities to his later collection Trutznachtigall. The text was written in the context of the Thirty Years' War, the plague and witch trials. The text was first sung to the melody of Conditor alme siderum. The melody known today appeared first in the Rheinfelsisches Gesangbuch of 1666.

The song is focused on the longing for the arrival of a Saviour. It has been included in both Catholic and Protestant hymnals; in Protestant hymnals sometimes with an added seventh stanza of unknown authorship. It is part of the Catholic Gotteslob as GL 231, of the Evangelisches Gesangbuch as EG 7, in the hymnal of Swiss Reformed churches as RG 361,. in the Methodist hymnal as EM 141, in the hymnal Feiern & Loben as FL 189, and in the Mennonite hymnal as MG 244.

== Theme and text ==
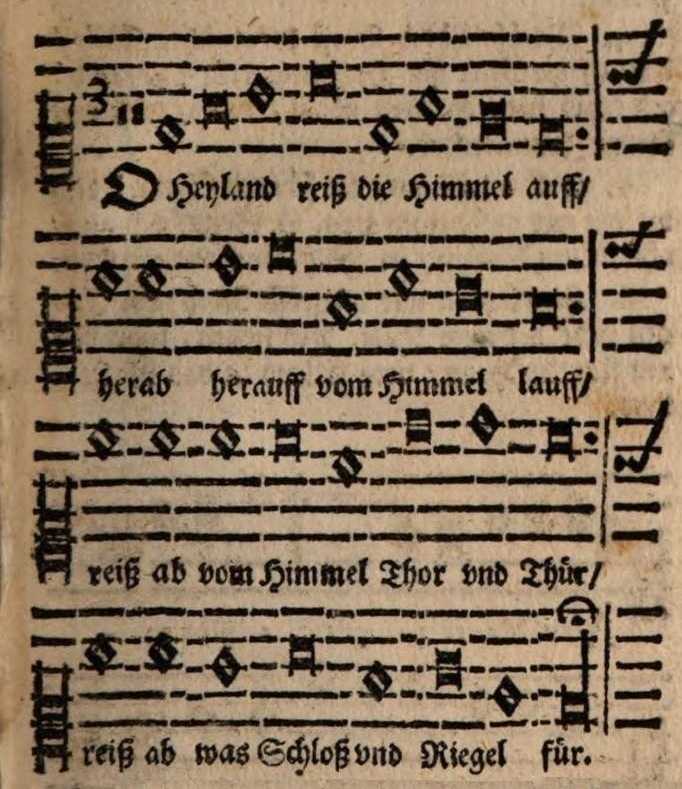
First print of the melody, Rheinfelsisches Gesangbuch 1666

The song is based on a verse in the Book of Isaiah, in the Latin text from the Vulgate that the author knew "Rorate coeli de super, et nubes pluant justum: aperiatur terra, et germinet Salvatorem" which was set in the Gregorian chant Rorate caeli. The beginning is related to another verse by Isaiah: "Ach dass du den Himmel zerrissest und führest herab, dass die Berge vor dir zerflössen" From the fourth stanza on, the believers appear as a "we" (wir), describing the miserable conditions that need to change.

O Heiland, reiß die Himmel auf,
herab, herab vom Himmel lauf,
reiß ab vom Himmel Tor und Tür,
reiß ab, wo Schloss und Riegel für.

O Gott, ein’ Tau vom Himmel gieß,
im Tau herab, o Heiland, fließ.
Ihr Wolken, brecht und regnet aus
den König über Jakobs Haus.

O Erd, schlag aus, schlag aus, o Erd,
dass Berg und Tal grün alles werd.
O Erd, herfür dies Blümlein bring,
o Heiland, aus der Erden spring.

Wo bleibst du, Trost der ganzen Welt,
darauf sie all ihr Hoffnung stellt?
O komm, ach komm vom höchsten Saal,
komm, tröst uns hier im Jammertal.

O klare Sonn, du schöner Stern,
dich wollten wir anschauen gern;
o Sonn, geh auf, ohn deinen Schein
in Finsternis wir alle sein.

Hier leiden wir die größte Not,
vor Augen steht der ewig Tod.
Ach komm, führ uns mit starker Hand
vom Elend zu dem Vaterland.

Added later and first appeared in David Gregor Corner's collection in 1631:

Da wollen wir all danken dir,
unserm Erlöser, für und für;
da wollen wir all loben dich
zu aller Zeit und ewiglich.

== Melody and settings ==
The melody in Dorian mode appears first in the Rheinfelsisches Gesangbuch of 1666. It may have been composed especially for the text.

The hymn was set to music by composers such as Johannes Brahms, Johann Nepomuk David, Hugo Distler and Johannes Weyrauch. Richard Wetz used it in his Christmas Oratorio.
