= Advent är mörker och kyla =

Swedish Advent song

- Hymn
- Occasion: Advent
- Written: 1969
- Text: by Lars Åke Lundberg
- Language: Swedish
- Melody: by Margareta Melin; by Lars Åke Lundberg

"Advent är mörker och kyla" is a Swedish Advent song with lyrics written by Margareta Melin in 1969, and music by Lars Åke Lundberg (number 609 in Den svenska psalmboken 1986) and another melody by Torgny Erséus (number 484 in Psalmer och Sånger 1987).

== Publication ==
- Den svenska psalmboken 1986 as number 609 in the section "Barn och familj".
- Psalmer och Sånger 1987 as number 484 in the section "Advent".
- Frälsningsarméns sångbok 1990 as number 717 in the section "Kyrkoårets högtider, Advent".

== Recordings ==
An early recording was done by Lennart Eng inside Färila Church in Hälsingland in September 1976, and appeared on the album O helga natt.
