= Rorate caeli =

Antiphon sung during Christian liturgy

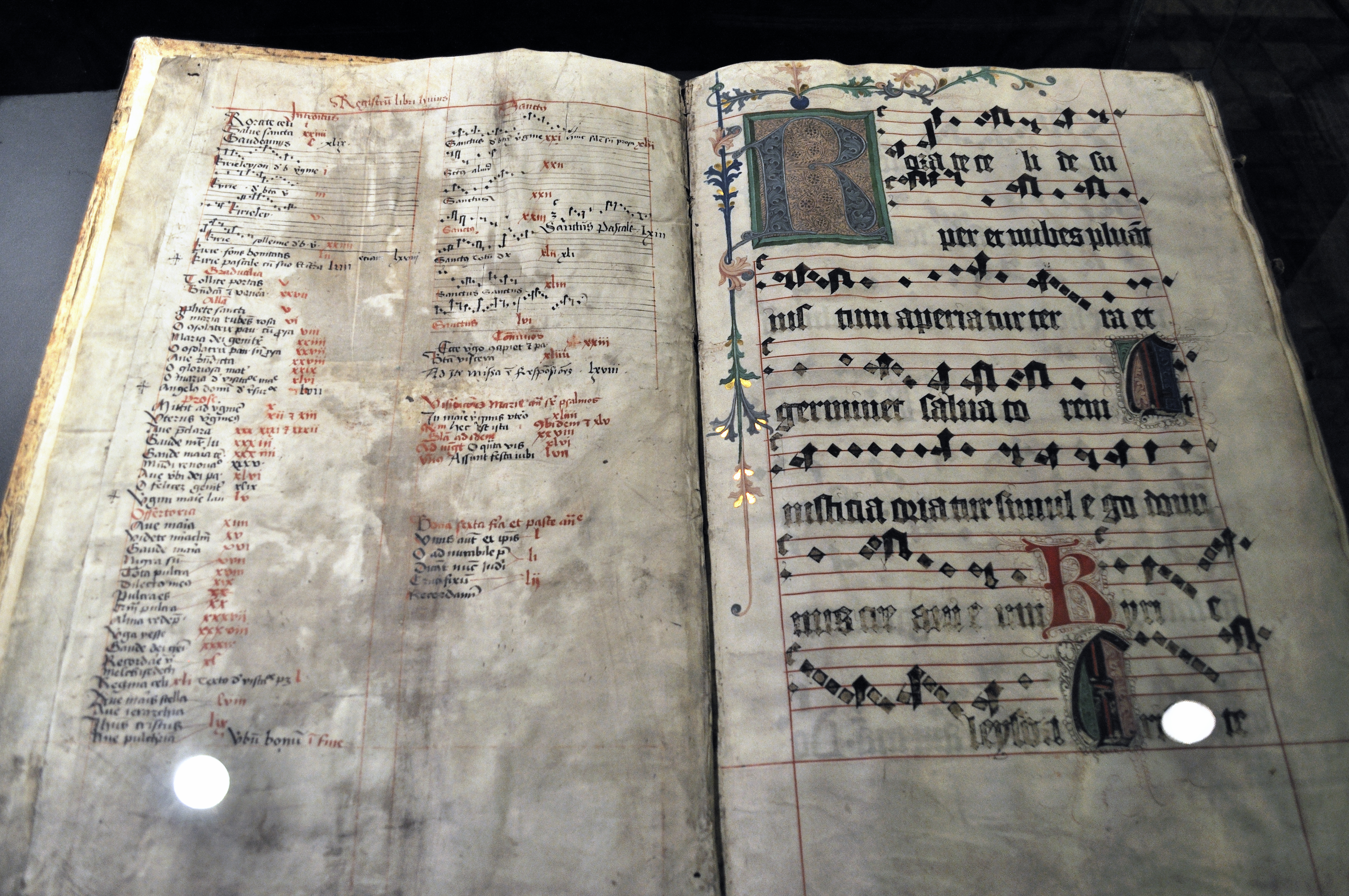
- Medieval manuscript of the Gregorian chant "Rorate caeli"
- Type: Mass
- Classification: Catholic
- Scripture: (Isaiah 45:8)
- Other name: Rorate coeli

"Rorate caeli" or "Rorate coeli" ('Drop down, ye heavens') are the opening words of Isaiah 45:8 in the Vulgate. The text appears at several points in the Christian liturgy of the Western Church during Advent.

== Use in the Western Mass and Offices ==
The text is frequently sung to plainsong at Mass and in the Divine Office during Advent where it gives expression to the longings of Patriarchs and Prophets, and symbolically of the Church, for the coming of the Messiah. Throughout Advent it occurs daily as the versicle and response after the hymn at Vespers.

The text is used in the extraordinary form of the Roman Rite:

- as the Introit for the Fourth Sunday in Advent, for Wednesday in Ember Week, for the feast of the Expectation of the Blessed Virgin Mary, and for votive Masses of the Blessed Virgin during Advent;
- as a versicle in the first matins responsory of Tuesday in the first week of Advent;
- as the first antiphon at Lauds for the Tuesday preceding Christmas and the second antiphon at Matins of the Expectation of the Blessed Virgin;
- in the second responsory for Friday of the third week of Advent and in the fifth responsory in Matins of the Expectation of the Blessed Virgin.

The Introit plainsong may be found in the various editions of the Roman Gradual and the Solesmes "Liber Usualis", p. 125. Under the heading, "Prayer of the Churches of France during Advent", Prosper Guéranger (Liturgical Year, Advent tr., Dublin, 1870, pp. 155–6) gives it as an antiphon to each of a series of prayers ("Ne irascaris", "Peccavimus", "Vide Domine", "Consolamini") expressive of penitence, expectation, comfort, and furnishes the Latin text and an English rendering of the Prayer. The Latin text and a different English rendering are also given in the Baltimore "Manual of Prayers" (pp. 603–4). A plain-song setting of the "Prayer", or series of prayers, is given in the Solesmes "Manual of Gregorian Chant" (Rome-Tournai, 1903, 313–5) in plain-song notation, and in a slightly simpler form in modern notation in the "Roman Hymnal" (New York, 1884, pp. 140–3), as also in "Les principaux chants liturgiques" (Paris, 1875, pp. 111–2) and "Recueil d'anciens et de nouveaux cantiques notés" (Paris, 1886, pp. 218–9).

== Advent Prose ==
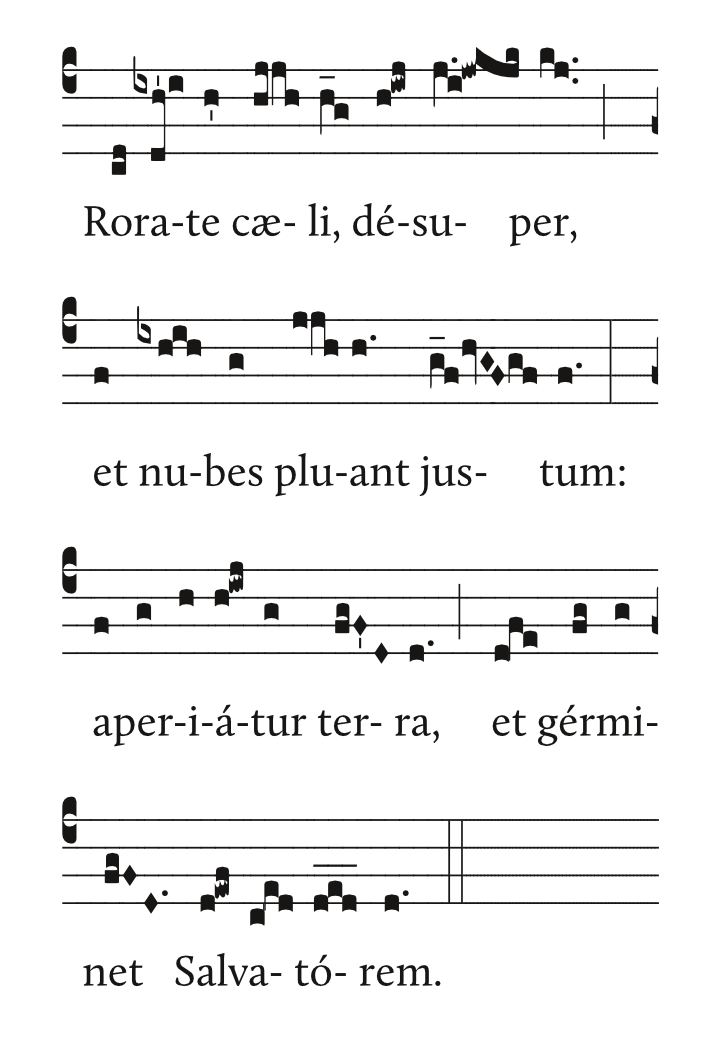
The Introit Rorate caeli in square notation, with the melody in the sound file below

In the seventeenth century, Rorate was arranged into a hymn combining the traditional text with other scriptural passages used in the liturgy for Advent. The earliest known version is in the Oratorian Officia Propria (1673); it also appears in French diocesan rites, such as the Rouen Processional of 1729 and 1763.

The hymn was popularized in English by the English Hymnal. In the Book of Hymns (Edinburgh, 1910), p. 4, W. Rooke-Ley translates the text in connection with the O Antiphons ('Mystic dew from heaven Unto earth is given: / Break, O earth, a Saviour yield—Fairest flower of the field'). The text also forms the basis for the hymn 'O Heiland, reiß die Himmel auf'.

The traditional English translation of the text is from the English Hymnal (except for the third verse, and with the last verse modified here to follow the Latin).

Drop down ye heavens from above
An excerpt of Rorate coeli sung in Latin

In addition to traditional plainsong, musical settings of the Rorate coeli have been composed by, amongst others, Giovanni Pierluigi da Palestrina (1572), Jacob Handl (1586), William Byrd (1605) and Heinrich Schütz (1639).

Settings of the English text, Drop down ye heavens, have been written by a number of composers, including Judith Weir (written in 1983 for the choir of Trinity College Chapel, Cambridge), Andrew Cusworth and Richard Hey Lloyd (1979).

Latin	English
Roráte caéli désuper, et núbes plúant jústum.	Drop down, ye heavens, from above, and let the skies pour down righteousness.
Ne irascáris Dómine, ne ultra memíneris iniquitátis: ecce cívitas Sáncti fácta est desérta: Síon desérta fácta est, Jerúsalem desoláta est: dómus sanctificatiónis túæ et glóriæ túæ, ubi laudavérunt te pátres nóstri.	Be not wroth very sore, O Lord, neither remember iniquity for ever: thy holy city is a wilderness, Sion is a wilderness, Jerusalem a desolation: our holy and our beautiful house, where our fathers praised thee.
Peccávimus, et fácti súmus tamquam immúndus nos, et cecídimus quasi fólium univérsi: et iniquitátes nóstræ quasi véntus abstulérunt nos: abscondísti faciem túam a nóbis, et allisísti nos in mánu iniquitátis nóstræ.	We have sinned, and are as an unclean thing, and we all do fade as a leaf: and our iniquities, like the wind, have taken us away: thou hast hid thy face from us: and hast consumed us, because of our iniquities.
Víde Dómine afflictiónem pópuli túi, et mítte quem missúrus es: emítte Agnum dominatórem térræ, de Pétra desérti ad móntem fíliæ Síon: ut áuferat ípse júgum captivitátis nóstræ.	Behold, O Lord, the affliction of thy people, and send forth him whom thou wilt send; send forth the Lamb, the ruler of the earth, from Petra of the desert to the mount of the daughter of Sion: that he may take away the yoke of our captivity.
Vos testes mei, dicit Dóminus, et servus meus quem elégi; ut sciátis, et credátis mihi: ego sum, ego sum Dóminus, et non est absque me salvátor: et non est qui de manu mea éruat.	Ye are my witnesses, saith the Lord, and my servant whom I have chosen; that ye may know me and believe me: I, even I, am the Lord, and beside me there is no Saviour: and there is none that can deliver out of my hand.
Consolámini, consolámini, pópule méus: cito véniet sálus túa: quare mæróre consúmeris, quia innovávit te dólor? Salvábo te, nóli timére, égo enim sum Dóminus Déus túus, Sánctus Israël, Redémptor túus.	Comfort ye, comfort ye my people; my salvation shall not tarry: why wilt thou waste away in sadness? why hath sorrow seized thee? Fear not, for I will save thee: For I am the Lord thy God, the Holy One of Israel, thy Redeemer.

== Rorate Mass ==
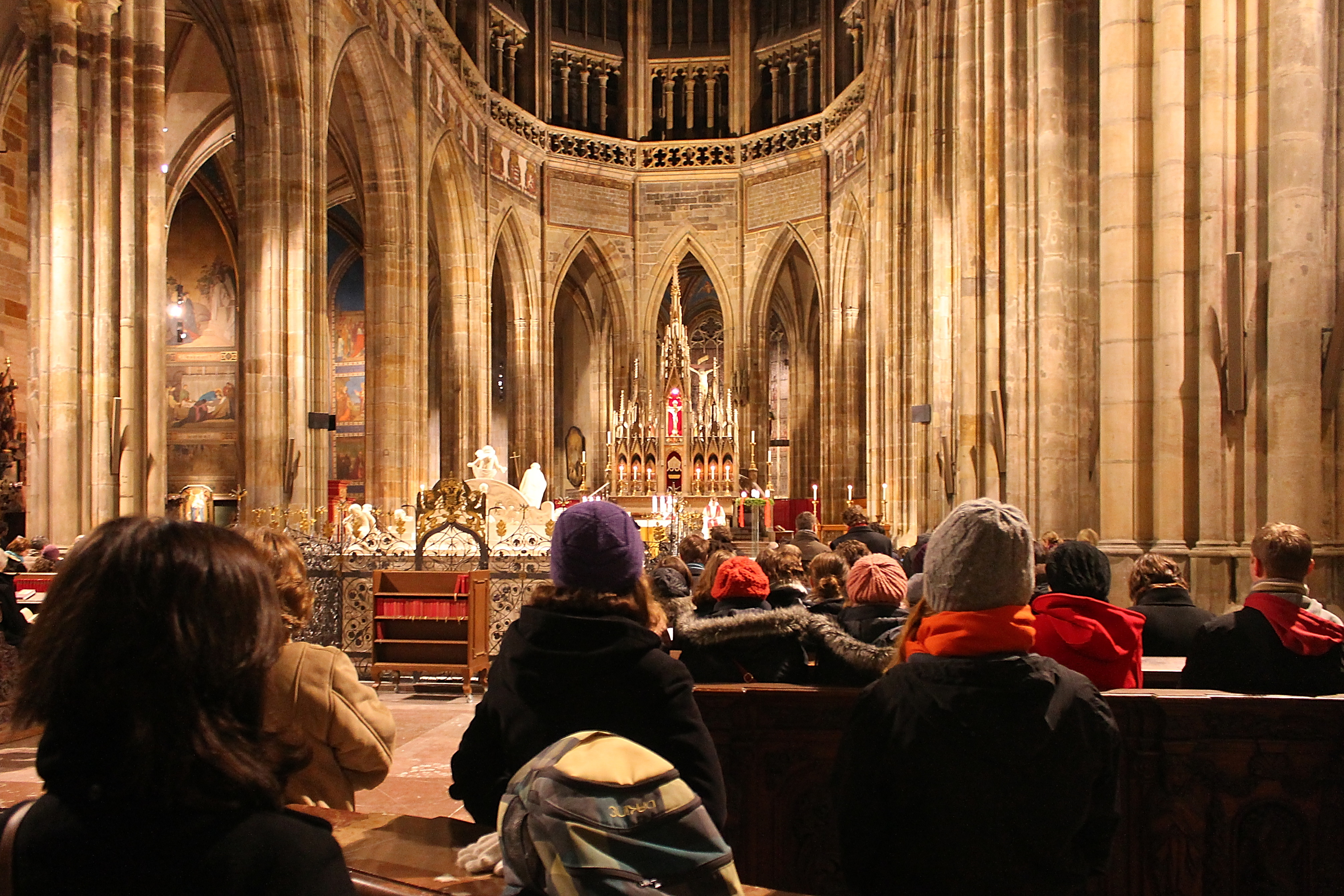
Rorate Mass in Prague Cathedral, Czech Republic

The Rorate Mass got its proper name from the first word of the Introit (Entrance antiphon): "Rorate caeli désuper et nubes pluant justum" ("Drop down dew, ye heavens, from above, and let the clouds rain the just").

In the extraordinary form of the Roman Rite, this Mass is celebrated very early in the morning on Saturdays during Advent. In some areas, it is celebrated on several or even all weekdays during Advent (the Votive Mass of Our Lady in Advent). This custom faded after liturgical changes that occurred after the Second Vatican Council.

The Rorate Mass is a Votive Mass in honor of the Virgin Mary for the season of Advent. It has a long tradition in the Catholic Church, especially in German-speaking areas. The Masses had to begin relatively early in the morning when it was still dark due to winter-time and were said by candlelight.

"Rorate Mass" is, originally, the name for a votive Mass of the Blessed Virgin in Advent, named by its introit (the same Rorate coeli as above). As such, its liturgical color is white. It is a tradition to celebrate such Rorate Masses in the early morning (before sunrise), accompanied by candle light in an otherwise dark church. In the ordinary form of the Roman Rite, it is often replaced by a Mass with the liturgical texts of the corresponding Advent weekday (consequently with violet vestments), or possibly the day's saint, but with the rest of the Rorate Mass traditions.

The Rorate Mass originated during the course of the Middle Ages as one of the various popular Advent devotions to the Blessed Virgin Mary which were then developed. As one of the themes of Advent is the Incarnation of Jesus Christ, the emergence of these devotions to the Blessed Virgin was natural. The Rorate Mass, in particular, was a favorite of the people. The Introit Antiphon, the Epistle, the Gradual, Gospel, and Communion Antiphon of the Rorate Mass were taken from the Mass of Ember Wednesday in Advent, the Offertory was taken from the Fourth Sunday of Advent, and the orations (prayers) from the Feast of the Annunciation.

The Rorate Mass was also known in the Middle Ages as the Missa aurea (the Golden Mass), because of the various promises added to it (varias enim promissiones adjungebant his Missis), and the Missa Angelica (the Angelic Mass) because of the Gospel reading which, recounting the Annunciation, opens with the words "Missus est Angelus Gábriel (The Angel Gabriel was sent)".

The Rorate Mass was celebrated in the following ways:

- According to Ordo Romanus XV (8th century), the Rorate Mass was said on the seven days preceding Christmas.
- Another tradition is to celebrate this Mass on the nine consecutive days prior to Christmas (Celebratio novendialis Missarum ((aurearum)) / A Novena of Golden Masses). This practice was permitted by the Sacred Congregation of Rites, especially to dioceses in Italy (1658, 1713, and 1718). It is a common Catholic practice to prepare for major events by a novena. This novena has the added symbolism of each day representing one of the nine months of Mary's pregnancy.
- In some places, the Rorate Mass is said on the Wednesday during the third week of Advent in place of the Mass of Ember Wednesday in Advent.
- In Germany, Austria, Poland, Bohemia, Croatia and Hungary the Rorate Mass was celebrated daily through the whole period of Advent. This was forbidden, of course, on the more solemn feasts if the saying of this Mass would cause a conventual Mass or a Mass of precept to be omitted. The Boldvensi Sacramentary (written in Hungary between 1192 and 1195) has a proper Preface text for the Rorate Mass "qui per BVM partum ecclesiae tuae tribuisti celebrare mirabile mysterium (You, who through the Offspring of the Blessed Virgin Mary, granted to your Church to celebrate the wonderful mystery)." Between 1774 and 1960, various permissions were granted regarding this practice by the Sacred Congregation of Rites.

There is also the custom in "Austria, Switzerland, and Germany" that "families walked in the dark of the early morning, (carrying lamps, candles, or later, flashlights) to church, where Mass was celebrated and favorites Advents hymns were sung.". This tradition is also alive in modern Poland; however, depending on local custom, it is celebrated either in the early morning or in the late evening of Advent weekdays.

"As a rule the Blessed Sacrament was exposed at the same time" as the Rorate Mass was being said. This was still customary "in many places" in the 1960s.

There is the custom of singing three times the antiphon "Ecce, Dominus veniet" at the conclusion of the Rorate Mass. After the Last Gospel, the Priest (and ministers if it is a Solemn High Mass) goes to the center of the altar. He then intones the antiphon three times after which the antiphon is continued by those present. Each intonation is begun at higher pitch than the previous one. This mirrors the practice of the three-fold "Ecce Lignum Crucis" on Good Friday and the three-fold Alleluia at the Easter Vigil. The text of the antiphon reads: "Ecce Dominus veniet, et omnes sancti ejus cum eo: et erit in die illa lux magna, alleluia. / Behold, the Lord will come, and with Him all His saints; and on that day there shall be a great light, alleluia." The "Ecce, Dominus veniet" is the third antiphon for the Office of the First Sunday of Advent. The reference to the great light is fitting for a Mass that was just conducted in candlelight and during which the sun has risen.

== See also ==
- Expectation of the Blessed Virgin Mary
- Simbang Gabi
- Misa de Gallo
- Regina Caeli
