= Macht hoch die Tür =

German Advent hymn, 1623

- Lutheran hymn
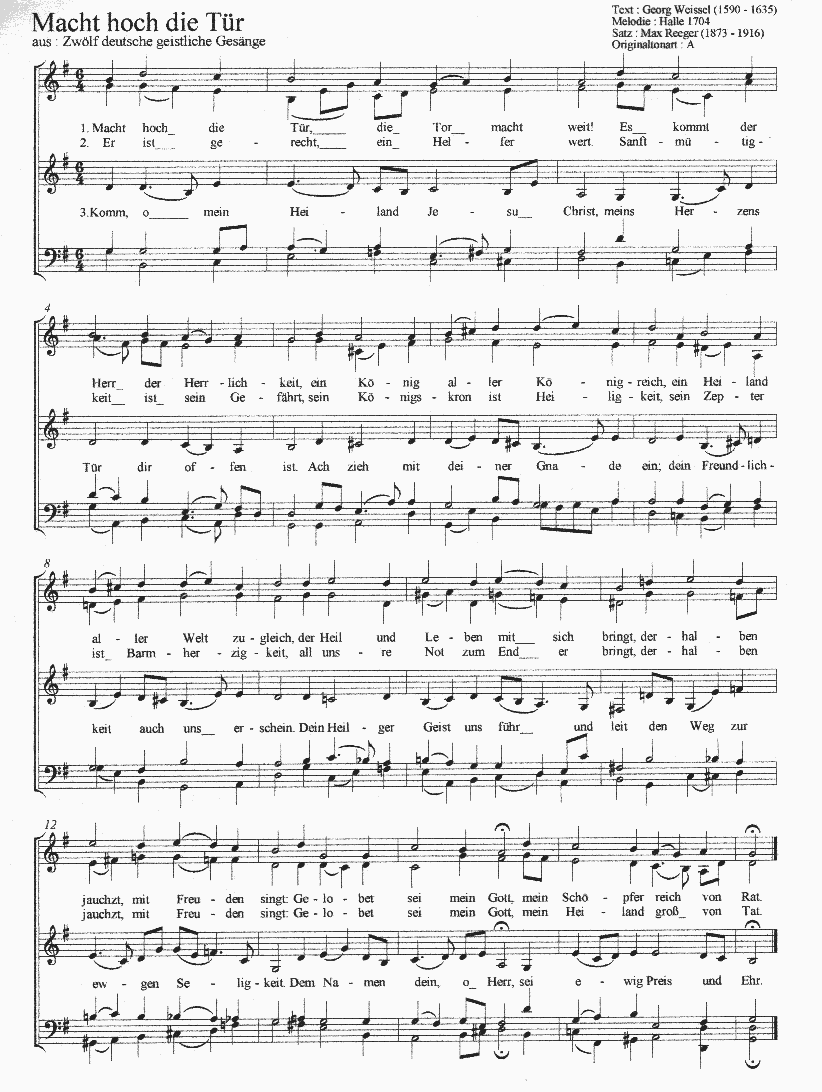
- "Macht hoch die Tür" in a five-part setting by Max Reger
- Written: 1623
- Text: by Georg Weissel
- Language: German
- Melody: by: Johann Stobäus; Johann Anastasius Freylinghausen
- Composed: 1623; 1704
- Published: 1642

"Macht hoch die Tür" ("Fling wide the door") is a popular German Advent hymn, written in 17th century Ducal Prussia. The lyrics were written by Georg Weissel in 1623 for the inauguration of the Altroßgärter Kirche in Königsberg. The melody that is now associated with the text appeared first in 1704 in the hymnal by Johann Anastasius Freylinghausen.

"Macht hoch die Tür" appears as number 1 in the current German Protestant hymnal Evangelisches Gesangbuch (EG 1). It is also part of the Catholic hymnal Gotteslob (GL 218), among others. As one of the best-known and most popular Advent songs, it was translated into English by Catherine Winkworth in 1855 as "Lift up your heads, ye mighty gates". It has also been translated into Swedish and Norwegian, as well as Indian languages like Telugu and Tamil.

== History ==
The lyrics of "Macht hoch die Tür" were written by Georg Weissel in 1623. He wrote the hymn during the occasion of the inauguration of the Altroßgärter Kirche in Königsberg on the second Sunday in Advent that year, where he was appointed minister the following Sunday. For the service of his appointment as minister the following Sunday, he wrote "Such, wer da will, ein ander Ziel".

It took until the mid of the 19th century that the hymn was widely published in Protestant hymnals. In the 20th century, it became a core song in hymnals. The 1938 Kirchenlied was the first Catholic collection to include it.

"Macht hoch die Tür" appears as number 1 in the current German Protestant hymnal Evangelisches Gesangbuch (EG 1). It is also part of the Catholic hymnal Gotteslob (GL 218), and published in 62 hymnals. In the second half of the 20th century it was also included in several collections of Christmas carols beyond church usage.

== Text ==
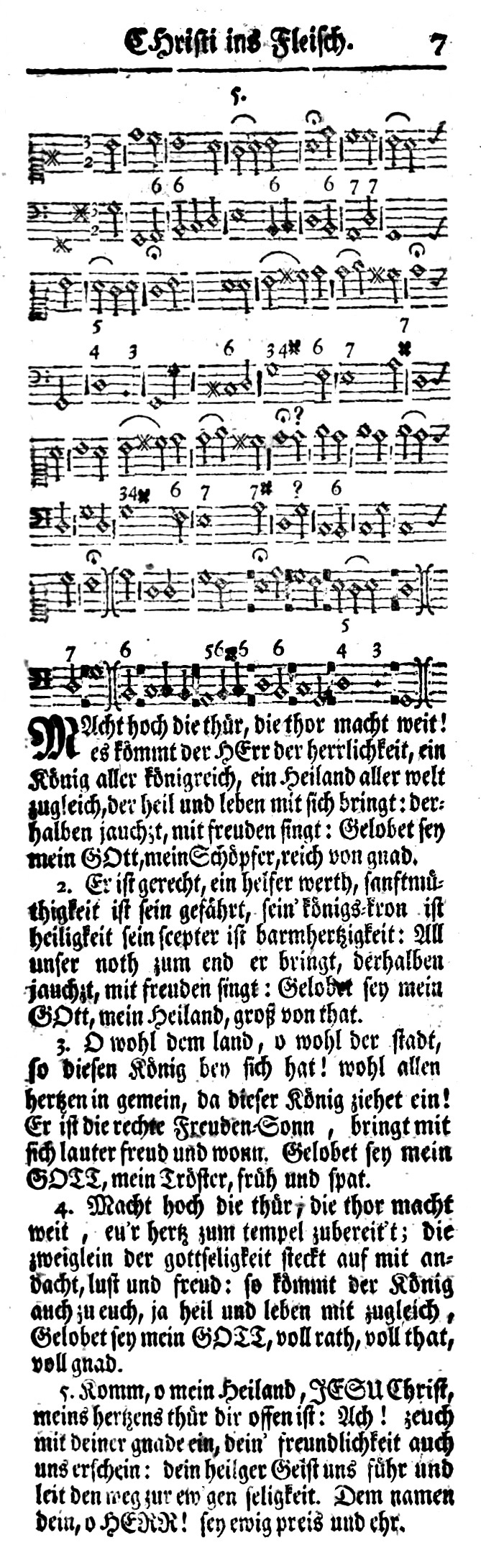
The hymn in the 1734 Freylinghausensches Gesangbuch, for the first time with the melody that became popular

The lyrics of "Macht hoch die Tür" are in five stanzas of eight lines each. The beginning is based on the call to open the gates for the King from Psalm 24, which causes the question for which king (Psalms 24:7–10). This passage originally meant the celebration of the entry of the Ark of the Covenant in the Temple in Jerusalem. It was early interpreted in the Christian church as referring also to the entry of Jesus in Jerusalem, narrated by Matthew (Matthew 21:1–9) quoting Zechariah (Zechariah 9:9). Both the psalm and the gospel are intended readings in the Protestant church in Germany for the first Advent Sunday.

The last two lines of all stanzas express praise, similar to a refrain. The first one praises God, the second the Saviour, the third the Comforter, the fourth the Trinity, and the final one the name of God for ever.

"Macht hoch die Tür, die Tor macht weit;
es kommt der Herr der Herrlichkeit,
ein König aller Königreich,
ein Heiland aller Welt zugleich,
der Heil und Leben mit sich bringt;
derhalben jauchzt, mit Freuden singt:
Gelobet sei mein Gott,
mein Schöpfer reich von Rat.

Er ist gerecht, ein Helfer wert;
Sanftmütigkeit ist sein Gefährt,
sein Königskron ist Heiligkeit,
sein Zepter ist Barmherzigkeit;
all unsre Not zum End er bringt,
derhalben jauchzt, mit Freuden singt:
Gelobet sei mein Gott,
mein Heiland groß von Tat.

O wohl dem Land, o wohl der Stadt,
so diesen König bei sich hat.
Wohl allen Herzen insgemein,
da dieser König ziehet ein.
Er ist die rechte Freudensonn,
bringt mit sich lauter Freud und Wonn.
Gelobet sei mein Gott,
mein Tröster früh und spat.

Macht hoch die Tür, die Tor macht weit,
eu'r Herz zum Tempel zubereit'.
Die Zweiglein der Gottseligkeit
steckt auf mit Andacht, Lust und Freud;
so kommt der König auch zu euch,
ja, Heil und Leben mit zugleich.
Gelobet sei mein Gott,
voll Rat, voll Tat, voll Gnad.

Komm, o mein Heiland Jesu Christ,
meins Herzens Tür dir offen ist.
Ach zieh mit deiner Gnade ein;
dein Freundlichkeit auch uns erschein.
Dein Heilger Geist uns führ und leit
den Weg zur ewgen Seligkeit.
Dem Namen dein, o Herr,
sei ewig Preis und Ehr.

Lift up your heads, ye mighty gates!
Behold, the King of Glory waits;
The King of kings is drawing near,
The Savior of the world is here.
Life and salvation He doth bring,
Wherefore rejoice and gladly sing:
We praise Thee, Father, now,
Creator, wise art Thou!

A Helper just He comes to thee,
His chariot is humility,
His kingly crown is holiness,
His scepter, pity in distress,
The end of all our woe He brings;
Wherefore the earth is glad and sings:
We praise Thee, Savior, now,
Mighty in deed art Thou!

O blest the land, the city blest,
Where Christ the Ruler is confessed!
O happy hearts and happy homes
To whom this King in triumph comes!
The cloudless Sun of joy He is,
Who bringeth pure delight and bliss.
We praise Thee, Spirit, now,
Our Comforter art Thou!

Fling wide the portals of your heart;
Make it a temple set apart
From earthly use for Heaven's employ,
Adorned with prayer and love and joy.
So shall your Sovereign enter in
And new and nobler life begin.
To Thee, O God, be praise
For word and deed and grace!

Redeemer, come! I open wide
My heart to Thee; here, Lord, abide!
Let me Thy inner presence feel,
Thy grace and love in me reveal;
Thy Holy Spirit guide us on
Until our glorious goal is won.
Eternal praise and fame
We offer to Thy name.

== Melodies ==
It took some time until the text of "Macht hoch die Tür" was connected with the melody popular today. The first music for the lyrics was a five-part choral setting by Johann Stobäus, whom Weissel knew from his time of studies in Königsberg. In 1642, Stobäus re-published Preußische Fest-Lieder auf das ganze Jahr für 5–8 Stimmen by his teacher Johannes Eccard, which was first printed in 1598. He included his setting of "Macht hoch die Tür" in its Erster Teil (First part).

The melody that is now associated with the text appeared first in 1704 in a hymnal by Johann Anastasius Freylinghausen, titled Geist-reiches Gesang-Buch (Song book rich in spirit).

The hymn has often been set to music. Friedrich Silcher composed a four-part setting:

Max Reger composed a five-part choral setting, No. 1 of his 1899 composition Zwölf deutsche geistliche Gesänge, WoO VI/13/1.

== Translations ==
As one of the best-known and most popular Advent songs, "Macht hoch die Tür" was translated to several languages. Niels Johannes Holm translated it to Norwegian in 1829, revised by Magnus Brostrup Landstad in 1861, as "Gjør døren høy". Catherine Winkworth wrote a translation to English in 1855, "Lift up your heads, ye mighty gates". A Swedish version, "Gör porten hög" was translated by Jacob Arrhenius for Jesper Swedberg's Book of Hymns, printed in 1694. It was revised for a later edition by Johan Olaf Wallin. In English, it has been translated as "Fling Wide the Door" by Gracia Grindal.

== Recordings ==
The hymn is included in the album Sinfonia di Natale by Rondò Veneziano (1995).
