= Such, wer da will, ein ander Ziel =

17th-century Lutheran hymn

- Lutheran hymn
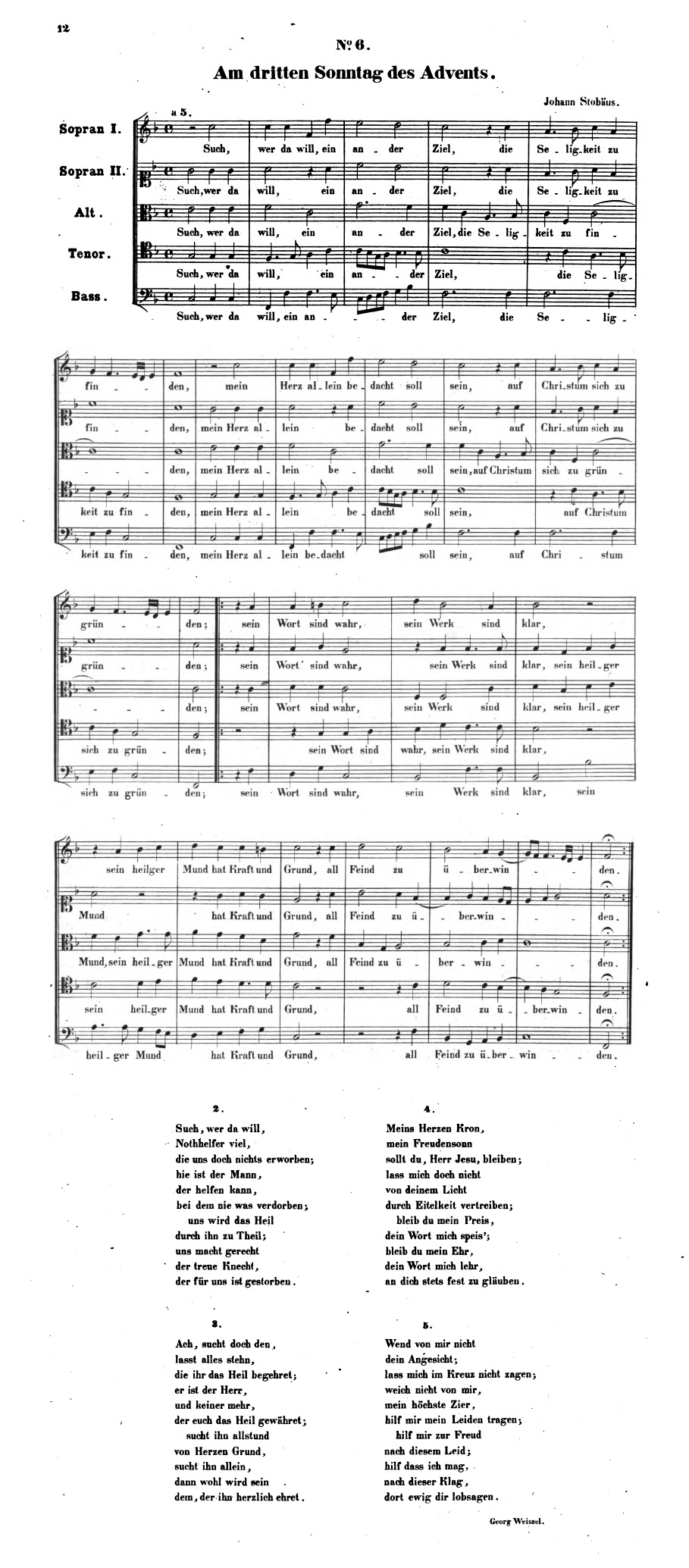
- A motet on the 1613 tune by Johann Stobäus, 1642, reprinted in 1858
- Written: 1623
- Text: by Georg Weissel
- Language: German
- Melody: by: Johann Stobäus; Peter Sohren
- Published: 1642

"Such, wer da will, ein ander Ziel" (Search, whoever wants, for a different goal) is a Lutheran hymn in five stanzas with a text written by Georg Weissel in 1623 to a melody that Johann Stobäus had created in 1613.

== History ==
The Lutheran theologian Georg Weissel was appointed pastor of the Altrossgarten Church in Königsberg in 1623. For the inauguration of the church on the second Sunday in Advent that year, he wrote the hymn "Macht hoch die Tür". When he took up the post as pastor the following Sunday, he wrote "Such, wer da will, ein ander Ziel" for the occasion.

Weissel knew Johann Stobäus, the composer of the tune, already from the time of studies in Königsberg. He used a tune that Stobäus had created in 1613 for a wedding hymn "Wie's Gott bestellt, mir wohlgefällt".

The earliest extant print of "Such, wer da will" is a five-part motet by Stobäus in a collection Preußische Festlieder (Prussian festive hymns) that Stobäus published in 1642, of his works and those of his teacher Johannes Eccard. The song was included in several hymnals. In the current German Protestan hymnal Evangelisches Gesangbuch as EG 346.

== Theme and form ==
The gospel for the third Sunday in Advent (Matthew 11:2–10) contains a question from John the Baptist: "Art thou he that should come, or do we look for another?" The answer by Jesus is the starting point for the hymn: Jesus is seen as the leader to follow, the redeemer and the comforter when facing trouble and death. The first stanza is an individual profession, the second focused on the congregation, the third a missionary invitation, and the last two individual prayer. It is prominently Weissels own profession at the beginning of his tenure as minister, to follow Christ alone, as both Paul and Luther had taught. Other Nothelfer (helpers in need) are rejected, which can be read as a rejection of both the Catholic belief in the intercession of saints, and of superstition.

Weissel used the complex form of a wedding song by an anonymous author. Each stanza has eleven lines, eight of them with only two stressed syllables (1, 2, 4, 5, 7, 8, 9, 10), the others with three stresses. The rhyming scheme requires high literary art. Weissel's text was so good that it was not altered later.

== Melodies and settings ==
Johann Stobäus wrote a melody in 1613, which shows characteristic leaps and syncopes. He composed a five-part motet in 1642. When a hymnal for several Lutheran provinces was edited in the 1920s, the tune by Stobäus was replaced by the melody of "Bis hierher hat mich Gott gebracht" by Peter Sohren, but for the hymnal Evangelisches Gesangbuch the original melody was restored. An American-German Lutheran hymnal of 1894 has the hymn with the melody of "Es ist gewisslich an der Zeit" by Martin Luther.

Karl Marx composed in 1948 a motet Such, wer da will, ein ander Ziel, set for two to three voices and two instruments. Gustav Gunsenheimer included in 1968 the first stanza to conclude his Evangelienmotette Die Versuchung Jesu.
