= Georg Weissel =

German Lutheran minister and hymn writer

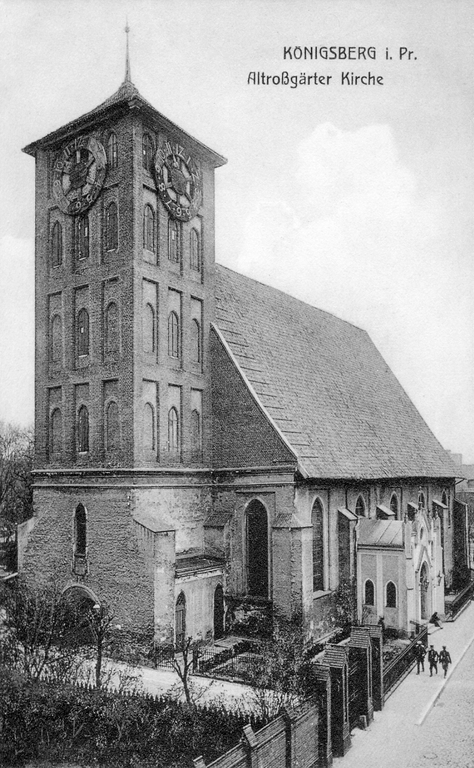
- The Altrossgarten Church in Königsberg, which Weissel inaugurated in 1623 and where he served as minister
- Born: 1590; Domnau, Duchy of Prussia, a vassal of the Polish–Lithuanian Commonwealth
- Died: 1 August 1635 (aged 45); Königsberg, Duchy of Prussia, Brandenburg-Prussia
- Occupations: Lutheran minister; Hymn writer

Georg Weissel (1590 – 1 August 1635) was a German Lutheran minister and hymn writer.

Born in Domnau in Ducal Prussia, a vassal of the Polish–Lithuanian Commonwealth. Weissel studied theology and music at the University of Königsberg, with the musicians Johann Eccard and Johann Stobäus, among others. After working as a rector in Friedland, he was ordained as minister of the Altrossgarten Church in Königsberg on the second Sunday in Advent 1623.

Weissel was a member of the group of poets Kürbishütte, along with Simon Dach, Heinrich Albert, Peter von Hagen, Valentin Thilo and Georg Reimann. Weissel died in Königsberg.

23 of his songs, written following the rules of Opitz, are extant. His most popular hymn was written on the occasion of the inauguration of the Altrossgarten Church in 1623. The Advent hymn "Macht hoch die Tür", paraphrasing Psalm 24, begins the current Protestant hymnal Evangelisches Gesangbuch (EG). It is now present in most Christian hymnals including the Catholic Gotteslob (GL 218). The current Protestant hymnal has two more of his hymns, "O Tod, wo ist dein Stachel" (EG 113) and "Such, wer da will, ein ander Ziel" (EG 346), which he wrote on the occasion of his ordination in Königsberg.

Catherine Winkworth translated the Advent hymn in 1853 as "Lift up your heads, ye mighty gates". Johann Sebastian Bach used Weissel's hymn "Nun liebe Seel, nun ist es Zeit" in Part V of his Christmas Oratorio.

== Literature ==
- Johannes Block: Georg Weissel. In: Wolfgang Herbst (ed.): Komponisten und Liederdichter des Evangelischen Gesangbuchs. Göttingen 1999
- Wolfdietrich von Kloeden (1998). "WEISSEL, Georg". In Bautz, Traugott (ed.). Biographisch-Bibliographisches Kirchenlexikon (BBKL) (in German). Vol. 13. Herzberg: Bautz. cols. 691–693. ISBN 3-88309-072-7.
- Werner Krause: Es kommt der Herr der Herrlichkeit – Wie das Adventslied "Macht hoch die Tür, die Tor macht weit" entstand. Verlag der St. Johannis-Druckerei, Lahr-Dinglingen 1900 (4th edition. 2004). ISBN 3-501-18304-6.
