= Nun liebe Seel, nun ist es Zeit =

Lutheran hymn for Epiphany

- German Lutheran hymn
- English: Now dear soul, now it is time
- Related: Motet by Johannes Eccard
- Occasion: Epiphany
- Written: before 1635
- Text: Georg Weissel
- Melody: Sethus Calvisius
- Published: 1642

"Nun liebe Seel, nun ist es Zeit", alternatively written "Nun, liebe Seel, nun ist es Zeit" (Now, dear soul, now it is time), is a Lutheran hymn for Epiphany, in five stanzas of six lines each, by Georg Weissel. It was first printed in 1642, set as a motet by Johannes Eccard. A version with an additional stanza is attributed to Johann Christoph Arnschwanger.

Hymnals indicate "In dich hab ich gehoffet, Herr" as the singing tune for both the five-stanza and six-stanza versions of the hymn. With this melody, Johann Sebastian Bach used its last stanza in Part V of his Christmas Oratorio.

== History ==
Weissel was the pastor at the Altrossgarten Church in Königsberg, Prussia, from 1623 until his death in 1635. The hymn was first published in the first volume of Preußische Festlieder (Prussian festive songs) in Elbing in 1642. It appeared in hymnals such as Das Vollständige und vermehrte Leipziger Gesang-Buch (1729) in the section for Epiphany, and with "In dich hab ich gehoffet, Herr" given as its tune. Arnschwanger's six-stanza version was likewise adopted as a hymn for Epiphany to be sung to "In dich hab ich gehoffet, Herr", in hymnals such as the 1734 Ulmisches Kirchen-Gesang-Buch.

=== Text ===
Weissel's hymn as published in Das Vollständige und vermehrte Leipziger Gesang-Buch (1729):

1.
Nun, liebe Seel, nun ist es Zeit,
wach auf, erweg mit Lust und Freud,
was Gott an uns gewendet,
seinn lieben Sohn
vons Himmel-Thron
ins Jammerthal er sendet.

2.
Nicht nur den Jüden bloß allein,
die seins Geblüts und Stammes seyn,
sondern auch allen Heyden
ist aufgericht
das ewge Licht,
erleuchtet sie mit Freuden.

3.
Der Heyden Erstling wunderlich
durch einen Stern er holt zu sich,
daß sie den Heyland schauen,
und ihren Herrn
in Andacht ehrn
mit gläubigem Vertrauen.

4.
O Jesu, unser Heyl und Licht:
halt über uns dein Angesicht,
mit deinen Strahlen walte,
und mein Gemüth
durch deine Güt
bey deinem Licht erhalte.

5.
Dein Glantz all Finsterniß verzehrt,
die trübe Nacht in Licht verkehrt,
leit uns auf deinen Wegen,
daß dein Gesicht
und herrlichs Licht
wir ewig schauen mögen.

=== Arnschwanger's version ===
A six-stanza version of the hymn is attributed to Johann Christoph Arnschwanger. Arnschwanger's additional stanza is inserted after the third stanza of Weissel's version, thus renumbering stanzas 4–5 of Weissel's hymn to 5–6 in this variant version:

4.
Nun, die ihr heiden seid geweßt
Begeht mit dank der heiden fest,
Laßt eure stimme klingen,
Laßt ihm zu ehr'n
Euch fröhlich hör'n
Mit loben und mit singen.

== Musical settings ==
=== Eccard's motet ===
In the first publication in 1642, the hymn appeared in a six-part motet setting (SSATTB) by Johannes Eccard. It was recorded in 2013 by the RIAS Kammerchor, conducted by Hans-Christoph Rademann, as part of a Christmas collection. The motet is part of the Advent collection of the vocal ensemble Singer Pur, published by Schott Music in 2015.

=== Based on the hymn tune "In dich hab ich gehoffet, Herr" ===
Zahn 2461c hymn tune
Chorale prelude In dich hab ich gehoffet, Herr, BWV 712 (2:25)
Performed by Jonathan Feucht on a Roland C-330 classic organ.

Johann Sebastian Bach used the last stanza of the hymn, "Dein Glanz all Finsternis verzehrt" (Your radiance destroys all darkness), as a chorale, movement 46 in Part V of his Christmas Oratorio. The stanza was also translated as "All darkness flies" and "Your radiance consumes all darkness". Bach used a melody which Sethus Calvisius composed in 1581 for the hymn "In dich hab ich gehoffet, Herr" (Zahn 2461c). Part V of the Christmas Oratorio was first performed on 2 January 1735, the Sunday after New Year's Day.

Bach also used the Zahn 2461 hymn tune in other compositions:

- Chorale prelude In dich hab ich gehoffet, Herr, BWV 712;
- "In dich hab ich gehoffet, Herr" (text: first stanza of the hymn with the same name), sixth movement (closing chorale) of the cantata Falsche Welt, dir trau ich nicht, BWV 52;
- "Mir hat die Welt trüglich gericht't" (text: fifth stanza of "In dich hab ich gehoffet, Herr"), 32nd movement (chorale) of St Matthew Passion, BWV 244;
- "Glorie, Lob, Ehr und Herrlichkeit" (text: seventh and last stanza of "In dich hab ich gehoffet, Herr"), fourth movement (closing chorus) of the cantata Gottes Zeit ist die allerbeste Zeit, BWV 106.
