= Übers Gebirg Maria geht =

- Motet by Johannes Eccard
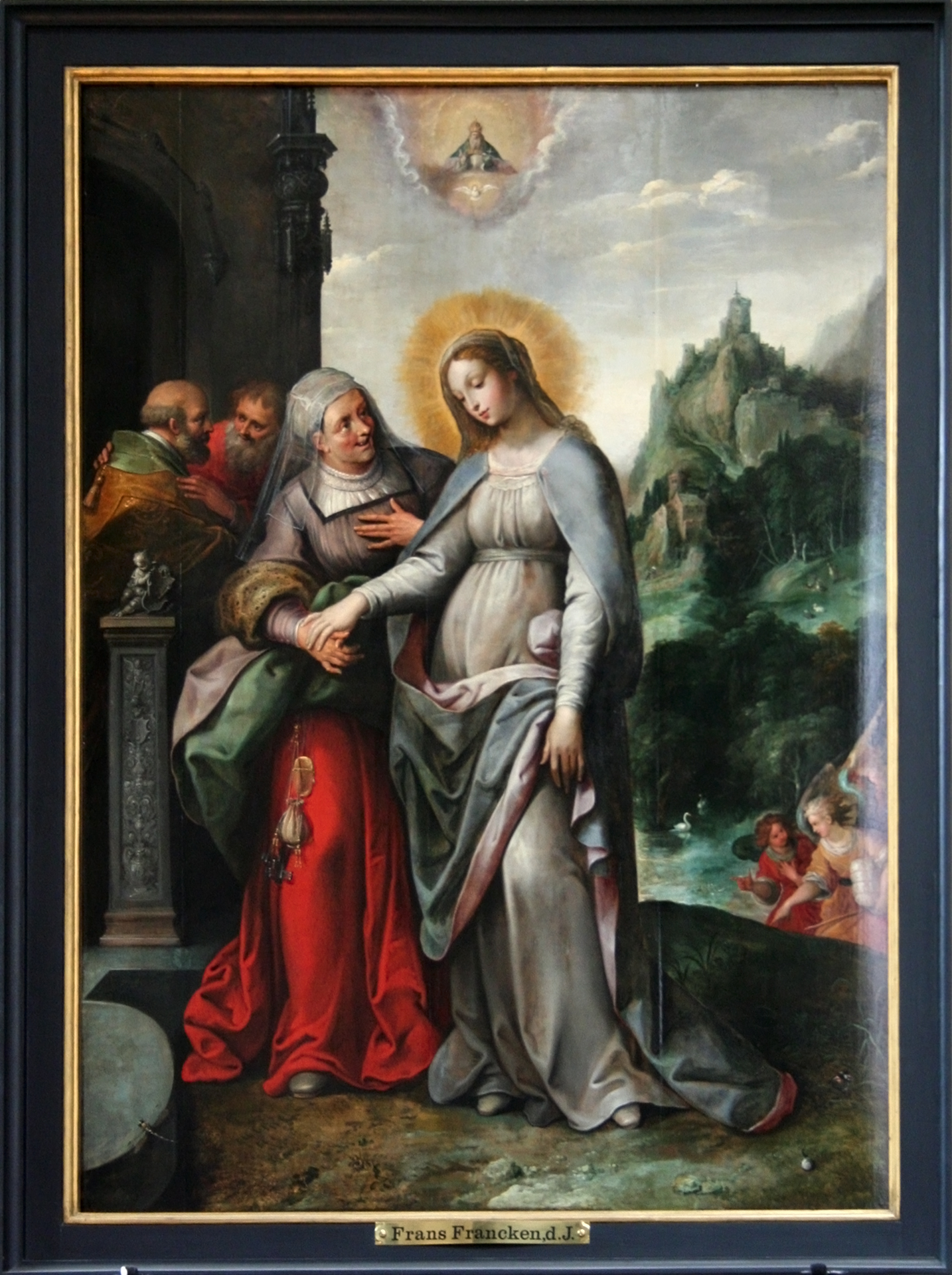
- De Visitatie (the visitation), topic of the motet, by Frans Francken
- Key: E-flat major
- Text: paraphrase of the Magnificat by Ludwig Helmbold
- Language: German
- Scoring: SSATB choir

Übers Gebirg Maria geht (Over the mountains Mary goes) is a sacred motet by the Renaissance composer and musician Johannes Eccard, who wrote it on a German text by Ludwig Helmbold in two stanzas. The first stanza is a rephrasing of the biblical story of the visit of Mary to Elisabeth, ending in Mary's song of praise known as the Magnificat. The second stanza speaks to present-day listeners, urging them to follow Mary's example and go over the mountains, be inspired, support each other, and sing the Magnificat.

Thirty-three years after Eccard's death, the motet was included in the collection Preußische Festlieder II, published in Berlin in 1644. Originally intended for the feast of the Visitation, it is now often performed during Advent.

== Background ==
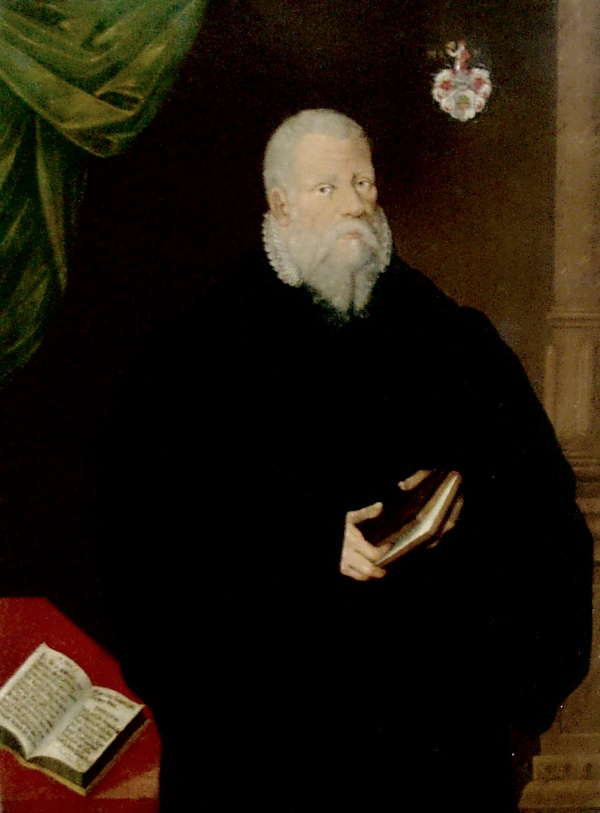
Ludwig Helmbold, the author of the text, oil painting in Divi Blasii

The author of the text was Ludwig Helmbold, who was a minister at the Marienkirche in Mühlhausen from 1571. Eccard, who was born in Mühlhausen and returned there during the winter of 1573–74 when he was twenty, became acquainted with Helmbold and set many of his texts to music during the course of his life. Helmboldt's poem in two stanzas is based on the biblical narration from the Gospel of Luke of the visit of Mary to her relative Elisabeth (Luke 1:39–56). Both stanzas end in a short version of the Magnificat. The scholar Schalom Ben-Chorin argues that a young woman educated at the synagogue and celebrating Jewish feasts would have been able to know the verses from the Thora which form the Magnificat.

Mary is depicted as traveling over the mountains ("Übers Gebirg"). Elisabeth greets her as the Lord's mother ("des Herren Mutter"), Mary became cheerful and sang ("Maria ward fröhlich und sang"). At this point a short version of the Magnificat forms the chorus of both stanzas, which follows the beginning closely but then stresses, that he is my Saviour ("Er ist mein Heiland"), who should be feared and who will always be merciful ("fürchtet ihn, er will allzeit barmherzig sein"). The second stanza encourages listeners to follow the example, and also go to the mountains and tell each other, inspired by the spirit (the chorus): My soul magnifies the Lord ("Mein Seel den Herrn erhebet").

== Music ==
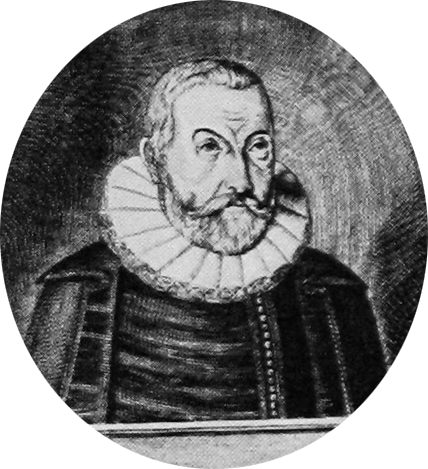
Johannes Eccard, the composer

Johannes Eccard was a student of Orlando di Lasso. Eccard was also "one of the principal Protestant composers of chorale motets" in his time—Übers Gebirg Maria geht was one of his chorale motets, and was published posthumously in Preußische Festlieder II, the second of two such collections published in 1642 and 1644, which featured works of Eccard and his student Johann Stobaeus for five to eight voices. These chorale motets are said to have demonstrated that Eccard "was a 'true disciple of the world-famous and celebrated Orlandi [Lassus]'", and those such as Übers Gebirg Maria geht "reflect the intrinsic warmth of Helmbold's verse".

Eccard set the piece in E-flat major and scored it for five vocal parts (soprano 1 and 2, alto, tenor and bass. In the beginning, the lower four voices are mostly in homophony, while the top soprano enters later. The beginning of the chorus ("Mein Seel den Herrn erhebet") is sung by the sopranos and tenor, joined by the other voices for "mein Geist sich Gottes freuet" (my spirit rejoices in God). In the following "Er ist mein Heiland", all five voices are in homophony for the only time in the composition. The fear of God is expressed in low register, while a descending line, which the voices render in imitation, is an image for the concluding mercy.

He composed the motet for the feast of the Visitation. It is now often performed during Advent and recorded in collections of Advent hymns and Christmas carols.
