= Johann Friedrich Schultz =

German mathematician and theologian

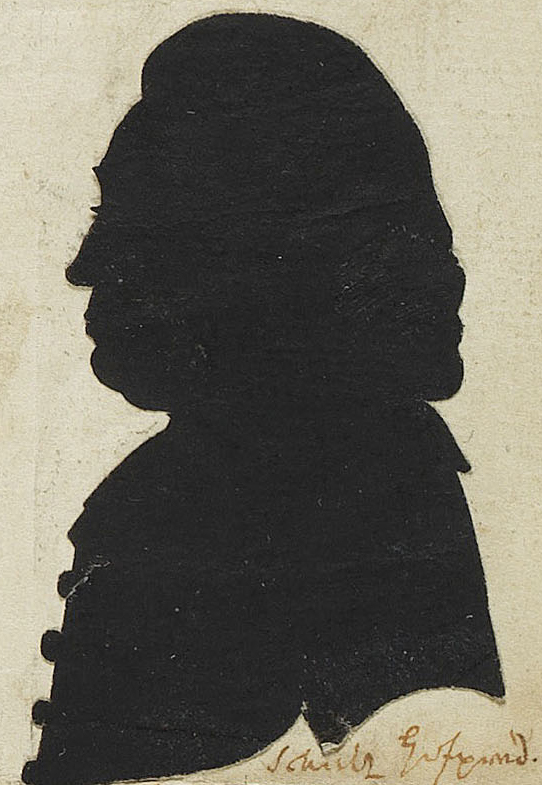
Johann Friedrich Schultz (Silhouette)

Johann Friedrich Schultz, also known as Johann Schultz (11 June 1739, Mühlhausen – 27 June 1805, Königsberg), was a German Enlightenment Protestant theologian, mathematician and philosopher. He is best known as a close personal friend and trusted expositor (a person who explains complicated ideas) of Immanuel Kant. Johann Schultz was a Hofprediger (second court chaplain) and Professor of Mathematics at the University of Königsberg.

== Personal life ==
Schultz studied theology and mathematics at the Collegium Fridericianum at Königsberg University, where Immanuel Kant lectured, and matriculated on 24 September 1756. Ludwig Borowski, one of Kant's early biographers stated that Schultz was one of the best students of Kant, and this is often repeated in the literature, but Schultz denied ever having attended a lecture.

Schultz initially worked as a private tutor within Königsberg before undertaking employment as a pastor in Starkenberg between 1766 and 1769, taking similar employment at Löwenhagen between 1769 and 1775 before returning in 1775, to Königsberg to work as a Deacon at the Altroßgarten church. On 6 July 1775 he received his magister degree and on 2 August 1775, he took his examination for promotion of habilitation with a disputation on acoustics. He worked as a lecturer over the winter of 1775 and 1776. In 1777, he was made Hofprediger at Königsberg castle church.

Schultz's appointment as professor of mathematics to the government on 11 August 1786 was recommended by the Königsberg senate, at the same time that Kant was serving as rector at Königsberg. As a professor of mathematics, he had a duty to provide lectures, which he did in arithmetic and geometry in the summer, and trigonometry and astronomy in the winter. Apart from a lecture series in metaphysics during the first half of his second year, and pedagogy that each professor took turns offering, Schultz offered mathematics lectures, focusing on pure and applied mathematics: Arithmetic, Geometry, Trigonometry, Algebra, finite and infinite analysis, Astronomy, Mechanics and Optics. Schultz used Christian Wolff's Treatise of Algebra and Leonhard Euler Elements of Algebra (French: Élémens ďalgebre) and his own text for arithmetic, geometry and trigonometry.

Schultz first met the philosopher Johann Gottlieb Fichte between July and October 1791 when Schultz helped Fichte acquire a teaching position close to Danzig. Fichte described Schultz in correspondence as:

He has an angular Prussian face, but honesty and kindness shine forth from it

They continued to write to each other to discuss ideas, even when Fichte left Danzig. The relationship between Schultz and Fichte was more convoluted than it would otherwise be, as Johanna Eleonore, née Büttner (1751–1795), Schultz's wife, was romantically linked to Fichte. Fichte left Königsberg sooner than he initially planned.

Schultz became friends with Kant late in life.

== Literature ==
Schultz published poetry in his early life, and several Latin texts on theology in 1787 and 1791. However, most of his literature was concerned with creation of mathematical texts, including the explanation of Immanuel Kant's new critical system (critical philosophy, transcendental idealism). Schultz wrote and successfully published several mathematical texts including Foundation of Pure Mathematics in 1790, a Brief System of Mathematics first published in 1797 with new editions in 1805 and 1806. However most of his interest was in the work concerning the Parallel Lines Postulate with papers published in 1780, 1784 and 1786. In 1788 he wrote Attempt at a precise theory of the infinite (German: Versuch einer genauen Theorie des Unendlichen) which was an entrant for the 1786 Berlin Academy prize essay question asking for a:

clear and precise theory of mathematical infinity

Although Schultz was unsuccessful in this entry, the essay preceded certain features of Georg Cantor's theory of transfinite numbers. The work, although similar to work undertaken by the mathematicians Wenceslaus Johann Gustav Karsten, Georg Simon Klügel, and Johann Heinrich Lambert, would eventually result in the development of non-Euclidean geometry.

== Bibliography ==
- (anon.), Review of Kant's Inaugural Dissertation, in the Königsbergsche Gelehrte und Politische Zeitungen (22–25 November 1771). Reprinted in Reinhard Brandt (op cit.), pp. 59–66. Transl. by James C. Morrison (op cit.), pp. 163–70.
- Vorläufige Anzeige des entdeckten Beweises für die Theorie der Parallellinen (Königsberg, 1780). 2nd ed.: 1786.
- Entdeckte Theorie der Parallelen, nebst einer Untersuchung über den Ursprung ihrer bisherigen Schwierigkeit (Königsberg: D. C. Kanter, 1784).
- Erläuterungen über des Herrn Professor Kant Critik der reinen Vernunft (Königsberg: C. G. Dengel, 1784). 2nd ed.: 1791. Transl. by James C. Morrison (op cit.), pp. 3–141.
- (anon.), Review of J. A. H. Ulrich, Institutiones logicae et metaphysicae scholae suae scripsit (Jena: Cröker, 1785), in Allgemeine Literatur-Zeitung (13 December 1785), pp. 247–49. Translated into English in Brigitte Sassen, tr. and ed., Kant’s Early Critics (Cambridge: Cambridge University Press, 2000), pp. 210–14.
- Darstellung der vollkommenen Evidenz und Schärfe seiner Theorie der Parallelen (Königsberg: G. C. Hartung, 1786).
- Prüfung der Kantischen Critik der reinen Vernunft, 2 vols. (Königsberg: Hartung, 1789; Nicolovius 1792). Reprinted in Aetas Kantiana, 1968

=== Other publications ===
- Reflections on the Empty space. Betrachtungen über den leeren Raum. Königsberg, 1758
- De geometria acustica seu solius auditus ope exercenda. Königsberg, 1775
- De geometria acustica nec non de ratione 0:0 seu basi calculi differentialis. Königsberg, 1787
- Elementa theologiae popularis theoreticae. 1787
- Attempt at a precise theory of the infinite. Versuch einer genauen Theorie des Unendlichen. Königsberg, 1788
- Rudements of Pure Mathematics. Anfangsgründe der reinen Mathesis. Königsberg. 1790
- Elements of Practical Theology. Elementa theologiae practicae. 1791
- Defense of critical letters to Mr Emanuel Kant through his critique of pure reason, primarily against the Bornischen attacks. Vertheidigung der kritischen Briefe an Herrn Emanuel Kant über seine Kritik der reinen Vernunft, vornehmlich gegen die Bornischen Angriffe. Göttingen, 1792
- A Brief Concept of Mathematics. Kurzer Lehrbegriff der Mathematik. Königsberg, 1797, 1805, 1806
1. Bd. Kurzer Lehrbegriff der Arithmetik, Geometrie, Trigonometrie und Landmesskunst.
2. Bd. Kurzer Lehrbegriff der mechanischen und optischen Wissenschaften.
3. Popular Foundations of Astronomy. Bd. Populäre Anfangsgründe der Astronomie.
- Very light and short development of some of the most important mathematical theories. Sehr leichte und Kurze Entwickelung einiger der wichtigsten mathematischen Theorien. Königsberg, 1803
- Foundations of pure mechanics, which are the foundations of pure natural science. Anfangsgründe der reinen Mechanik, die zugleich die Anfangsgründe der reinen Naturwissenschaft sind. Königsberg, 1804
