= Johann Christoph Arnschwanger =

Lutheran pastor and hymn writer (b. 1625, d. 1696)

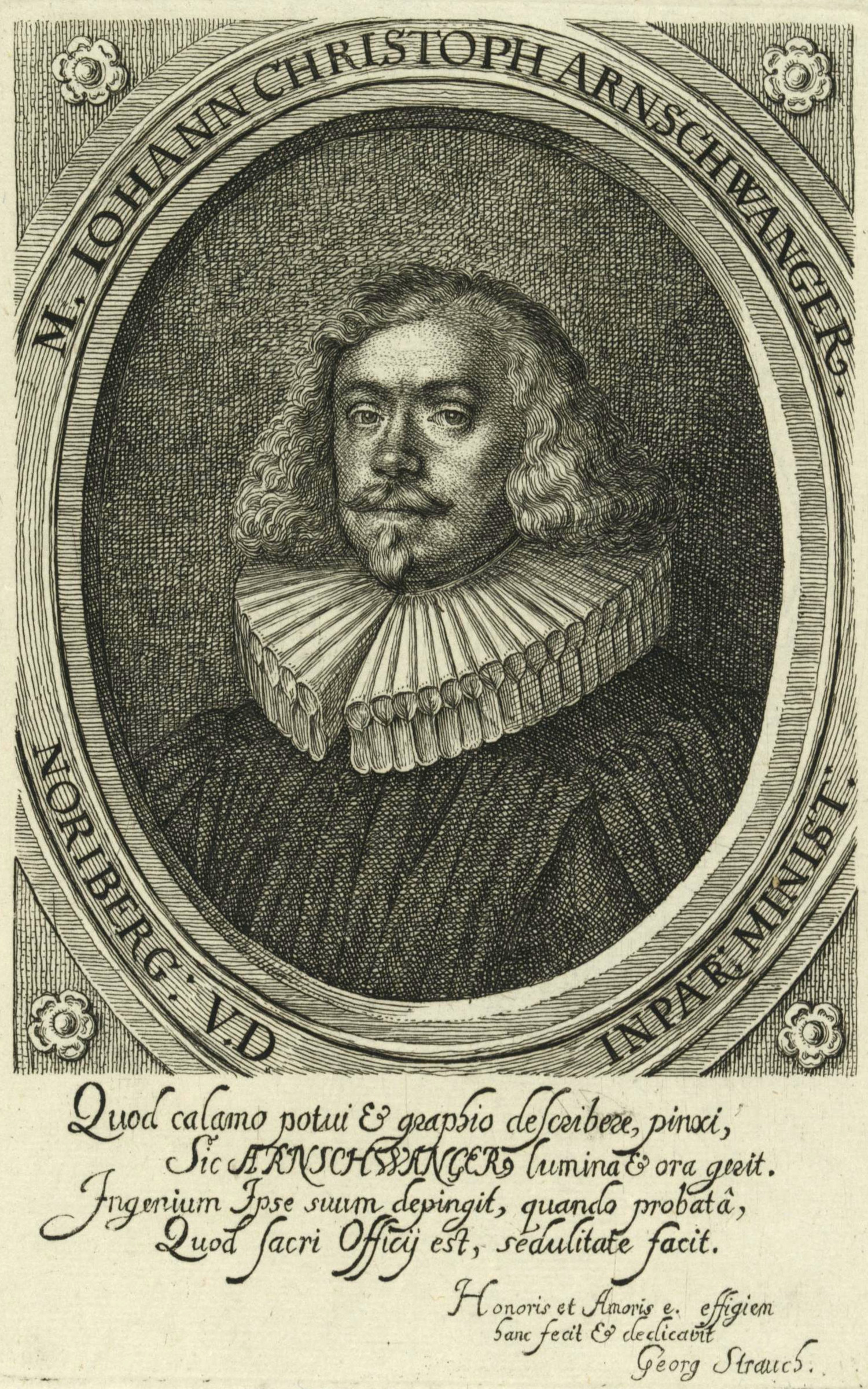
- Born: December 28, 1625
- Died: December 10, 1696 (aged 70)
- Occupation(s): Pastor and hymn writer

Johann Christoph Arnschwanger (December 28, 1625 - December 10, 1696) was a German Lutheran pastor and hymn writer.

== Life ==
Arnschwanger was the son of the Nuremberg merchant Georg Arnschwanger and Margarete Rosenhart. After attending school at the Egidien Gymnasium in Nuremberg, he studied theology in Altdorf near Nuremberg from 1644 onwards. In 1647, he moved to the University of Jena and later moved again to the University of Helmstedt where he successfully completed his studies, and under Professor Georg Calixt, he was awarded a master's degree in 1650.

The following year Arnschwanger was appointed vicar in Nuremberg. In 1652, he became a deacon at St. Egidien, followed by becoming a preacher at St. Walpurgis in 1654, a deacon again in 1959, and in 1690, the archdeacon at St. Lorenz.

In 1675, Duke August of Saxony-Weissenfels admitted him to the Fruchtbringende Gesellschaft (Fruitbearing Society). He gave him the society's name, the Innocent, and the motto, always remain pure. His emblem was the white wild thyme and his entry is found in the Köthen society book of the Fruchtbringende Gesellschaft under No. 853.

Arnschwanger's oeuvre includes nearly 400 sacred songs. He is known as a contributor of songs to works by the Nuremberg theologian Johann Michael Dilherr, the epiphany song Nun, liebe Seel, nun ist es Zeit, wach auf (Now, dear soul, it is time to wake up), the Easter song Auf, ihr Christen, lasst uns singen (Up, Christians, let us sing), the song for the church consecration festival Kommt her, ihr Christen, voller Freud (Come here, Christians, full of joy) and the song for the warning against damnation Zwei Ort, o Mensch, hast du vor dir, so lang du lebst auf Erden (Two places, O man, you have before you, as long as you live on earth).

At the age of almost 71, Arnschwanger died in Nuremberg on December 10, 1696.

== Work ==
- Memory of Secular Religious Peace, 1655
- New Spiritual Songs, 1659 (1712)
- Instruction to godliness, 1663
- Sacred Psalms and Christian Psalms, 1680

== Literature ==
- Georg Andreas Will: Bibliotheca Norica Williana or Critical Index of All Writings, which concern the city of Nuremberg, Vol. I, Johann Paul Meyer, Altdorf 1772, pp. 43 ff; Vol. V, Johann Paul Meyer, Altdorf 1775, pp. 41 ff.
- Karl Goedeke: Outline of the history of German poetry from the sources. 2nd ed. Ehlermann, Leipzig 1887, vol. 3. p. 191 f.
- Albert Fischer, Wilhelm Tümpel: The German Protestant Church Song of the Seventeenth Century. Volume V, Bertelsmann, Gütersloh 1911, pp. 265–298.
- Albert Friedrich Wilhelm Fischer: Kirchenlieder-Lexicon. Hymnological-literary references to about 4500 of the most important and widespread church songs of all times in alphabetical order, together with an overview of the song poets. Volume 2: The songs from the letters K - Z and the alphabetical index of the poets. Perthes, Gotha 1879.
- Paul Pressel: Arnschwanger, Johann Christoph. In: General German Biography (ADB). Vol. 1, Duncker & Humblot, Leipzig 1875, p. 597.
- Karl Schornbaum: Arnschwanger, Johann Christoph. In: New German Biography (NDB). Vol. 1, Duncker & Humblot, Berlin 1953, ISBN 3-428-00182-6, p. 394.
