= Arnold Lyongrün =

German painter

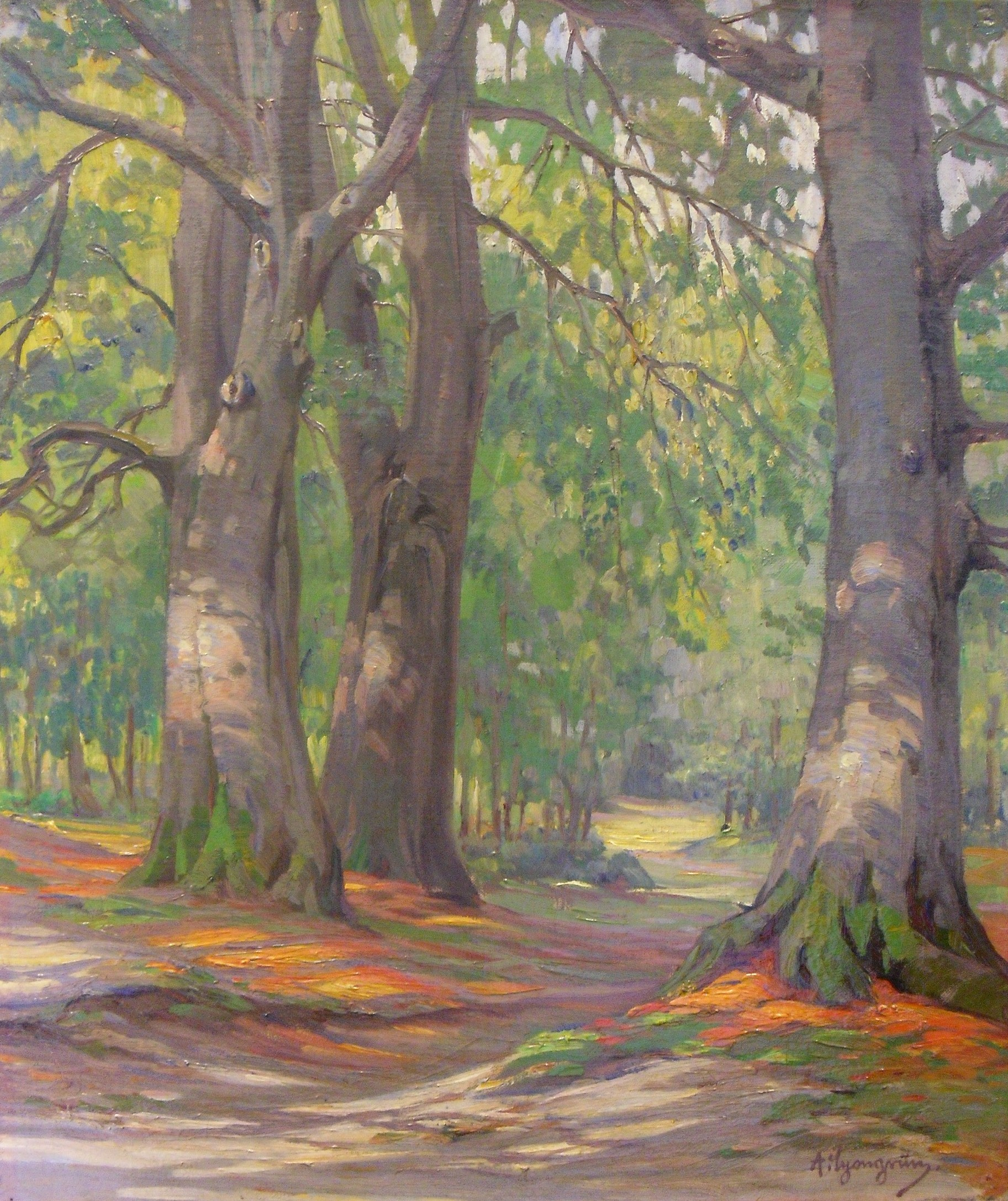
Arnold Lyongrün: Beech Forest (1899)

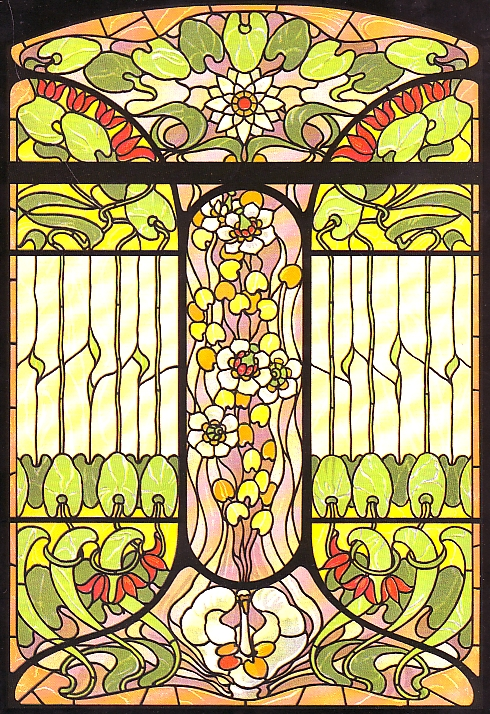
Arnold Lyongrün: Proposal for an Art Nouveau window (Berlin, New York, 1900)

Ernst Arnold Lyongrün (1871–1935) was a German practitioner of the Jugendstil or Art Nouveau style of decorative arts and a painter in the Impressionistic mode.

== Early life ==
Lyongrün was born October 2, 1871, in Domnau, Province of Prussia (now Domnovo, Russia). He grew up during the Gründerzeit boom of Imperial Germany, studying in Königsberg (now Kaliningrad, Russia) and at the Staatliche Akademie für Kunst und Kunstgewerbe Breslau (now Wrocław, Poland). Thereafter he studied at the Académie Julian in Paris under French artists Jules Joseph Lefebvre and Tony Robert-Fleury, and undertook student journeys around France, Austria and Italy.

Beginning in 1898, Lyongrün lived and worked in the Hamburg area, and in 1907 he became a teacher at the State Academy of Art in Hamburg. During the First World War he was drafted into the Germany Army. Lyongrün survived the war and in 1919 became an independent painter. He became a member of the Hamburg Artists Society (founded 1920) and subsequently a member of the German National Association of Visual Artists (Reichsverband Bildender Künstler Deutschlands). A few years later he was a member of the artists colony at Ahrenshoop on the Darss Peninsula at the Baltic Sea, in Hither Pomerania.

== Career ==
During his sojourn in France, the young Lyongrün was inspired by the Art Nouveau movement exemplified by the École de Nancy ("School of Nancy"). He published a number of patterns for decorative arts and crafts, among them Decorative Motifs from the Natural World (1899) and New Ideas for Decorative Art (1901). These works are held by the Metropolitan Museum of Art, New York.

In art history, Lyongrün is regarded primarily as a landscape painter and a marine artist. His paintings include scenes from the Black Forest, the Lüneburg Heath, the low-lying environs of Hamburg and the shores of the Baltic Sea. He also painted a few portraits. Early exhibitions of Lyongrün's works were staged in Hamburg in 1911 and 1919.

== Gallery ==
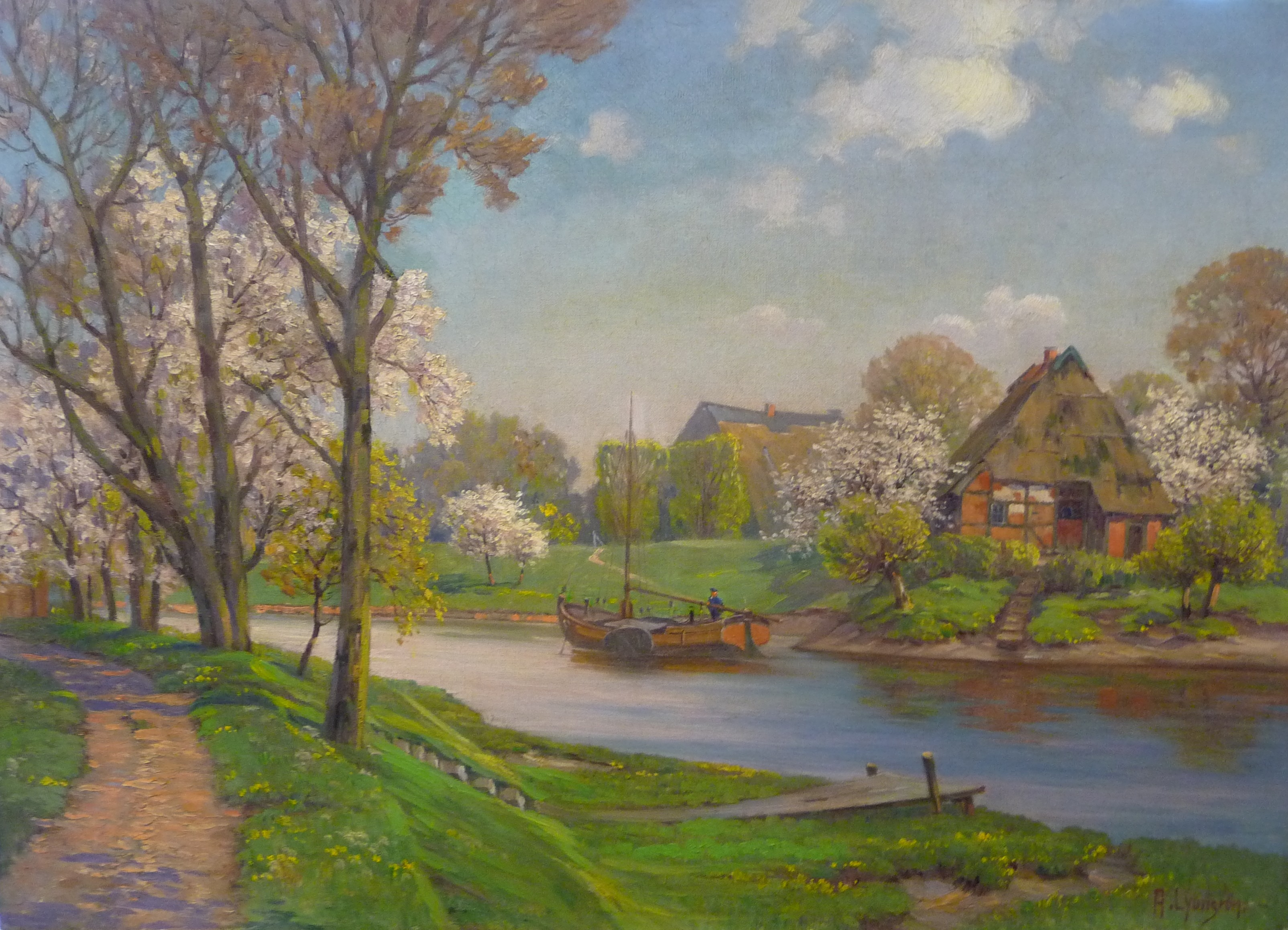
Spring on the Lühe (1904)

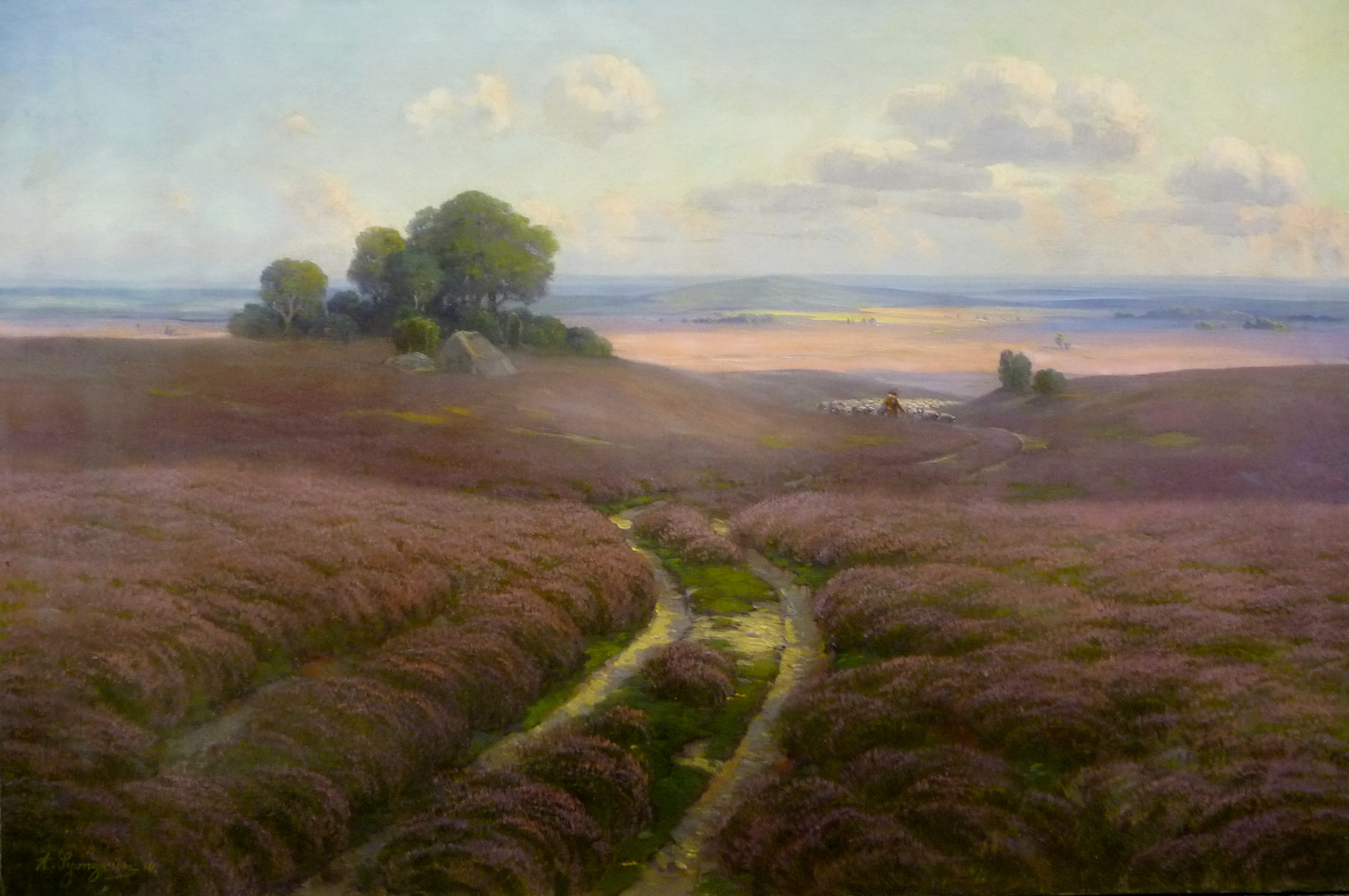
The Blooming Heath (1910)

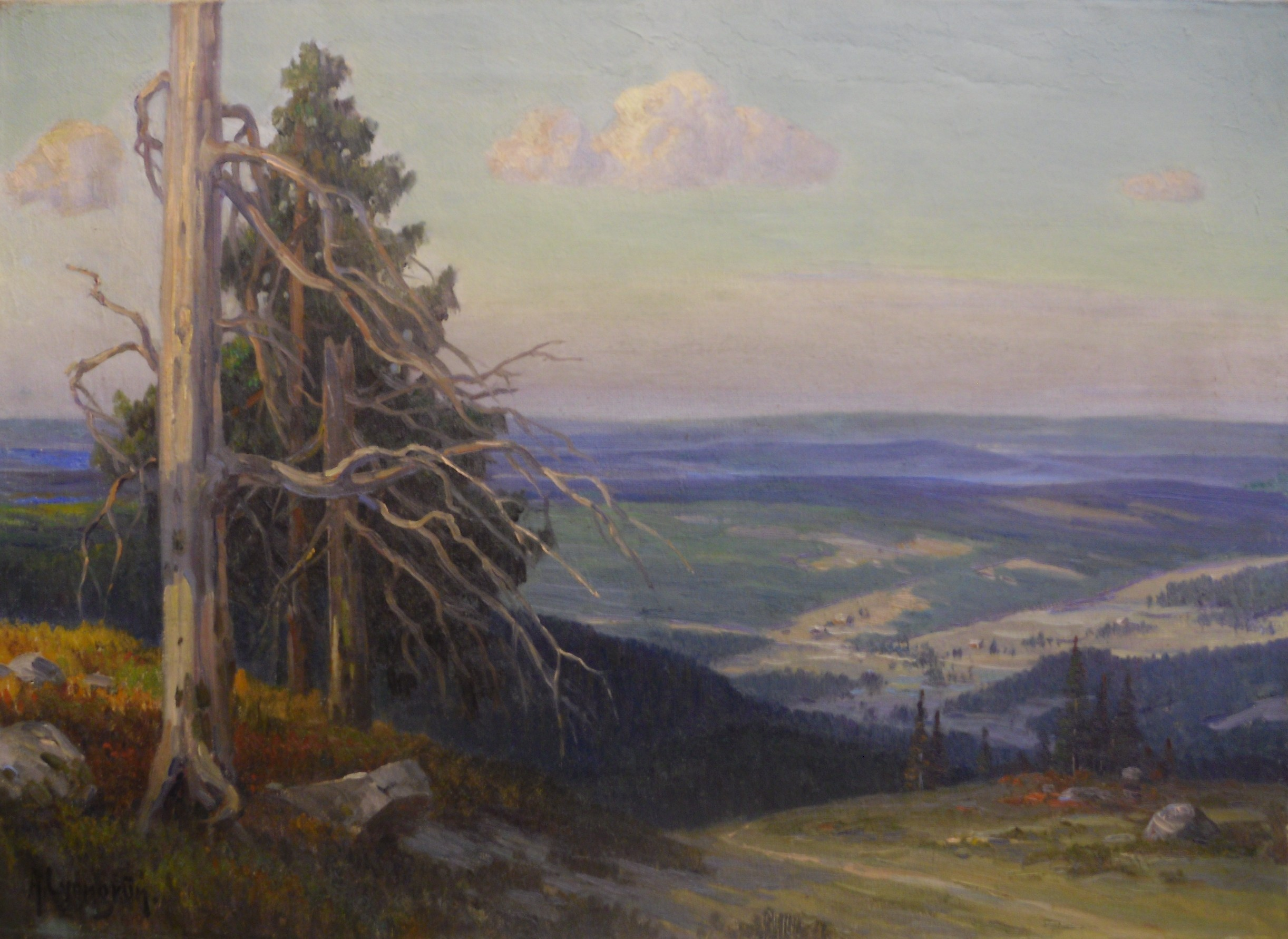
Feldberg, Black Forest (1910)

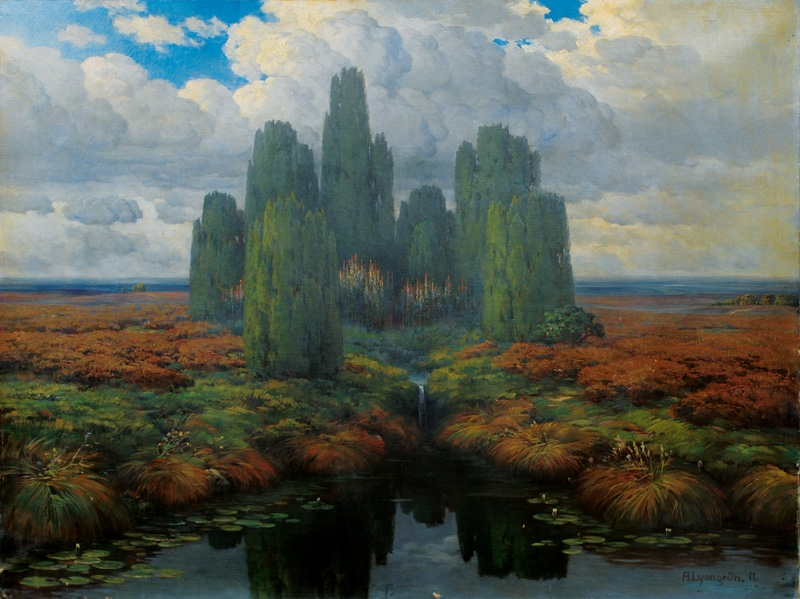
The Source (1911)

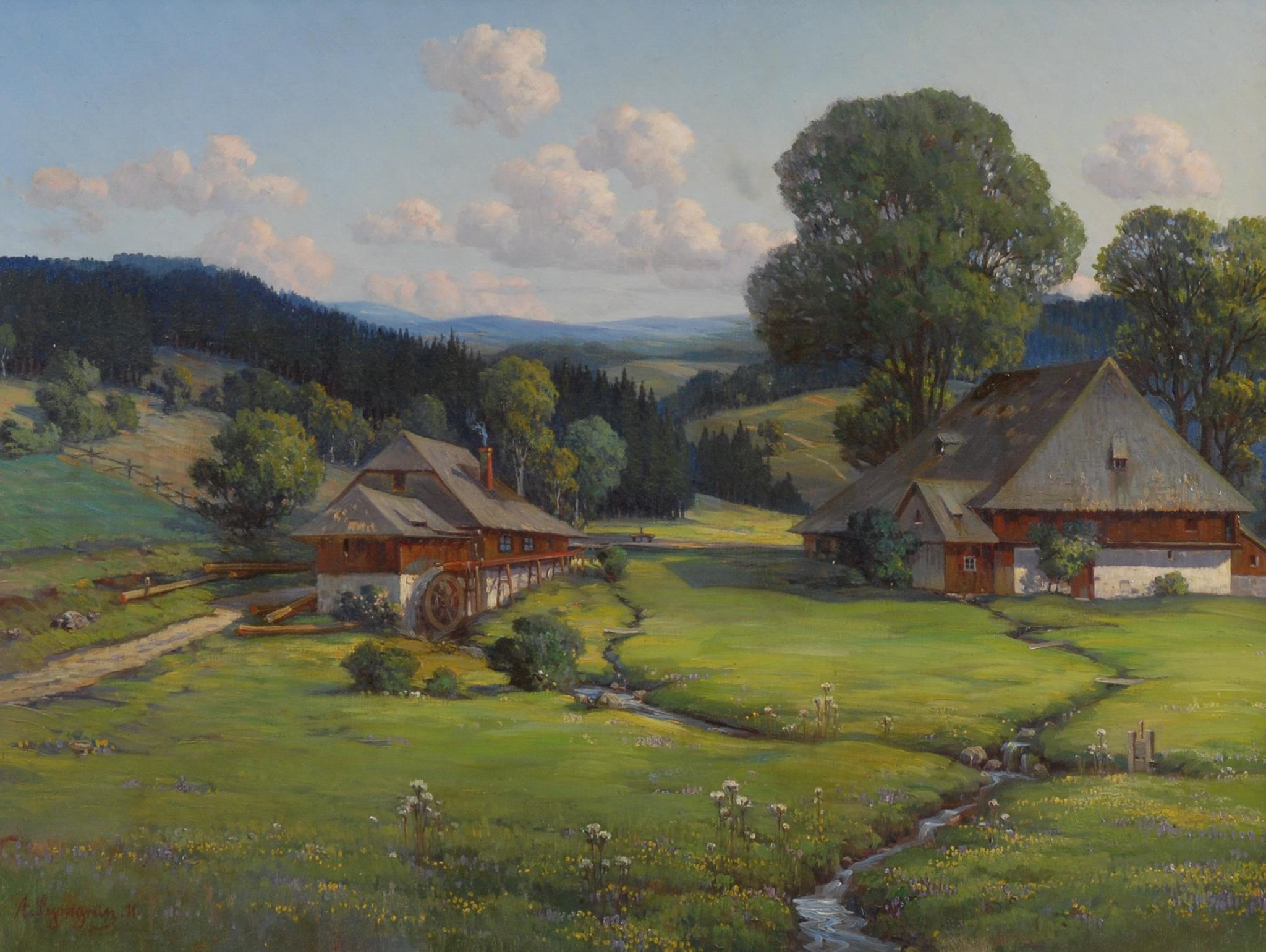
Mill on the Titisee (1912)

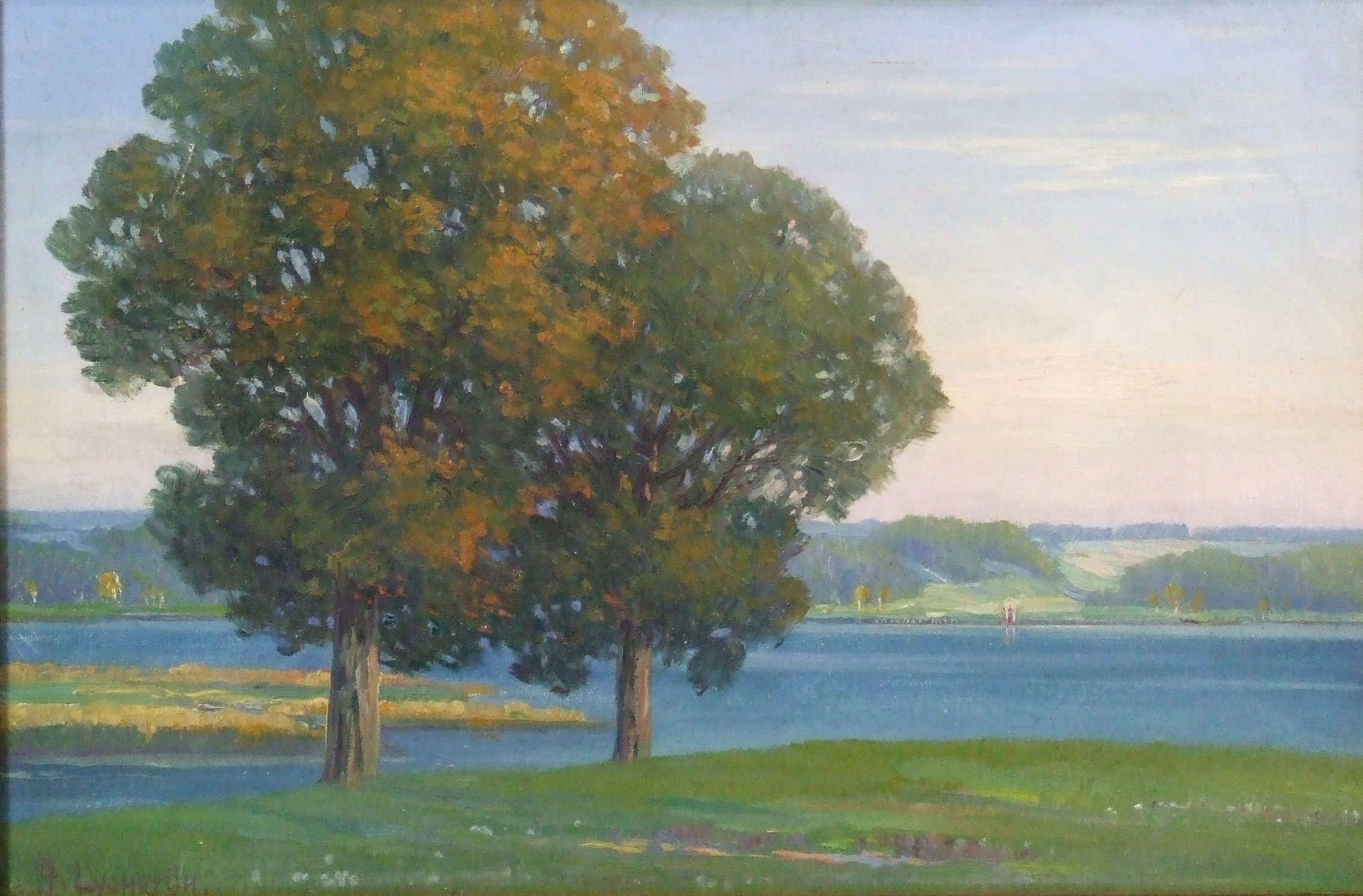
Oaks on the Kellersee (1919)

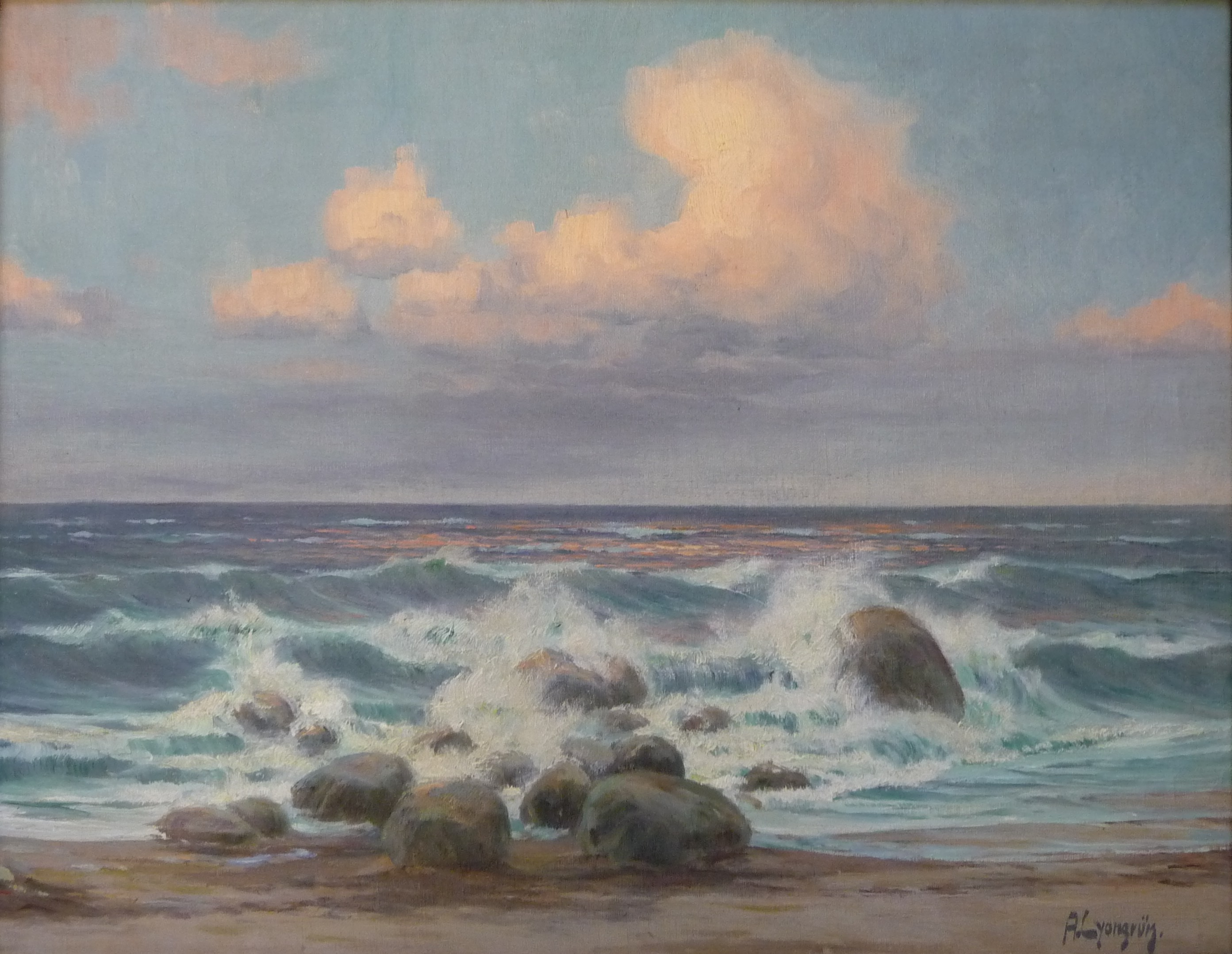
Evening on the Baltic (1921)

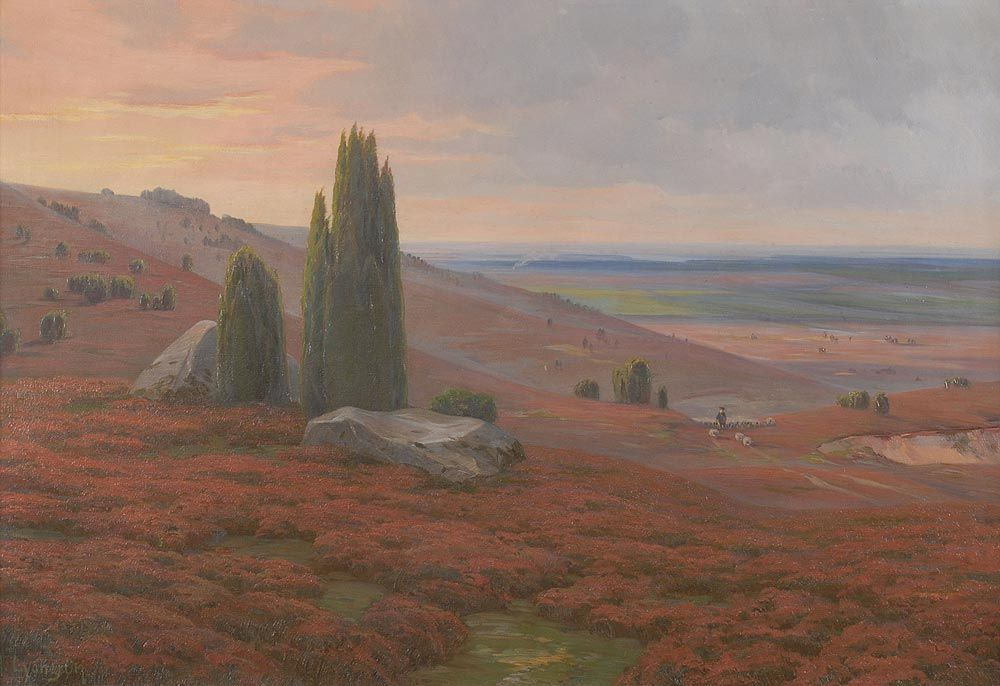
Heath Landscape near Wilsede

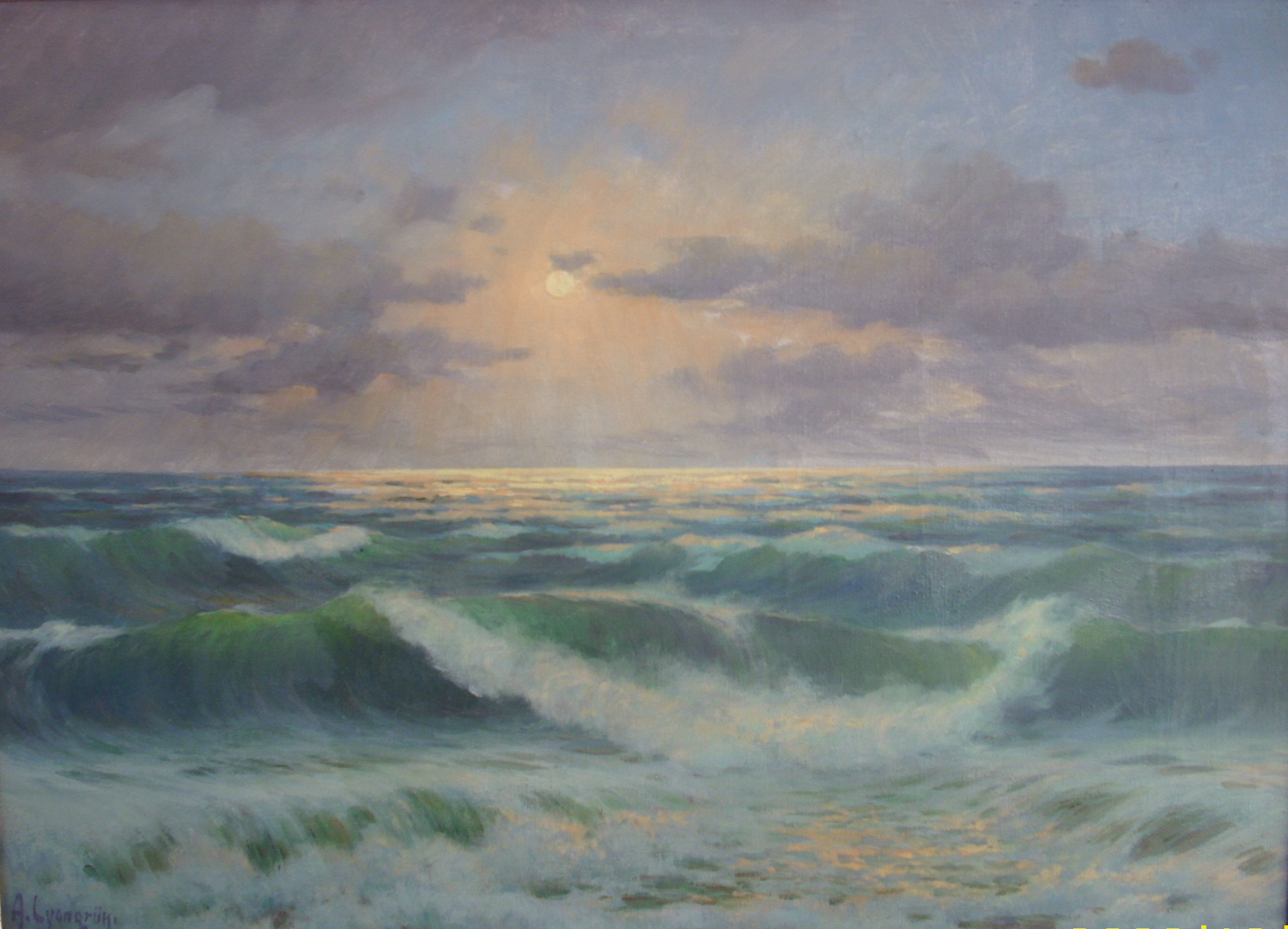
Baltic Sea Surf (1925)

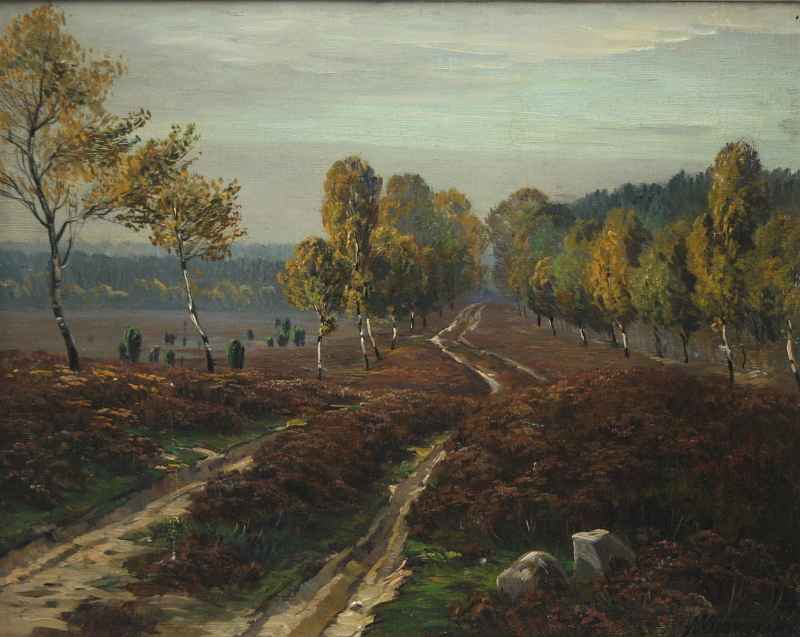
Track, Lüneburg Heath

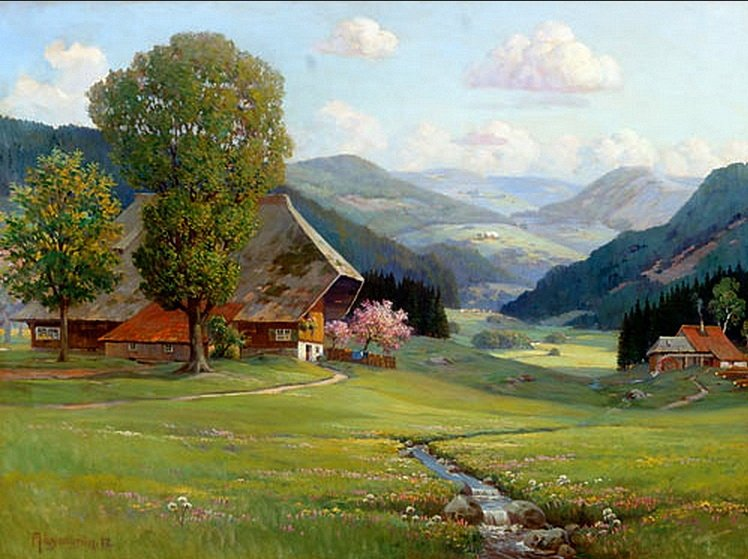
Spring, Black Forest (1912)

== Publications ==
- Arnold Lyongrün: Eine Sammlung naturalistischer Motive. Verlag Bernhard Friedrich Voigt, Leipzig 1898
- Arnold Lyongrün: Neue Ornamente. Verlag Ernst Wasmuth, Berlin 1899–1902
- Arnold Lyongrün: Vorbilder für Kunstverglasungen im Style der Neuzeit. Verlag Hessling, Berlin / New York 1900
- Arnold Lyongrün: Neue Ideen für dekorative Kunst und das Kunstgewerbe, Verlag Kanter und Mohr, Berlin 1903
- Arnold Lyongrün: Masterpieces of Art Nouveau, Stained Glass Design, 91 Motifs in full color. Verlag Dover Pubn, 1989
- Arnold Lyongrün: From Nature to Ornament, Organic Forms in the Art Nouveau Style. Dover Pictorial Archive Series, 2010

== Sources ==
- Brockhaus' Kleines Konversations-Lexikon, Bd. 1. 5. Auflage, Leipzig 1911, S. 687.
- Hans W. Singer (Hrsg.): Allgemeines Künstlerlexikon. Leben und Werke der berühmtesten bildenden Künstler, Bd 6. Rütten & Loening Verlag, Frankfurt/M. 1922.
- Ernst Rump (ed.), Kay Rump (pub.), Maike Bruhns (pub.): Der Neue Rump. Lexikon der Bildenden Künstler Hamburgs, Altonas und der näheren Umgebung. 2. Auflage. Verlag Wachtholz, Neumünster 2005, ISBN 3-529-02792-8.
- Paul Pfisterer: Signaturlexikon. Walter de Gruyter, Berlin / New York 1999, p. 425
