= Domnovo =

Domnovo Домново
- Settlement
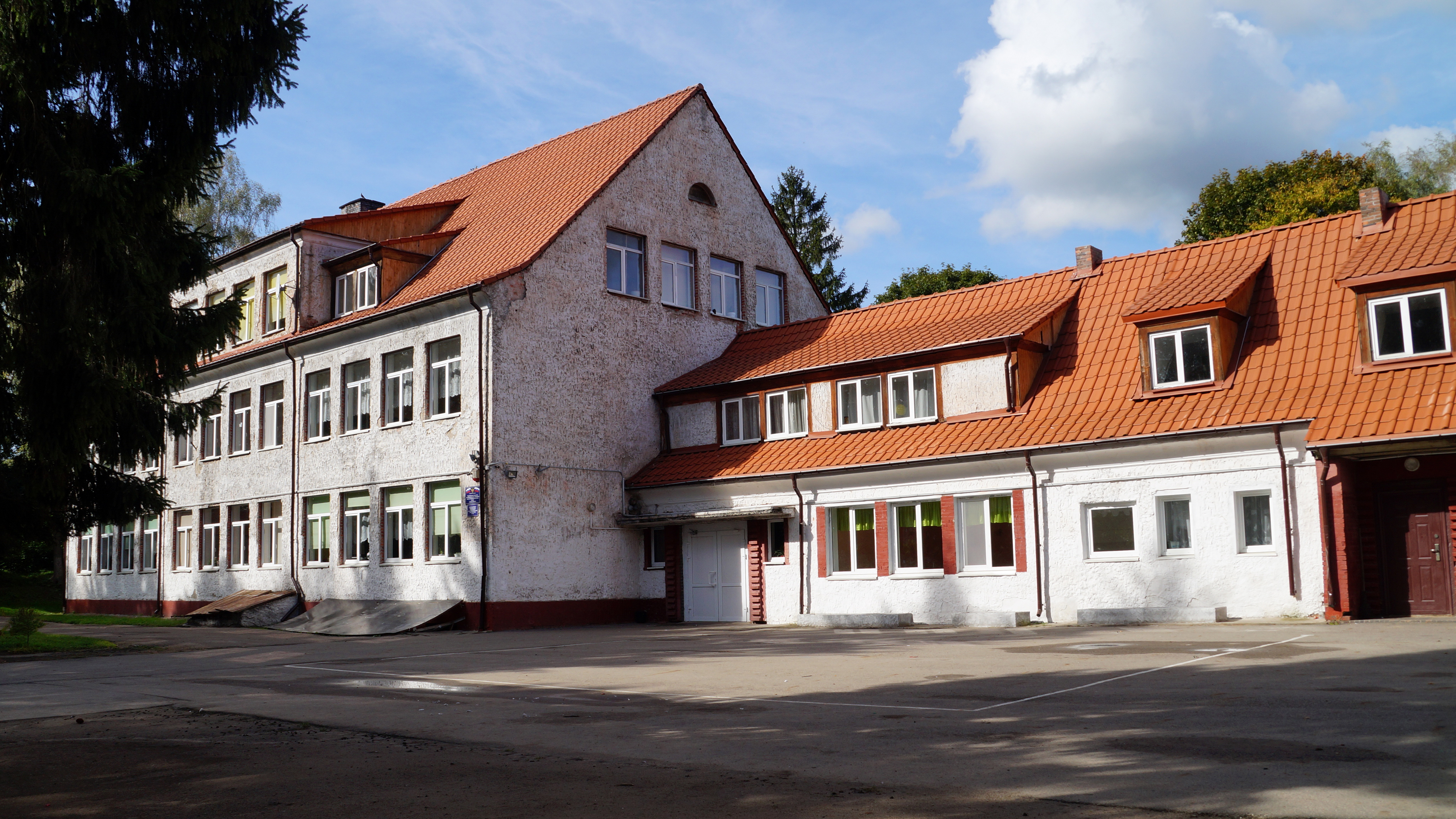
- School in Domnovo

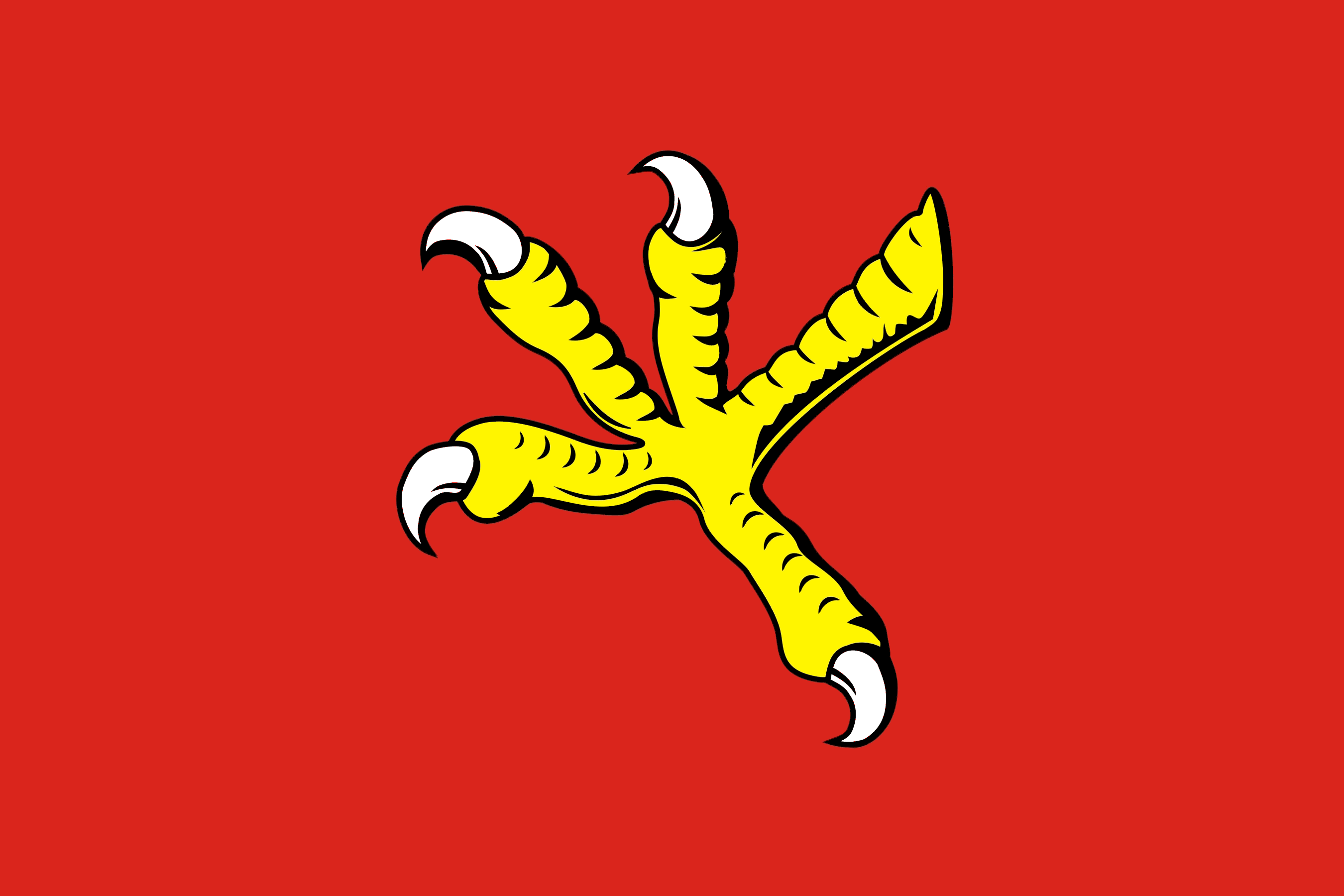
- Flag
- Interactive map of Domnovo
- Location of Domnovo Domnovo (Kaliningrad Oblast)
- Coordinates: 54°26′N 20°50′E
- Country: Russia
- Federal subject: Kaliningrad Oblast
- Administrative district: Pravdinsky District
- Rural okrugSelsoviet: Domnovsky Rural Okrug
- Founded: 1300
- Elevation: 76 m (249 ft)

Population (2010 Census)
  - Total: 820
  - Estimate (2010): 820 (0%)
- Time zone: UTC+2 (MSK–1)
- Postal code: 238404
- Dialing code: +7 40157
- OKTMO ID: 27719000431

Domnovo (Russian: До́мново; German: Domnau; Polish: Domnowo; Lithuanian: Dumnava) is a rural locality (a settlement) in Pravdinsky District of Kaliningrad Oblast, Russia, located near the Poland–Russia border, about 40 kilometers (25 mi) southeast of Kaliningrad, the administrative center of the oblast, and 12 kilometers (7.5 mi) west of Pravdinsk, the administrative center of the district. Population: 820 (2010 Census).

== History ==
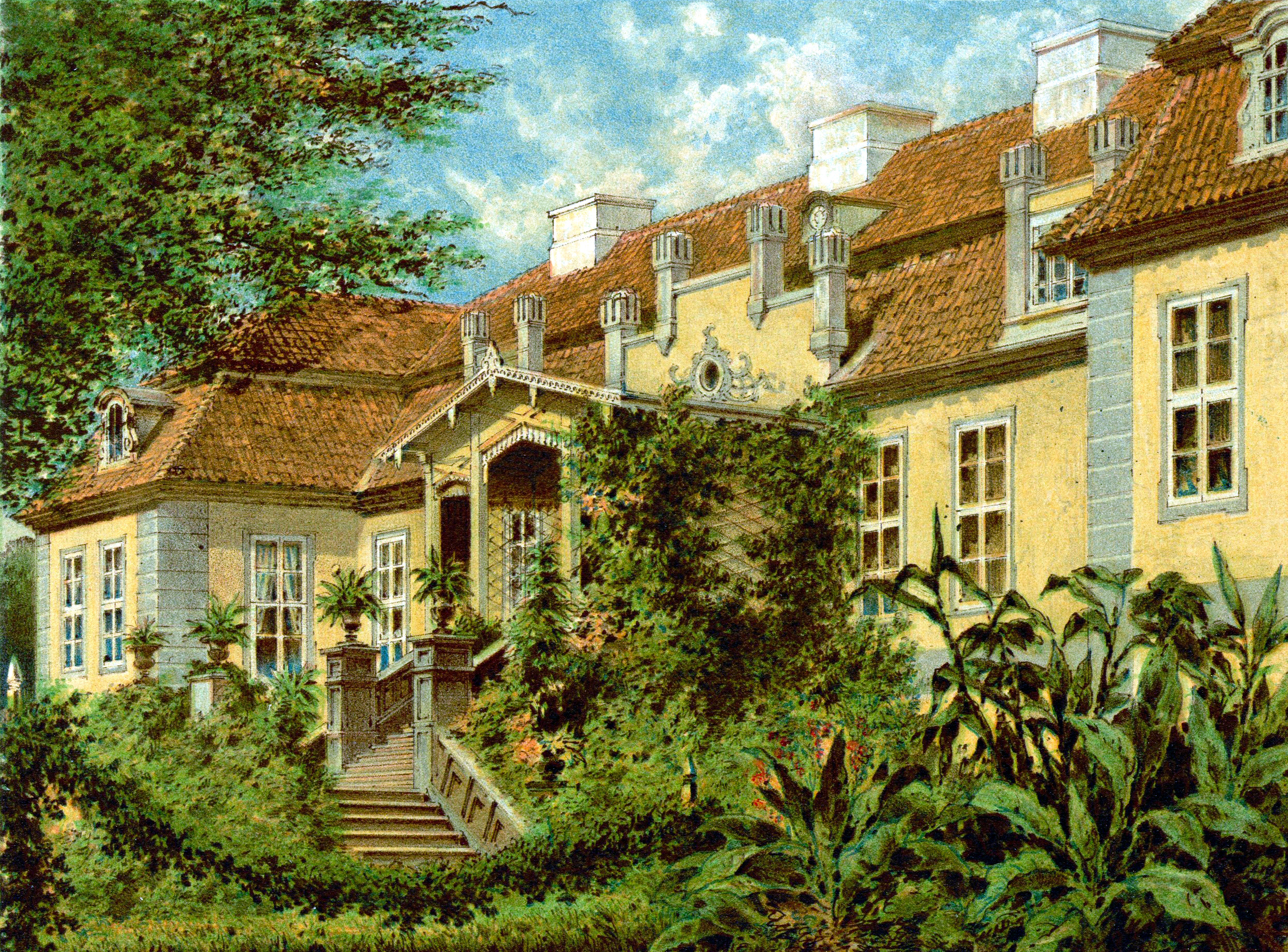
Local palace around 1860, edition by Alexander Duncker

German settlers arrived in the area probably during the 13th century and c. 1300 the Teutonic Order erected a castle (Ordensburg) to protect a crossroad here. The town, a so-called lischke, grew up around the castle. A church and a school existed at least from 1319, and from 1437 the town had town rights. In 1440 the town joined the Prussian Confederation, at the request of which Polish King Casimir IV Jagiellon signed the act of incorporation of the region to the Kingdom of Poland in 1454. During the subsequent Thirteen Years' War, the castle was largely destroyed probably already in 1458, but still partially inhabited in 1474 and in the 19th century its cellar vaults were discovered adjacent to the town church. After the war, per the peace treaty signed in Toruń in 1466, the town became a part of Poland as a fief held by the Teutonic Knights. In 1469 the town became the fief of the knight Konrad von Egloffstein, who built a palace on an island in a lake south of the town. The palace was rebuilt during the 16th century and again in 1778. Caspar Hennenberger served as a priest in the town from 1554 to 1560. The town suffered destruction from fires on several occasions: in 1520, 1571, 1659, 1681 and 1776.

From the 18th century, the town was part of the Kingdom of Prussia, and in 1871 it became part of Germany, within which it was administratively located in Landkreis Bartenstein (Bartoszyce county) in the province of East Prussia. In 1875, the town had a population of 2,167. Nine annual fairs were held in the town in the late 19th century. A railway connection was built to the town in 1902.

Around 60 percent of the town was destroyed in fighting during World War I (later rebuilt). After World War II the region was placed under Soviet administration according to the post-war Potsdam Agreement.

== Notable residents ==
- Andreas von Kreytzen (1579-1641)
- Georg Weissel (1590-1635), poet
- Arnold Lyongrün (1871-1935), artist
- Walter Krupinski (1920-2000), Luftwaffe general
