= Altrossgarten Church =

Coordinates: 54°43′00″N 20°31′28″E

Altroßgärter Kirche
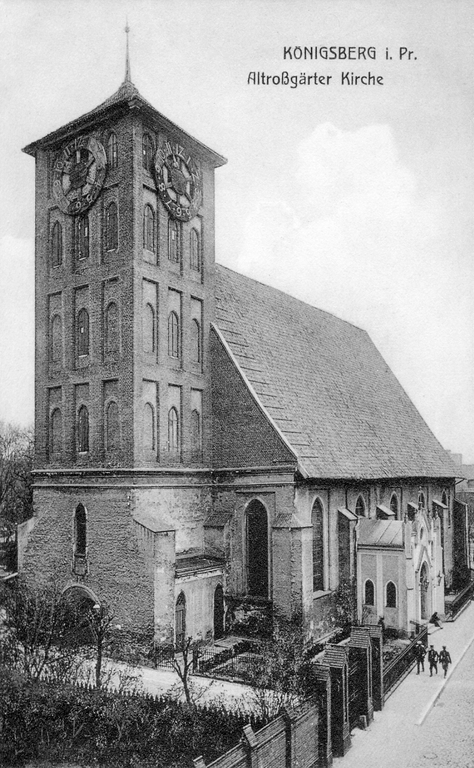
- The new church, c. 1906
- Altroßgärter Kirche
- Location: Königsberg
- Denomination: Protestant

History
- Status: former church
- Consecrated: 1623 / 1683

Architecture
- Architects: Wilhelm Rincklake; Wilhelm Frydag
- Demolished: 1945 / 1968

Altrossgarten Church (German: Altroßgärter Kirche, also spelled Altroßgärtner) was a Protestant church in northeastern Königsberg. Johann Friedrich Schultz, an Enlightenment, Protestant, theologian, mathematician and philosopher was Deacon of the church in 1775.

== History ==
The parishioners in the Rossgarten quarter originally belonged to Löbenicht Church. They were then allowed to build a small wooden chapel on Predigerstraße, which was dedicated in 1623 and completed the following year. The first pastor was the hymnist Georg Weissel from Domnau (1590-1635), previously pastor in Friedland. Although this church was originally known as the Rossgarten Church (Roßgärter Kirche), its name was changed to Altroßgärter Kirche (Old Rossgarten Church) to differentiate it from Neurossgarten Church built in Neurossgarten in the 1640s.

Because of the increasing population of Rossgarten, a replacement brick church was built around the chapel by the initiative for Weissel's successor, Pastor Georg Falck (1625-1720). Construction began in 1651 and its dedication occurred in 1683; the prior wooden chapel was dismantled from 1683-84. The new church's steeple with tented roof dated to 1693.

Sights of Altrossgarten Church included its high altar from 1677, Baroque baptismal chamber, and a confessional with columns by Isaak Riga the Younger from 1692. The church's organ with two caryatids was designed by Adam Gottlob Casparini. The chamber tomb on the northern side had a beautiful wrought iron door designed by the locksmith Johann Michael Sommer in 1712.

The church was restored in 1923. Pastors of the church included Kons.-Rat B. Ankermann, Paul Kuessner, W. Pensky, Lic. Erich Leidreiter, and Erich Lackner.

Altrossgarten Church was heavily damaged by the 1944 Bombing of Königsberg and 1945 Battle of Königsberg, with its ruins demolished by the Soviet administration in Kaliningrad in 1968. A silver-gilt chalice from the church is now in the Berlin archives of the Evangelical Church in Germany.
