= Johann Stobäus =

German composer (1580–1646)

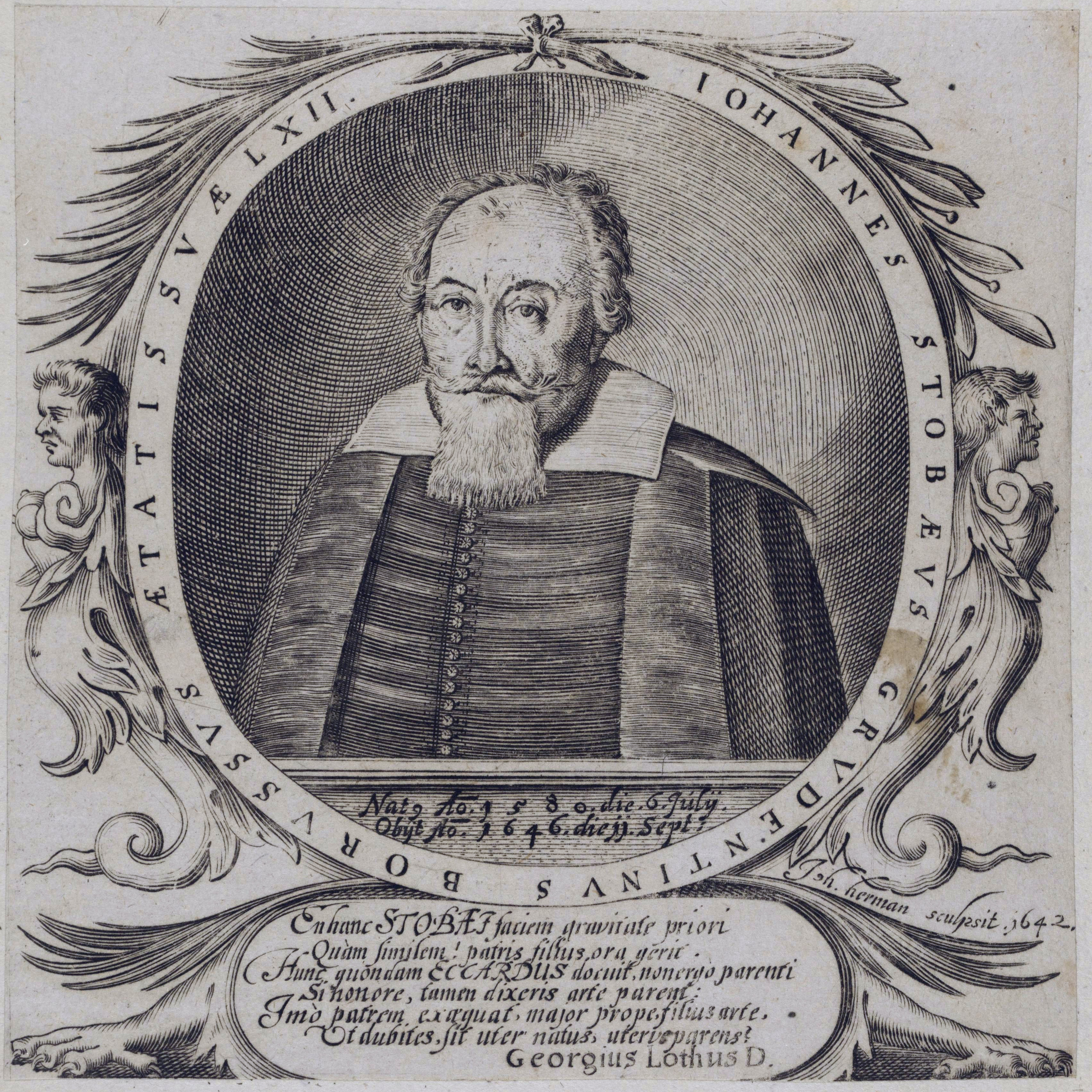
- Born: July 6, 1580; Graudenz (Grudziądz), Royal Prussia, Polish–Lithuanian Commonwealth
- Died: September 11, 1646 (aged 66); Königsberg, Ducal Prussia, Polish–Lithuanian Commonwealth
- Occupations: composer, lutenist

Johann Stobäus (6 July 1580 – 11 September 1646) was a composer and lutenist.

== Life ==
Stobäus was born at Graudenz (now Grudziądz, Poland) in the Polish–Lithuanian Commonwealth. From 1599 to 1608 he was a pupil of Johannes Eccard, the Kapellmeister of Königsberg (in the Duchy of Prussia, a vassal duchy of Poland). In 1601 he joined the princely Kapelle as a bass singer, and in 1602 he became Kantor at Königsberg Cathedral. In 1626 he succeeded Eccard as Kapellmeister, remaining in the post until his death. He died at Königsberg.

Stobäus, known as Stobaeus Grudentinus Borussus for his birthplace, wrote music for liturgical use, as well as songs and compositions for lute. Much of his manuscript music was lost in World War II; what remains is largely held at the Berlin State Library. Stobäus's Commonplace Book, containing songs, instrumental music and drawings of instruments, is preserved at the British Library (Sloane MS 1021).

== Works ==
- Cantiones Sacrae 5–10. v. item Magnificat, Frankfurt/Oder 1624
- Geistliche Lieder auf gewöhnliche Preußische Kirchenmelodien, Danzig 1634
- Erster und Ander Theil der Preußischen Fest-Lieder, 5-8 voices (incomplete), Elbing 1642 and Königsberg 1644, including a motet "Such, wer da will, ein ander Ziel" with his own melody

== Recordings ==
- Stobaeus, Johann: "Lob- unnd Danck Lied (Gott ist und bleibt der König)", and "Ein anderes auf denselben von Gott gnädigst verliehenen sechsjährigen Stillstand. Anno 1630". Königsberg: Lorentz Segebad, 1630. In Friedens-Seufftzer und Jubel-Geschrey - Music for the Peace of Westphalia. Weser-Renaissance Ensemble Bremen dir. Manfred Cordes. cpo
