= Johannes Eccard =

German composer and kapellmeister

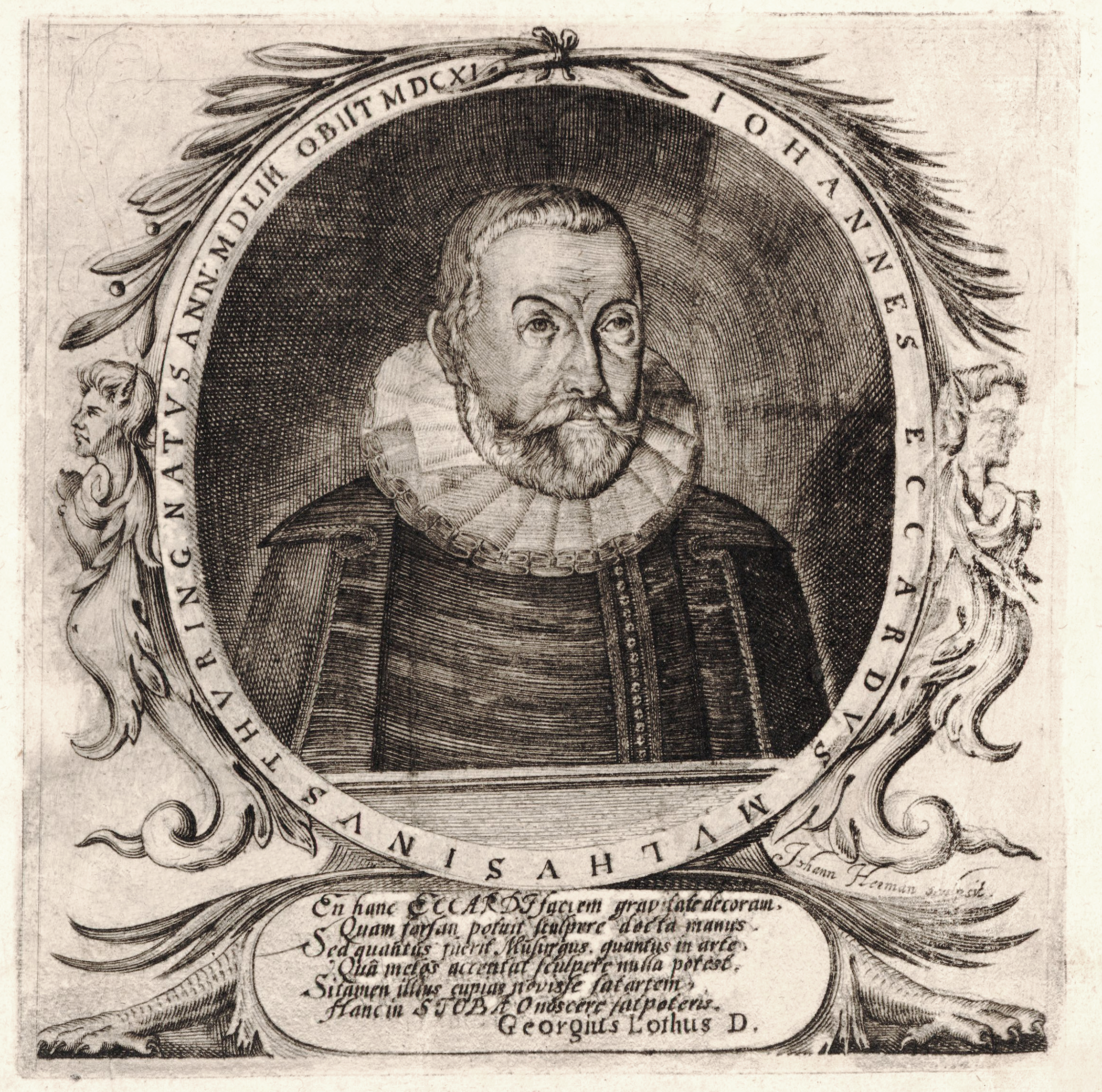
Johannes Eccard

Johannes Eccard (1553–1611) was a German composer and kapellmeister. He was an early principal conductor at the Berlin court chapel.

== Biography ==
Eccard was born at Mühlhausen, in present-day Thuringia, Germany. At the age of eighteen he went to Munich, where he became the pupil of Orlando Lasso. In his company, Eccard is said to have visited Paris, but in 1574, he was again at Mühlhausen, where he resided for four years. There he, together with Joachim a Burck, edited some works of his first master, a collection of sacred songs, called Crepundia sacra Helmboldi (1577). Soon afterwards he obtained an appointment as musician in the house of Jacob Fugger, the Augsburg banker.

In 1583 he became assistant conductor, and in 1599 conductor at Königsberg to Georg Friedrich, Margrave of Brandenburg-Anspach, the administrator of the Duchy of Prussia. In 1608 he was called by Joachim Frederick, Elector of Brandenburg as principal conductor in Berlin, but this post he held only for three years, owing to his death at Königsberg in 1611.

Eccard's works consist exclusively of vocal compositions, such as songs, sacred cantatas and chorales for four or five, and sometimes for seven, eight, or even nine voices. Their polyphonic structure is a marvel of art and still garners the admiration of musicians. At the same time his works are filled with a spirit of true religious feeling. Before the First World War, his setting of Martin Luther's words "Ein feste Burg ist unser Gott" ("A Mighty Fortress Is Our God") was regarded by the Germans as their representative national hymn.

Eccard and his school are inseparably connected with the history of the Protestant Reformation. Of Eccard's songs a great many collections are extant such as those published in Der Evangelische Kirchengesang (1843) by Baron Karl Georg August Vivigens von Winterfeld.

== Works ==
- Motet on "Nun liebe Seel, nun ist es Zeit"
- Nun schürz dich, Gretlein, schürz dich
- Übers Gebirg Maria geht, five-part motet
- Christ ist erstanden
- Es rühmt die Heilige Schrift (1591)
- Nachdem die Sonn beschlossen (1600)
- Wir glauben all an einen Gott
- Maria wallt zum Heiligtum (also sung in English: "When to the temple Mary went")
