= Herr, wir bringen in Brot und Wein =

1969 hymn

- Christian hymn
- Occasion: Offertory
- Written: 1969
- Text: by Hans Bernhard Meyer
- Language: German
- Meter: 8 6 8 6
- Melody: by Peter Janssens
- Published: 1970

"Herr, wir bringen in Brot und Wein" (Lord, we bring in bread and wine) is a Christian offertory hymn with German text by Hans Bernhard Meyer, and a melody by Peter Janssens. The song, of the genre Neues Geistliches Lied (NGL), is part of German hymnals, including Gotteslob, and songbooks.

== History ==
The song "Herr, wir bringen in Brot und Wein" was written as part of the "Innsbrucker Universitätsmesse" (Innsbruck University mass), which was commissioned to celebrate the 600th anniversary of the University of Innsbruck in 1969. The theologian and hymnodist Hans Bernhard Meyer and the composer Peter Janssens wrote the mass in collaboration, in an effort to express faith in contemporary texts and music in a genre later known as Neues Geistliches Lied (NGL). The mass was titled "Gute Nachricht für alle Völker" (Good news for all peoples) and first published in print and on record in 1970. The complete mass consists of the following songs:

- Zum Eingang: Herr, dein Wort ist gute Nachricht
- Kyrielitanei
- Antwortpsalm: Singt dem Herrn alle Völker und Rassen
- Allelujavers mit Klangmeditationen
- Gabenbereitung: Herr, wir bringen in Brot und Wein
- Lied zum Brotbrechen: Lamm Gottes

According to some sources, Meyer may have based the text on a 1965 work in Dutch by Huub Oosterhuis. Meyer created a song with three verses and a refrain "Herr, wir bringen in Brot und Wein unsere Welt zu dir. Du schenkst uns deine Gegenwart im österlichen Mahl." (Lord, we bring in bread and wine our world to you. You give us the gift of Your presence in the meal of Easter.)

In a broadcast about the hymn, the theologian Thomas Weißer noted that bread and wine, the gifts of the offertory in preparation of the Eucharist, are already symbols in a general way, bread as a necessity for survival and wine standing for an abundance of extra enjoyment, which together can represent the world.

The song was included in the German Catholic hymnal Gotteslob of 1975 as GL 534, but only the refrain. Winfried Offele composed a four-part choral setting with organ or piano and a melody instrument such as flute in 1973. The song was included, now with the complete text, in the 2013 edition as GL 184, in the section "Gesänge – Woche – Gesänge zur Gabenbereitung" (Chants – Week – chants for offertory). The song is included in several songbooks.
