= Christoph Lehmann =

Christoph Lehmann may refer to:

- Christoph Lehmann (ski jumper)
- Christoph Lehmann (musician)
