= Christoph Lehmann (musician) =

German church musician (1947–2024)

- Born: 7 May 1947; Beijing, China
- Died: 31 August 2024 (aged 77); Gelting, Germany
- Occupations: Organist; Harpsichordist; Church musician; Composer

Christoph Lehmann (7 May 1947 – 31 August 2024) was a German organist, harpsichordist, church musician and composer, especially in the field of Neues Geistliches Lied (NGL). He had worked as a continuo harpsichordist and organist in performances and recordings of early music with several ensembles.

== Life and career ==
Lehmann was born in Beijing. He studied church music in Berlin and harpsichord with Hugo Ruf in Cologne.

From 1972 to 1984, he was a church musician at the Protestant Thomaskirche in Düsseldorf, as well as a theatre musician in Düsseldorf, Bochum, Bonn and Aachen. Lehmann composed numerous songs of the genre Neues Geistliches Lied. Two songs with music by Lehmann were included in the second edition of the common German Catholic hymnal, Gotteslob, in 2013, "Ich lobe meinen Gott, der aus der Tiefe mich holt" with text by Hans-Jürgen Netz) in the common section as GL 383, and "Wo Menschen sich vergessen", with text by Thomas Laubach in regional section, such as GL 832 in the Diocese of Cologne.

Since 1985, Lehmann has been an organist and harpsichordist in the field of early music for various ensembles, including Il Dolcimelo, Das Kleine Konzert in Dormagen, Movimento, and La Stravaganza in Cologne. With the group Epoca Barocca, he recorded sonatas by Christoph Schaffrath, including a duet for two harpsichords played with Christoph Alselm Noll in 2003. A reviewer noted that he was "particularly impressive in his brilliant performance of the demanding keyboard parts".

== Work ==
Popular songs with music by Lehmann include:

- "Wir werden leben, überleben" (text: Alois Albrecht
- "Komm, lass diese Nacht nicht enden" (1977; text: Hans-Jürgen Netz)
- "Ich lobe meinen Gott, der aus der Tiefe mich holt" (1979; text Netz)
- "Alles was atmet" (1987; text: Netz)
- "Lass uns den Weg der Gerechtigkeit gehn" (1983; joint translation from Spanish with Diethard Zils; melody: Cristóbal Halffter)
- "Durch das Dunkel hindurch" (1987; text: Netz)
- "Wo Menschen sich vergessen" ("Da berühren sich Himmel und Erde") (1989; text: Thomas Laubach)
