= Brot, das die Hoffnung nährt =

1974 song

- Christian hymn
- Text: by Wilhelm Wilms
- Language: German
- Melody: by Peter Janssens
- Composed: 1974
- Published: 1975

"Brot, das die Hoffnung nährt" (Bread that feeds hope) is a Christian hymn written in 1974 with German text by Wilhelm Wilms and a melody by Peter Janssens. The song, of the genre Neues Geistliches Lied (NGL), is part of German hymnals, including regional sections of the Gotteslob, and songbooks including ecumenical collections and books for young people.

== History ==
The Catholic priest Wilhelm Willms wrote the text of "Brot, das die Hoffnung nährt" in 1974, entitled "Neues Lied im alten Land". The composer Peter Janssens wrote the melody the same year. The song is of the genre Neues Geistliches Lied (NGL), an effort to express Christian faith in contemporary texts and music.

The hymn is in three stanzas of six lines each. All third and sixth lines repeat: "Lied, das die Welt umkreist, das die Welt umkreist" (song that surrounds the world). In a broadcast about the hymn, the theologian Thomas Weißer noted that the first stanza alludes to the Old Testament, the feeding with manna in the desert.

In 1975, the song was included in the first German Catholic hymnal Gotteslob in regional sections. It was included in the 2013 edition as GL 378. The song is part of several songbooks, including collections for young people, such as God for You(th), and ecumenical songbooks, including rise up plus.
