= Manchmal feiern wir mitten im Tag =

1974 song

- Christian hymn
- English: Sometimes we celebrate in the middle of the day
- Text: by Alois Albrecht
- Language: German
- Melody: by Peter Janssens
- Composed: 1974
- Published: 1975

"Manchmal feiern wir mitten im Tag" (Sometimes we celebrate in the middle of the day) is a Christian hymn written in 1974 with German text by Alois Albrecht and a melody by Peter Janssens. The song, of the genre Neues Geistliches Lied (NGL), is part of German hymnals, including Gotteslob, and songbooks including ecumenical collections and books for young people. It begins: "Manchmal feiern wir mitten im Tag ein Fest der Auferstehung" (Sometimes we celebrate in the middle of the day a feast of resurrection).

== History ==
The Catholic priest Alois Albrecht and the composer Peter Janssens wrote "Manchmal feiern wir mitten im Tag" in collaboration in 1974, in an effort to express faith in contemporary texts and music in a genre later known as Neues Geistliches Lied (NGL).

The hymn is in four stanzas of four lines, with the last two lines always repeated, in the first stanza: "Manchmal feiern wir mitten im Tag ein Fest der Auferstehung" (Sometimes we celebrate in the middle of the day a feast of resurrection)." In a broadcast about the hymn, the theologian Thomas Weißer noted that while the text refers prominently to resurrection, in every stanza, it is not focused on the Resurrection of Jesus, but on the thought that changes can happen in everyday life, that a song can begin where words are rephrased (second stanza), that peace can begin when weapons are transformed to better usage (third stanza), and that a new spirit is there when borders and limitations are conquered (forth stanza). Due to this general interpretation, it has been used for many occasions besides Easter.

In 1975, the song was included in the first German Catholic hymnal Gotteslob in regional sections, such as GL 896 in the Diocese of Münster. The song was included in the 2013 edition as GL 472, in the section "Gesänge – Gerechtigkeit und Friede" (Chants – Justice and Peace). The song is part of several songbooks, including collections for young people, such as God for You(th), and ecumenical songbooks, including rise up plus.
