= Alle Menschen höret auf dies neue Lied =

Christian offertory hymn

- Christian hymn
- English: All people, listen to this new song
- Written: 1972
- Text: by Sigisbert Kraft, translating from Dutch
- Language: German
- Meter: 6 5 6 5 6 5 6 5
- Melody: by Wim ter Burg
- Published: 1975

"Alle Menschen höret auf dies neue Lied" (All people, listen to this new song) is a Christian offertory hymn with German text, translated in 1972 by Sigisbert Kraft from a 1966 Dutch hymn by Simon Jelsma with a melody by Wim ter Burg. It appeared from 1975 in German hymnals and song books.

== History ==
Sigisbert Kraft was a priest and later bishop of the Old Catholics in Germany. He translated in 1972 a Dutch song that Simon Jelsma had written in 1966. The Dutch song came with a melody written by Wim ter Burg. The hymn was included in regional sections of the first common German Catholic hymnal Gotteslob of 1975, such as GL 928 in the Diocese of Limburg, and its 2013 edition, such as GL 717 in the Diocese of St. Pölten and GL 730 in Limburg. It is also part of other songbooks, including ecumenical collections and books for children and young people.

== Text, theme and melody ==
The text, in five stanzas of eight short lines each, addresses all people, first to listen. In the second stanza, a meal together is described, breaking bread, with full glasses of wine and candles lit. The following stanzas expand reflections of being open for God's presence in the Eucharist. The final stanza summarises that he is with all, a hope for the blind, lame and deaf, and healing needs such as loneliness.

The melody was composed by Wim ter Burg in 1966. It is simple, with lines 1, 2 and 4 the same, and an even flow throughout. The third line reaches the climax of the melody.

== Usage ==
The song is recommended as an offertory hymn for each Eucharist, but especially on Maundy Thursday, Corpus Christi first communion and confirmation.
