= Selig seid ihr, wenn ihr einfach lebt =

Contemporary Christian hymn

- Christian hymn
- Written: 1979
- Text: by Friedrich Karl Barth and Peter Horst
- Language: German
- Melody: by Peter Janssens

"Selig seid ihr, wenn ihr einfach lebt" (Blessed are you if you live simply) is a Christian hymn written in 1979. The song, of the genre Neues Geistliches Lied (NGL), is included in hymnals both Protestant and Catholic, and in other songbooks.

== History ==
The text of "Selig seid ihr, wenn ihr einfach lebt" was written by Friedrich Karl Barth and Peter Horst in 1979, in an effort to express faith in contemporary texts and music in a genre later known as Neues Geistliches Lied (NGL). The melody and a four-part setting were composed the same year by Peter Janssens. The song features a list of beatitudes, similar to those in the Sermon on the Mount. As in the model, the song features conditions in which a person can be blessed or happy, all structured similarly in both wording and the simple rhythm of the tune. Many of the conditions invite to be aware, and to act, such as "wenn ihr Unrecht spürt" (when you detect injustice) and "wenn ihr Güte wagt" (when you dare to be kind).

The song was included in German Catholic hymnal Gotteslob as GL 458, in the section "Leben in der Welt – Sendung und Nachfolge" (Life in the world, mission and following). In the Protestant hymnal Evangelisches Gesangbuch, it is EG 651. The song is part of several songbooks, including ecumenical collections. The song is contained in a collection of mostly new sacred songs in arrangements with small or larger wind ensemble by Kurt Gäble, published by Schorer. The song is featured in a collection Liederwald (Forest of songs) of new songs for Christian services.
