= Und meine Seele singt =

2009 German Christian hymn

- Christian hymn
- English: And my soul sings
- Text: by Thomas Laubach
- Language: German
- Based on: Magnificat
- Melody: by Thomas Quast
- Composed: 2009
- Published: 2010

"Und meine Seele singt" (And my soul sings) is a Christian hymn in German with text by Thomas Laubach and music by Thomas Quast. It was written based on the Magnificat, as a song of the genre Neues Geistliches Lied.

== History and text ==
Thomas Laubach wrote the text of "Und meine Seele singt" based on the Magnificat. The melody was composed by Thomas Quast in 2009. It was first published in 2010 in the choral songbook of the band RUHAMA Ins Weite, and recorded. It appeared in 2020 in the songbook God for You(th), a collection for young people.

The text is in four stanzas of four lines each, with a short last line. The refrain "Und meine Seele singt" is sung after two stanzas and in the end. It text begins: "Du siehst mich an wie keiner, Du siehst uns, wie wir sind" (You look at me as nobody else, You see us as we are), beginning in the first person singular.
