= Yaak Karsunke =

German author and actor (1934–2025)

- Born: 4 June 1934; Berlin, Germany
- Died: 13 May 2025 (aged 90)
- Occupations: Author, actor

Yaak Karsunke (4 June 1934 – 13 May 2025) was a German author and actor.

== Life and career ==
Born on 4 June 1934 in Berlin as son of an engineer and a procurer of a publishing house, Karsunke grew up in the borough of Pankow. In 1949, his family moved to Friedenau in West Berlin, where he passed the Abitur in 1953 and studied jurisprudence for three semesters. From 1955 to 1957, he studied drama at the Max-Reinhardt-Schule, today known as the Ernst Busch Academy of Dramatic Arts.

In 1964, Karsunke moved to Munich, where he became involved with the Außerparlamentarische Opposition, becoming a spokesman for the Campaign for Nuclear Disarmament in 1968. Along with other leftist authors, he founded the literary review Kürbiskern, for which he served as editor-in-chief from 1965 until August 1968, when he resigned as a protest against the Soviet repression of the Prague Spring.

In the early 1970s, Karsunke befriended Rainer Werner Fassbinder, appearing in his films Love Is Colder Than Death (1969), Gods of the Plague (1970), and Berlin Alexanderplatz (1980). From 1976 to 1979, he served as Fassbinder's technical adviser at the German Film and Television Academy Berlin. From 1981 to 1999, he taught creative writing at the Berlin University of the Arts.

Karsunke has also worked extensively as a lyricist. Since the late-1960s, he has written many plays and radio dramas. In 1989, he published a crime novel, Toter Mann, for which he won the Deutscher Krimi Preis in 1990.

Karsunke died on 13 May 2025, at the age of 90.

== Works ==
- Kilroy & andere, Berlin 1967
- Reden und ausreden, Berlin 1969
- Hallo, Irina, Weinheim [u.a.] 1970 (with Dietlind Blech)
- Die Apotse kommen, Munich 1972 (with Riki Hachfeld)
- Bauernoper, Frankfurt am Main 1973 (with Peter Janssens)
- Josef Bachmann. Sonny Liston, Berlin 1973
- Ruhrkampf-Revue, Frankfurt am Main 1975 (with Peter Janssens)
- Da zwischen, Berlin 1979
- Unser schönes Amerika, Frankfurt am Main 1979 (with Wilhelm Dieter Siebert)
- Auf die Gefahr hin, Berlin 1982
- Nach Mitternacht, Frankfurt am Main 1982
- Die Guillotine umkreisen, Berlin 1984 (with Arwed D. Gorella)
- Kinder der Liebe, Frankfurt am Main 1986
- Toter Mann, Berlin 1989
- Gespräch mit dem Stein, Berlin 1992
- Hand & Fuß, Munich 2004

== In translation ==
- Arnold Wesker: Die Freunde, Frankfurt am Main 1970 (with Ingrid Karsunke)
