= Ich lobe meinen Gott, der aus der Tiefe mich holt =

Christian hymn

- Christian hymn
- English: I praise my God who gets me from the depths
- Occasion: Gloria
- Written: 1979
- Text: by Hans-Jürgen Netz
- Language: German
- Melody: by Christoph Lehmann
- Published: 2013

"Ich lobe meinen Gott, der aus der Tiefe mich holt" (I praise my God who gets me from the depths) is a 1979 Christian hymn with words in German by Hans-Jürgen Netz and a melody by Christoph Lehmann. This Neues Geistliches Lied song has appeared in the German Protestant and Catholic hymnals. It is a preferred song for conventions such as Kirchentag.

== History ==
Hans-Jürgen Netz wrote the text of the hymn "Ich lobe meinen Gott, der aus der Tiefe mich holt" in 1979, and Christoph Lehmann composed the music. They created the song for a choir of young people, Jugendsingkreis St. Peter und Paul in Neuhausen auf den Fildern, which was founded in 1970 to sing for a confirmation service. New songs like this one, of the genre Neues Geistliches Lied (NGL), were aimed at expressing the interests and ideas of young people better than traditional hymns. "Ich lobe meinen Gott" was written to take the place of the Gloria, taken from the Christmas story and repeated in every mass.

The song became part of the German Catholic hymnal Gotteslob in 2013, as GL 383 in the section Leben in Gott – Lob, Dank und Anbetung ("Life in God – Praise, thanks and adoration"). It was also included in other hymnals and songbooks.

== Text and theme ==
The text of "Ich lobe meinen Gott, der aus der Tiefe mich holt" is in three stanzas, each consisting of two lines and a long refrain. It is written in the first person. The first two lines all begin with "Ich lobe meinen Gott" (I praise my God) with an added reason, beginning with "der aus der Tiefe ich holt, damit ich lebe" (who gets me out of the depths so that I live), the others speaking of loosening chains, guiding to a new way, breaking speechlessness, drying tears, and chasing away anxiety. Every condition is followed by a positive outlook, "that I live" being followed by "that I am free", "that I act", "that I speak", "that I laugh" and "that I breathe". The refrain begins with looking around, saying first "Ehre sei Gott auf der Erde" (Glory be to God on Earth), which paraphrases the Gloria, Glory to God in the Highest. The following lines picture that people in all streets and houses will sing until a song rises to Heaven. The final part of the refrain is close to the Gloria, saying three times "Ehre sei Gott und den Menschen Frieden" (Glory to God, and peace to the people), closed by "Frieden auf Erden" (peace on Earth).

== Use ==
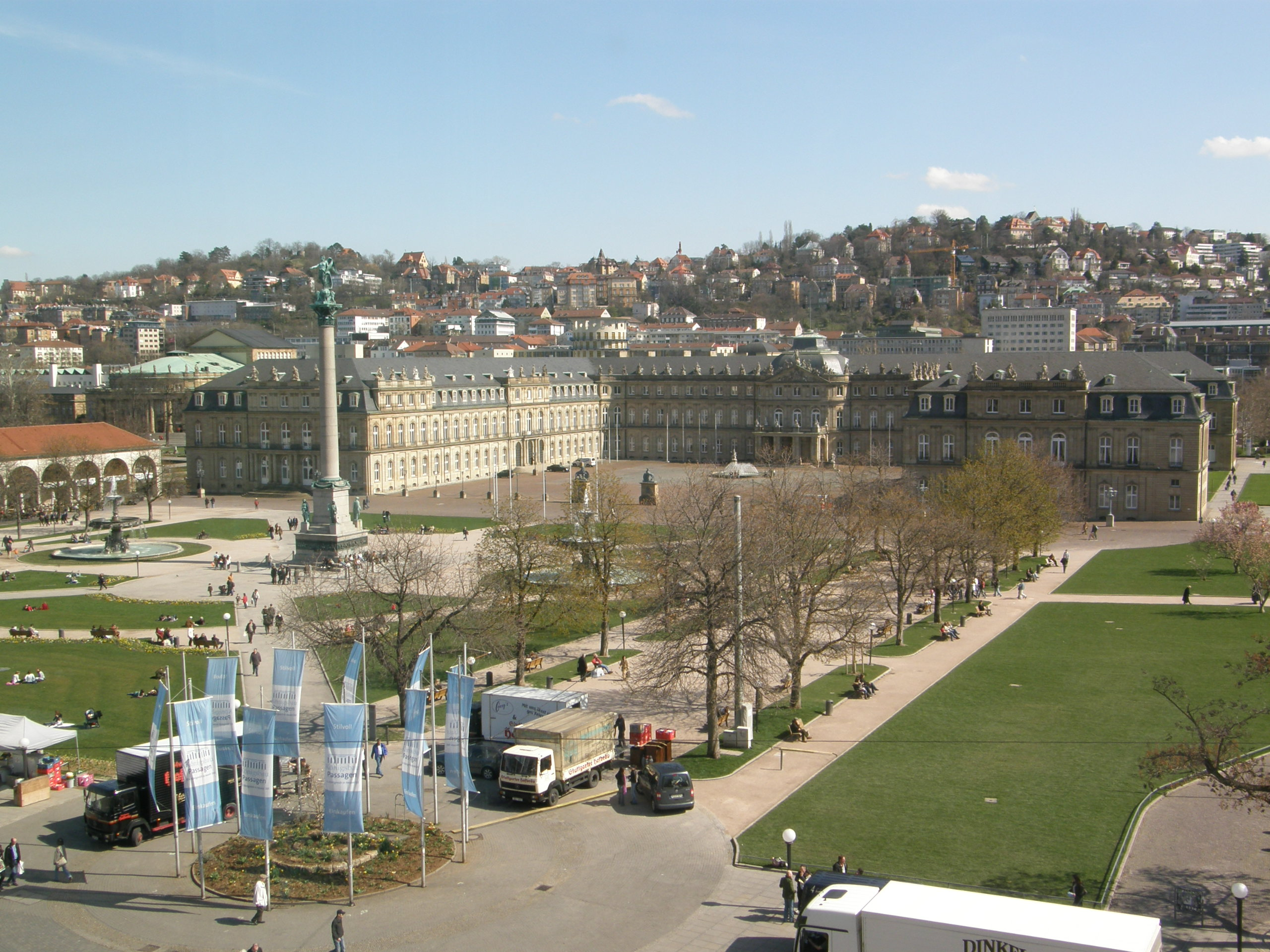
Aerial view of the Schlossplatz

"Ich lobe meinen Gott, der aus der Tiefe mich holt" is a preferred song for the Kirchentag Protestant church conventions. It was sung for the first ecumenical Kirchentag in 2003. At the Kirchentag 2015 in Stuttgart, the song was performed during an event called Abend der Begegnung (Evening of meeting) on the Schlossplatz with around 250,000 people attending; the song's verses were sung and played on three stages, and the crowd joined in the refrain. The song was performed for the Kirchentag 2017 in Wittenberg, which celebrated 500 years of the Reformation.
