= Eines Tages kam einer =

1991 song

- Christian hymn
- Text: by Alois Albrecht
- Language: German
- Melody: by Peter Janssens
- Composed: 1991
- Published: 1991

"Eines Tages kam einer" (One day someone came) is a Christian hymn written in 1991 with German text by Alois Albrecht and a melody by Peter Janssens. The song, of the genre Neues Geistliches Lied (NGL), is part of German hymnals, including Ein Segen sein, and songbooks including ecumenical collections and books for young people.

== History ==
The Catholic priest Alois Albrecht, who worked at the Bamberg Cathedral, and the composer Peter Janssens wrote "Eines Tages kam einer" in collaboration in 1991, in an effort to express faith in contemporary texts and music in a genre known as Neues Geistliches Lied (NGL).

The hymn is in seven stanzas of four lines each. Every stanza begins with the same line, talking about someone who came some day and then describing aspects of the person, first in neutral attributes but later by information that identifies him as Jesus. The first stanza refers to the charm of his voice and message and of the warmth of his words. In a broadcast about the hymn, Ruth Schneeberger noted that Jesus is described as if someone who first met him reported how they were fascinated by the delivery of his message.

The song is part of Ein Segen sein, the edition of the Catholic hymnal in German Gotteslob for young people, as No. 562, and of several songbooks, including other collections for young people and ecumenical songbooks, including rise up plus.
