= Gloria in excelsis Deo =

Christian hymn

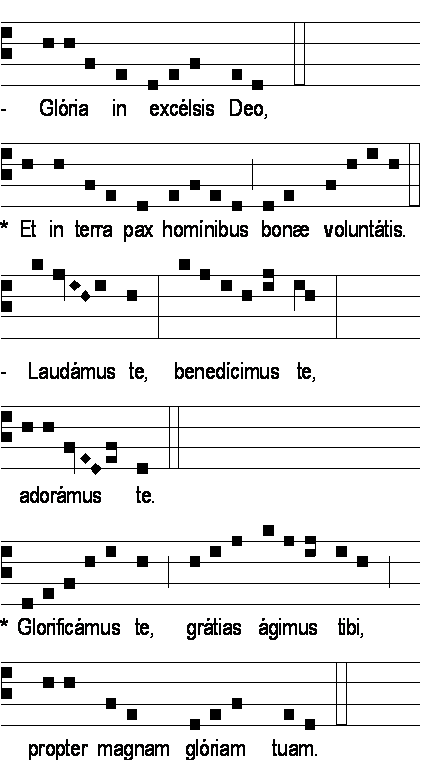
One melody for the text in neume notation

"Gloria in excelsis Deo" (Latin for 'Glory to God in the highest') is a Christian hymn known also as the Greater Doxology (as distinguished from the "Minor Doxology" or Gloria Patri) and the Angelic Hymn or Hymn of the Angels. The name is often abbreviated to Gloria in Excelsis or simply Gloria.

Gloria VIII from the Roman Gradual
Gloria VIII

The hymn begins with the words that the angels sang in the annunciation to the shepherds of the birth of Jesus according to the nativity story in the Christian Bible, in Latin in the Douay-Rheims Bible. Other verses were added very early, forming a doxology.

An article by David Flusser links the text of the verse in Luke with ancient Jewish liturgy.

== History ==
Gloria in excelsis Deo is an example of the psalmi idiotici ("private psalms", i.e., compositions by individuals in imitation of the biblical Psalter) that were popular in the 2nd and 3rd centuries. Other surviving examples of this lyric poetry are the Te Deum and the Phos Hilaron. In the 4th century it became part of morning prayers, and is still recited in the Byzantine Rite Orthros service.

The Latin translation is traditionally attributed to Hilary of Poitiers (c. 300–368), who may have learned it while in the East (359–360); as such, it is part of a loose tradition of early Latin translations of the scripture known as the Vetus Latina. The Vulgate Latin translation of the Bible was commissioned only in 382.

The Latin hymn thus uses the word excelsis to translate the Greek word ὑψίστοις – hypsístois (the highest) in Luke 2:14: Douay-Rheims, not the word altissimis, which Jerome preferred for his translation. However, this word is used near the end: tu solus Altissimus, Iesu Christe (you alone the Most High, Jesus Christ).

== Present-day Greek Orthodox text ==
Δόξα Σοι τῷ δείξαντι τὸ φῶς.
Δόξα ἐν ὑψίστοις Θεῷ καὶ ἐπὶ γῆς εἰρήνη ἐν ἀνθρώποις εὐδοκία. (Note: This verse follows the Byzantine text-type, which has εὐδοκία in the nominative case and thus translates to good will or favour. Modern critical editions of the New Testament used by scholars and most Bible societies follow the Alexandrian text-type, which has εὐδοκίας with a sigma at the end, which makes it a genitive case and renders it of good will or of favour.)
Ὑμνοῦμέν σε, εὐλογοῦμέν σε, προσκυνοῦμέν σε, δοξολογοῦμέν σε, εὐχαριστοῦμέν σοι, διὰ τὴν μεγάλην σου δόξαν.
Κύριε Βασιλεῦ, ἐπουράνιε Θεέ, Πάτερ παντοκράτορ, Κύριε Υἱὲ μονογενές, Ἰησοῦ Χριστέ, καὶ Ἅγιον Πνεῦμα.
Κύριε ὁ Θεός, ὁ ἀμνὸς τοῦ Θεοῦ, ὁ Υἱός τοῦ Πατρός, ὁ αἴρων τὴν ἁμαρτίαν τοῦ κόσμου, ἐλέησον ἡμᾶς, ὁ αἴρων τὰς ἁμαρτίας τοῦ κόσμου.
Πρόσδεξαι τὴν δέησιν ἡμῶν, ὁ καθήμενος ἐν δεξιᾷ τοῦ Πατρός, καὶ ἐλέησον ἡμᾶς.
Ὅτι σὺ εἶ μόνος Ἅγιος, σὺ εἶ μόνος Κύριος, Ἰησοῦς Χριστός, εἰς δόξαν Θεοῦ Πατρός. Ἀμήν.
Καθ' ἑκάστην ἡμέραν εὐλογήσω σε, καὶ αἰνέσω τὸ ὄνομά σου εἰς τὸν αἰῶνα καὶ εἰς τὸν αἰῶνα τοῦ αἰῶνος.
Καταξίωσον, Κύριε, ἐν τῇ ἡμέρᾳ ταύτῃ, ἀναμαρτήτους φυλαχθῆναι ἡμᾶς.
Εὐλογητὸς εἶ, Κύριε, ὁ Θεὸς τῶν Πατέρων ἡμῶν, καὶ αἰνετὸν καὶ δεδοξασμένον τὸ ὄνομά σου εἰς τοὺς αἰῶνας. Ἀμήν.
Γένοιτο, Κύριε, τὸ ἔλεός σου ἐφ' ἡμᾶς, καθάπερ ἠλπίσαμεν ἐπὶ σέ.
Εὐλογητὸς εἶ, Κύριε. δίδαξόν με τὰ δικαιώματά σου (γ').
Κύριε, καταφυγὴ ἐγενήθης ἡμῖν, ἐν γενεᾷ καὶ γενεᾷ.
Ἐγὼ εἶπα· Κύριε, ἐλέησόν με, ἴασαι τὴν ψυχήν μου, ὅτι ἥμαρτόν σοι.
Κύριε, πρὸς σὲ κατέφυγον, δίδαξόν με τοῦ ποιεῖν τὸ θέλημά σου, ὅτι σὺ εἶ ὁ Θεός μου.
Ὅτι παρὰ σοὶ πηγὴ ζωῆς, ἐν τῷ φωτί σου ὀψόμεθα φῶς.
Παράτεινον τὸ ἔλεός σου τοῖς γινώσκουσί σε.
Ἅγιος ὁ Θεός, Ἅγιος Ἰσχυρός, Ἅγιος Ἀθάνατος, ἐλέησον ἡμᾶς (ἐκ γ').
Δόξα Πατρὶ καὶ Υἱῷ καὶ Ἁγίῳ Πνεύματι,
καὶ νῦν καὶ ἀεὶ καὶ εἰς τοὺς αἰῶνας τῶν αἰώνων. Ἀμήν.
Ἅγιος Ἀθάνατος, ἐλέησον ἡμᾶς.
Ἅγιος ὁ Θεός, Ἅγιος Ἰσχυρός, Ἅγιος Ἀθάνατος, ἐλέησον ἡμᾶς.
(Verses follow that vary according to whether the celebration is on a Sunday or a weekday.)

Translation:

Glory to you who have shown us the light.
Glory to God in the highest and on earth peace, good will to all people.
We praise you, we bless you, we worship you, we glorify you, we give thanks to you for your great glory.
Lord, King, heavenly God, Father, almighty; Lord, the only-begotten Son, Jesus Christ, and Holy Spirit.
Lord God, Lamb of God, Son of the Father who take away the sin of the world, have mercy on us, you who take away the sins of the world.
Receive our prayer, you who sit at the right hand of the Father, and have mercy on us.
For you only are holy, only you are Lord, Jesus Christ, to the glory of God the Father. Amen.
Each day we bless you, and we praise your name forever and to the ages of ages.
Lord, grant that we may be kept this day without sin.
Blessed are you, Lord, God of our fathers. Your name is praised and glorified throughout all ages. Amen.
Let your mercy, Lord, be upon us, as our trust is in you.
Blessed are you, Lord, teach me your statutes (3).
Lord, you have been our refuge from generation to generation.
I said: Lord, have mercy on me; heal my soul, for I have sinned against you.
Lord, to you have I fled; teach me to do your will, for you are my God.
For you are the source of life, and in your light we shall see light.
Extend your mercy to those who know you.
Holy God, Holy Mighty, Holy Immortal, have mercy on us (3).
Glory to the Father and the Son and the Holy Spirit.
Now and forever and to the ages of ages. Amen.
Holy Immortal, have mercy on us.
Holy God, Holy Mighty, Holy Immortal, have mercy on us.

== Present-day Coptic text ==
Ⲙⲁⲣⲉⲛϩⲱⲥ ⲛⲉⲙ ⲛⲓⲁⲅⲅⲉⲗⲟⲥ: ϫⲉ ⲟⲩⲱ̀ⲟⲩ ⲙ̀Ⲫ̀ⲛⲟⲩϯ ϧⲉⲛ ⲛⲏⲉⲧϭⲟⲥⲓ: ⲛⲉⲙ ⲟⲩϩⲓⲣⲏⲛⲏ ϩⲓϫⲉⲛ ⲡⲓⲕⲁϩⲓ: ⲛⲉⲙ ⲟⲩϯⲙⲁϯ ϧⲉⲛ ⲛⲓⲣⲱⲙⲓ.
Ⲧⲉⲛϩⲱⲥ ⲉ̀ⲣⲟⲕ: ⲧⲉⲛⲥ̀ⲙⲟⲩ ⲉ̀ⲣⲟⲕ: ⲧⲉⲛϣⲉⲙϣⲓ ⲙ̀ⲙⲟⲕ: ⲧⲉⲛⲟⲩⲱϣⲧ ⲙ̀ⲙⲟⲕ: ⲧⲉⲛⲟⲩⲱⲛϩ ⲛⲁⲕ ⲉ̀ⲃⲟⲗ: ⲧⲉⲛⲥⲁϫⲓ ϧⲉⲛ ⲡⲉⲕⲱ̀ⲟⲩ: ⲧⲉⲛϣⲉⲡϩ̀ⲙⲟⲧ ⲛ̀ⲧⲟⲧⲕ ⲉⲑⲃⲉ ⲡⲉⲕⲛⲓϣϯ ⲛ̀ⲱ̀ⲟⲩ.
Ⲡ̀ϭⲟⲓⲥ Ⲡⲓⲟⲩⲣⲟ ⲉⲧ ϩⲓϫⲉⲛ ⲛⲓⲫⲏⲟⲩⲓ̀: Ⲫ̀ⲛⲟⲩϯ Ⲫ̀ⲓⲱⲧ Ⲡⲓⲡⲁⲛⲧⲟⲕⲣⲁⲧⲱⲣ: Ⲡ̀ϭⲟⲓⲥ Ⲡ̀ϣⲏⲣⲓ ⲙ̀ⲙⲁⲩⲁⲧϥ ⲡⲓⲙⲟⲛⲟⲅⲉⲛⲏⲥ Ⲓⲏⲥⲟⲩⲥ Ⲡⲓⲭ̀ⲣⲓⲥⲧⲟⲥ: ⲛⲉⲙ Ⲡⲓⲡ̀ⲛⲉⲩⲙⲁ Ⲉⲑⲟⲩⲁⲃ.
Ⲡ̀ϭⲟⲓⲥ Ⲫ̀ⲛⲟⲩϯ Ⲡⲓϩⲏⲓⲃ ⲛ̀ⲧⲉ Ⲫ̀ⲛⲟⲩϯ: Ⲡⲓϣⲏⲣⲓ ⲛ̀ⲧⲉ Ⲫ̀ⲓⲱⲧ: ⲫⲏⲉⲧⲱ̀ⲗⲓ ⲙ̀ⲫ̀ⲛⲟⲃⲓ ⲛ̀ⲧⲉ ⲡⲓⲕⲟⲥⲙⲟⲥ ⲛⲁⲓ ⲛⲁⲛ.
Ⲫⲏⲉⲧⲱ̀ⲗⲓ ⲙ̀ⲫ̀ⲛⲟⲃⲓ ⲛ̀ⲧⲉ ⲡⲓⲕⲟⲥⲙⲟⲥ ϣⲉⲡ ⲛⲉⲛϯϩⲟ ⲉ̀ⲣⲟⲕ. Ⲫⲏⲉⲧϩⲉⲙⲥⲓ ⲥⲁⲟⲩⲓ̀ⲛⲁⲙ ⲙ̀Ⲡⲉϥⲓⲱⲧ ⲛⲁⲓ ⲛⲁⲛ.
Ⲛ̀ⲑⲟⲕ ⲙ̀ⲙⲁⲩⲁⲧⲕ ⲉⲑⲟⲩⲁⲃ: ⲛ̀ⲑⲟⲕ ⲙ̀ⲙⲁⲩⲁⲧⲕ ⲉⲧϭⲟⲥⲓ: Ⲡⲁϭⲟⲓⲥ Ⲓⲏⲥⲟⲩⲥ Ⲡⲓⲭ̀ⲣⲓⲥⲧⲟⲥ: ⲛⲉⲙ Ⲡⲓⲡ̀ⲛⲉⲩⲙⲁ Ⲉⲑⲟⲩⲁⲃ. Ⲉ̀ⲟⲩⲱ̀ⲟⲩ ⲙ̀Ⲫ̀ⲛⲟⲩϯ Ⲫ̀ⲓⲱⲧ. Ⲁ̀ⲙⲏⲛ.
Ϯⲛⲁⲥ̀ⲙⲟⲩ ⲉ̀ⲣⲟⲕ ⲙ̀ⲙⲏⲛⲓ ⲙ̀ⲙⲏⲛⲓ: ϯⲛⲁⲥ̀ⲙⲟⲩ ⲉ̀ⲡⲉⲕⲣⲁⲛ ⲉⲑⲟⲩⲁⲃ ϣⲁ ⲉ̀ⲛⲉϩ ⲛⲉⲙ ϣⲁ ⲉ̀ⲛⲉϩ ⲛ̀ⲧⲉ ⲛⲓⲉ̀ⲛⲉϩ. Ⲁ̀ⲙⲏⲛ.
Ⲓⲥϫⲉⲛ ϫⲱⲣϩ ⲁ̀ ⲡⲁⲡ̀ⲛⲉⲩⲙⲁ ϣⲱⲣⲡ ⲙ̀ⲙⲟϥ ϩⲁⲣⲟⲕ Ⲡⲁⲛⲟⲩϯ: ϫⲉ ϩⲁⲛⲟⲩⲱⲓⲛⲓ ⲛⲉ ⲛⲉⲕⲟⲩⲁϩⲥⲁϩⲛⲓ ϩⲓϫⲉⲛ ⲡⲓⲕⲁϩⲓ.
Ⲛⲁⲓⲉⲣⲙⲉⲗⲉⲧⲁⲛ ϩⲓϫⲉⲛ ⲛⲉⲕⲙⲱⲓⲧ: ϫⲉ ⲁⲕϣⲱⲡⲓ ⲛⲏⲓ ⲛ̀ⲟⲩⲃⲟⲏ̀ⲑⲟⲥ. Ϩⲁⲛⲁ̀ⲧⲟⲟⲩⲓ̀ Ⲡ̀ϭⲟⲓⲥ ⲉⲕⲉ̀ⲥⲱⲧⲉⲙ ⲉ̀ⲧ̀ⲥ̀ⲙⲏ: ϣⲱⲣⲡ ⲉⲓⲉ̀ⲧⲁϩⲟⲓ ⲛⲁϩⲣⲁⲕ ⲉⲕⲉ̀ⲛⲁⲩ ⲉ̀ⲣⲟⲓ.

Translation:

Let us praise with the angels saying, “Glory to God in the highest, peace on earth, and goodwill toward men.”
We praise You. We bless You. We serve You. We worship You. We confess to You. We proclaim Your glory. We thank You for Your great glory.
O Lord who reigns over the heavens, God the Father, the Almighty. O Lord, the one only-begotten Son, Jesus Christ, and the Holy Spirit.
O Lord God, Lamb of God, Son of the Father, who bears the sins of the world, have mercy on us.
O who bears the sins of the world, accept our supplications. O who sits at the right hand of His Father, have mercy on us.
You alone are holy; You alone are the Most High, my Lord Jesus Christ, and the Holy Spirit. Glory to God the Father. Amen.
Every day I will bless You and praise Your holy name forever and unto the ages of all ages. Amen.
Since the night my spirit seeks You early, O my God, for Your commandments are a light on the earth.
I continually pursue Your ways for You have become a help to me. In the morning You hear my voice. Early, I stand before You, and You see me.

== Present-day Latin text ==
Glória in excélsis Deo
et in terra pax homínibus bonæ voluntátis.
Laudámus te,
benedícimus te,
adorámus te,
glorificámus te,
grátias ágimus tibi propter magnam glóriam tuam,
Dómine Deus, Rex cæléstis,
Deus Pater omnípotens.

Dómine Fili Unigénite, Iesu Christe,
Dómine Deus, Agnus Dei, Fílius Patris,
qui tollis peccáta mundi,
miserére nobis;
qui tollis peccáta mundi,
súscipe deprecatiónem nostram.
Qui sedes ad déxteram Patris,
miserére nobis.

Quóniam tu solus Sanctus,
tu solus Dóminus,
tu solus Altíssimus,
Iesu Christe,
cum Sancto Spíritu:
in glória Dei Patris.
Amen.

Translation:

Glory to God in the highest,
and on earth peace to people of good will.
We praise you,
we bless you,
we adore you,
we glorify you,
we give you thanks for your great glory,
Lord God, heavenly King,
O God, almighty Father.

Lord Jesus Christ, Only Begotten Son,
Lord God, Lamb of God, Son of the Father,
you take away the sins of the world,
have mercy on us;
you take away the sins of the world,
receive our prayer;
you are seated at the right hand of the Father,
have mercy on us.

For you alone are the Holy One,
you alone are the Lord,
you alone are the Most High,
Jesus Christ,
with the Holy Spirit,
in the glory of God the Father.
Amen.

== Liturgical use ==
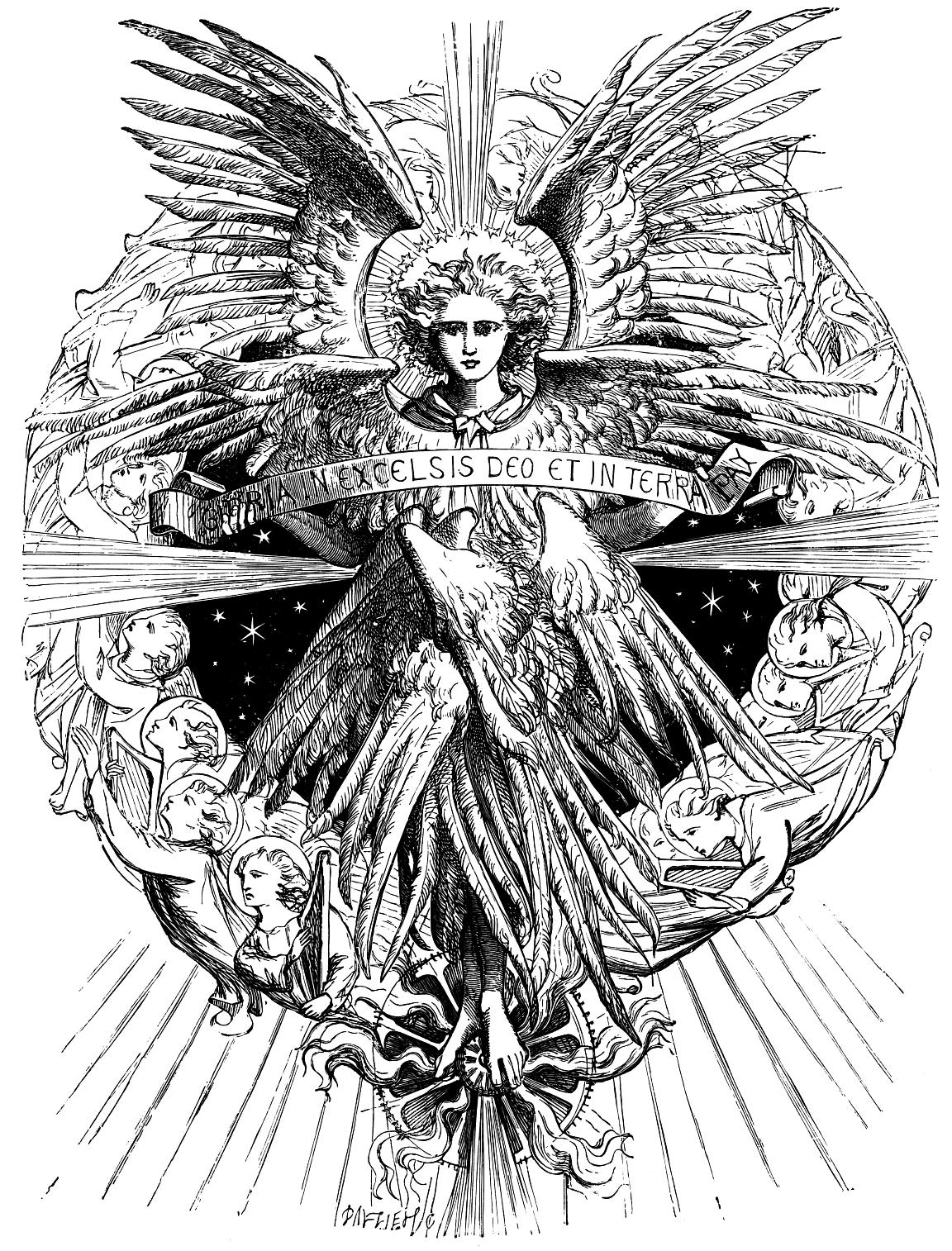
Angel with the words "Gloria in Excelsis Deo et in terra pax" by Dalziel Brothers

=== Byzantine Rite ===
In the Byzantine Rite (used by the Eastern Orthodox and Byzantine Catholic Churches), the Gloria is referred to as the Doxology, and there are two forms: the Greater Doxology and the Lesser Doxology. The Greater Doxology is always sung, whereas the Lesser Doxology is read. There are certain textual differences between the two, and the order is somewhat altered in the two forms.

The Greater Doxology is used in the Orthros (Matins) on Sundays and feast days. The Lesser Doxology is used at Matins on simple weekdays and at the Apodeipnon (Compline), but not in the Divine Liturgy.

=== Alexandrine Rite ===
In the Alexandrine Rite (used by the Coptic Orthodox Church and some other Oriental Orthodox Churches), the Gloria is a common congregational prayer, sometime referred to as the "Praise of the Angels". It is recited collectively by the congregation during the Morning Raising of Incense, as well as at the Matins prayer of the Agpeya (the Alexandrian Canonical Book of the Hours). The first verse of the hymn is also recited at the dismissal of the Divine Liturgy before the chanting of the "Concluding Canon".

=== Roman Rite ===
By contrast, in the Roman Rite this hymn is not included in the Liturgy of the Hours, but is sung or recited at Mass, after the Kyrie, on Sundays outside of Lent and Advent, during the octaves of Easter and Christmas, and on solemnities and feasts.

In Masses celebrated in accordance with the 1962 Roman Missal (authorized as an extraordinary form of the Roman Rite), the Gloria is sung much more frequently: the 1960 Code of Rubrics require it at Mass when in the corresponding Office of the day the Te Deum is said at Matins. It is thus used not only on I and II-class feasts (corresponding to solemnities and feasts in the post-Vatican II Mass) but also on III-class feasts (corresponding to memorials in the later form). In the 1962 form it is also said on ferias of Christmastide and Paschaltide even outside the octaves, but is omitted during the Septuagesima season, which does not exist in the post-Vatican II liturgy. The Gloria is also sung in both the pre-Vatican II and in the later form of the Roman Rite at the Mass of the Lord's Supper in the evening of Maundy Thursday and at the Easter Vigil.

A tradition recorded in the Liber Pontificalis attributes to Pope Telesphorus (128–139?) the use of the hymn at the Mass of Christmas Day and to Pope Symmachus (498–514) its use on Sundays and the feasts of martyrs, but only by bishops; the right to use it was later extended to priests, at first only at Easter and on the day of their ordination, but by the end of the 11th century priests, as well as bishops, used it in the Mass on Sundays and feasts outside of Lent and Pre-Lent. After the 12th century Advent began to be considered a penitential period in imitation of Lent, to the exclusion therefore of the Gloria in excelsis Deo.

=== West Syriac Rite ===
In the Syriac Orthodox Church this hymn is known as Teshbuhto d'malakhe ("Praise of the Angels"). This hymn is sung everyday at the end of the canonical prayers (shimo) of midnight; known as Lilyo (Matins).

Towards the end of the matins (Lilyo) the celebrant chants: "As the angels and archangels on high in heaven sing praise, so we poor children of earth sing praise and say: At all times and at all seasons:"

In response the congregation and the choir chants the above "teshbuhto d'malakhe" (Great Doxology) hymn.

=== Lutheran Rite ===
The hymn is used in the Divine Service of the Lutheran Churches.

=== Anglican use ===
In the Church of England's 1549 edition of the Book of Common Prayer, it was used in the same position as in the Roman Rite but was later moved to the end of the service, immediately before the concluding blessing. Revisions to the Prayer Book produced the 1552 prayer book and later the 1662 prayer book, but this placement was retained by the Anglican Communion until the 20th century. Common Worship provides two Orders, one of which places the hymn in the earlier position.

The 1789 Protestant Episcopal Church in the United States of America prayer book placed the Gloria at the end of the psalms in Morning Prayer and Evening Prayer as an option in place of the Gloria Patri and also placed the Gloria at the end of the holy Eucharist (like the 1662 prayer book). The 1928 version removed the Gloria from Morning Prayer but retained it in Evening Prayer. This 1928 edition is still the standard in the breakaway Continuing Anglican churches. The Episcopal Church's 1979 Book moved it to the beginning, after or in place of the Kyrie in Rite One. In a Rite Two (i.e., contemporary language) service of Holy Eucharist, the Gloria, or another song of praise, is sung or said on all Sundays except those in Advent or Lent. It may also be used at other times as desired excepting Lent and Advent.

== Associated ceremonial ==
=== Roman Rite ===
In the Tridentine Mass, the priest is instructed, when saying the opening phrase "Gloria in excelsis Deo", to extend his hands and raise them to shoulder height and, at the word "Deo", to join them and bow his head. He is then to continue the recitation standing erect with hands joined and bowing his head to the cross at the words "Adoramus te", "Gratias agimus tibi", "Iesu Christe" (twice), and "Suscipe deprecationem nostram", and at the concluding phrase (as also at the concluding phrase of the Nicene Creed and the Sanctus), to make a large sign of the cross on himself. At High Mass the priest intones the opening phrase, while the deacon and subdeacon stand behind him; then they join him at the altar and together with him quietly recite the rest of the hymn, after which they sit down and wait for the choir to finish its singing of the same text.

The Roman Missal as revised in 1970 simplifies this, saying: "The Gloria is intoned by the priest or, if appropriate, by a cantor or by the choir; but it is sung either by everyone together, or by the people alternately with the choir, or by the choir alone. If not sung, it is to be recited either by all together or by two parts of the congregation responding one to the other." No particular ritual gestures are prescribed.

=== Byzantine Rite ===
In the usage of the Eastern Orthodox Church and those Eastern Catholic Churches which follow the Byzantine Rite, the Great Doxology is one of the high points of the festal Matins service. The priest puts on his phelonion (chasuble). When it comes time for the Great Doxology the deacon opens the Holy Doors, and the priest raises his hands orans and exclaims: "Glory to Thee, Who hast shown us the Light!", and the choir begins chanting the Doxology, while all of the oil lamps and candles in the temple are lit. The Great Doxology concludes with the chanting of the Trisagion and leads into the chanting of the Troparion of the Day. If the bishop is present he vests in his full pontifical vestments for the Great Doxology, and the subdeacons stand behind the Holy Table (altar) holding the lit dikirion and trikirion.

When the Lesser Doxology is called for, it is simply said by the reader, the priest does not put on his phelonion, the Holy Doors remain closed and no lamps or candles are lit. The Lesser Doxology does not end with the Trisagion and is followed by an ektenia (litany).

In liturgical calendars it is symbolized by a red mis-shapen semicircle (with the opening to one side) with three dots inside.

== Musical settings ==
The Gloria has been and still is sung to a wide variety of melodies. Modern scholars have catalogued well over two hundred of them used in the medieval church. The Roman Missal indicates several different plainchant melodies. In addition, several "farced" Glorias were composed in the Middle Ages and were still sung in places when the Roman Missal was revised by order of Pope Pius V in 1570. These expanded the basic Gloria by, for instance, adding to mentions of Jesus Christ a mention of some relationship between him and his mother. The use of these additional phrases in honour of the Blessed Virgin Mary was so common that in editions of the Roman Missal earlier than the 1921 revision, the text of the Gloria was followed by the rubric: "Sic dicitur Gloria in excelsis Deo, etiam in Missis beatæ Mariæ, quando dicenda est" (When the Gloria in excelsis Deo is to be recited, it is recited in this way, even in Masses of Blessed Mary).

Almost all polyphonic settings of the Mass include the Gloria. In addition, there are a number of settings of the Gloria alone, including:

- J. S. Bach, one setting (BWV 191), with the Gloria Patri appended.
- Antonio Vivaldi, who wrote two Glorias that survived: the widely recorded RV 589, and the less famous RV 588
- George Frideric Handel, whose setting for solo soprano and strings was rediscovered in 2001: Gloria
- Camille Saint-Saëns
- Francis Poulenc: Gloria
- William Walton
- John Rutter: Gloria
- Mike Anderson: Gloria
- Karl Jenkins, who interpolates other texts alongside the standard Gloria text: Gloria

A paraphrase of the text in German, the early Lutheran hymn Allein Gott in der Höh sei Ehr, has also been commonly set to music, in the form of chorale preludes or as part of larger compositions. The free paraphrase "Ich lobe meinen Gott, der aus der Tiefe mich holt" became a 1979 hymn of the genre Neues Geistliches Lied, similarly "Ich lobe meinen Gott von ganzem Herzen" the same year.

The popular Christmas carol "Angels We Have Heard on High" is derived from the beginning of the Gloria, which it uses as a refrain. It has been translated into several languages.

The first phrase is also present in Bladee and Ecco2k's track '5 Star Crest (4 Vattenrum)' from their collaborative album Crest.

== Some official English translations ==
Book of Common Prayer (1662)

Glory be to God on high
And in earth peace, goodwill towards men,

We praise thee, we bless thee,
we worship thee, we glorify thee,
we give thanks to thee, for thy great glory
O Lord God, heavenly King,
God the Father Almighty.

O Lord, the only-begotten Son, Jesu Christ;
O Lord God, Lamb of God, Son of the Father,
that takest away the sins of the world,
have mercy upon us.
Thou that takest away the sins of the world,
have mercy upon us.
Thou that takest away the sins of the world,
receive our prayer.
Thou that sittest at the right hand of God the Father,
have mercy upon us.

For thou only art holy;
thou only art the Lord;
thou only, O Christ,
with the Holy Ghost,
art most high
in the glory of God the Father.
Amen.

ICET ecumenical version (1975)

Glory to God in the highest
and peace to his people on earth.
Lord God, heavenly King,
Almighty God and Father,
we worship you, we give you thanks,
we praise you for your glory.
Lord Jesus Christ, only Son of the Father,
Lord God, Lamb of God,
you take away the sin of the world:
have mercy on us;
You are seated at the right hand of the Father:
receive our prayer.
For you alone are the Holy One,
you alone are the Lord,
you alone are the Most High,
Jesus Christ,
with the Holy Spirit,
in the glory of God the Father. Amen.

Ecumenical Patriarchate of Constantinople New Rome, Archdiocese of Thyateira and Great Britain

Glory to God in the highest, and on earth peace, goodwill among men.
We praise you, we bless you, we worship you, we glorify you, we give you thanks for your great glory.
Lord, King, God of heaven, Father almighty: Lord, only-begotten Son, Jesus Christ and Holy Spirit.
Lord God, Lamb of God, Son of the Father, who take away the sin of the world, have mercy on us; you take away the sins of the world.
Receive our prayer, you who sit on the right hand of the Father, and have mercy on us.
For you alone are holy, you alone are Lord, Jesus Christ, to the glory of God the Father. Amen.

== See also ==
- Phos Hilaron
- Te Deum
- Alleluia
- Tract (liturgy)
