= Christa Blanke =

German Lutheran theologian

Christa Blanke-Weckbach
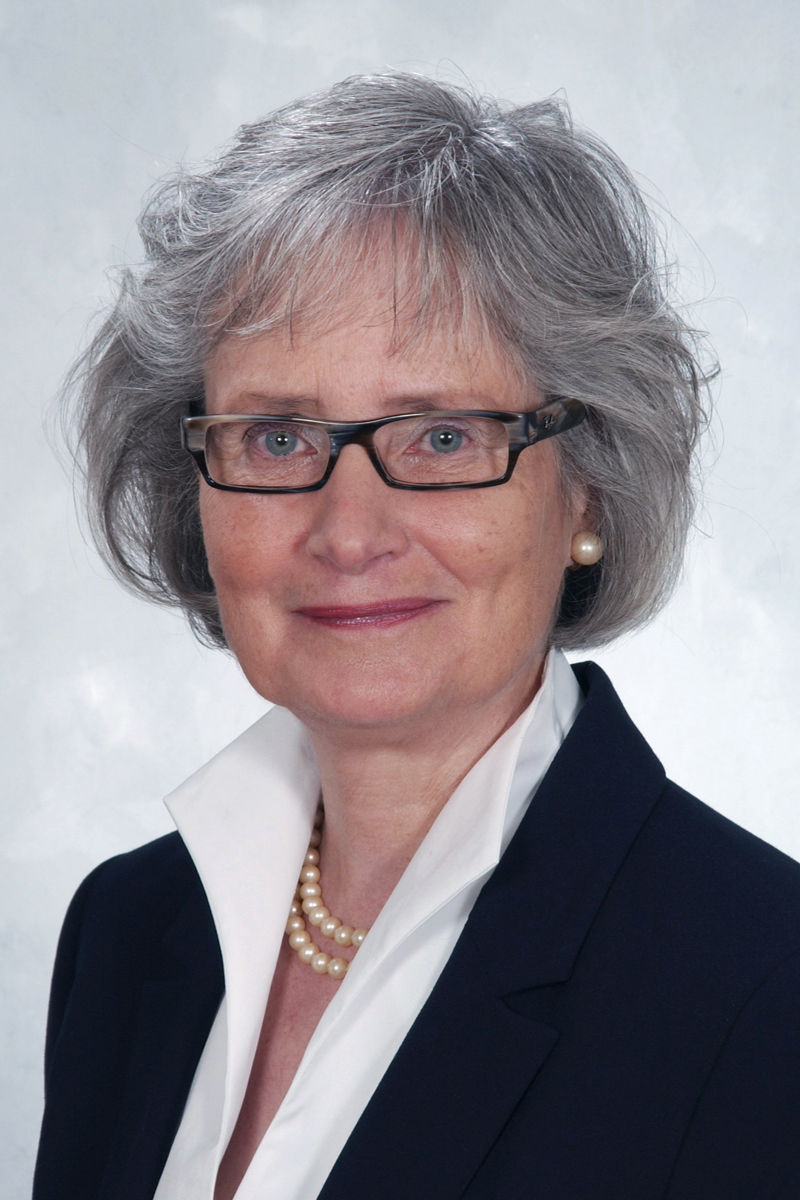
- Born: September 18, 1948 (age 78); Giessen
- Occupation: Theologian

Rev. Christa Blanke-Weckbach (born September 18, 1948 in Giessen, Germany) is a German Lutheran theologian and animal welfare activist. She is the founder of the European animal protection organisation Animals' Angels. From 1995 to 1998 she chaired the animal welfare advisory board of the government of Hesse.

== Biography ==
Christa Blanke was born in Giessen in 1948. She spent her youth in Frankfurt, where she attended high school and was involved in the protestant youth groups. From 1966 to 1972 she studied protestant theology at the universities of Hamburg, Heidelberg and Frankfurt. In 1971–2, together with other theologians she was an organiser of the pilot project set up in Hamburg by Helmut Thielicke, Faith Info (since renamed Different Times). After serving as curate for the German speaking congregation in Edinburgh, Scotland, in 1972 she was appointed vicar/curate to a protestant parish in Offenbach am Main. From 1978 until 1999 Christa Blanke and her family lived in the village of Glauberg, where she worked as a psychotherapist in private practice, as supervisor for the Samaritans in the city of Hanau and also on honorary basis for the Glauberg parish, where her husband was rector.

Christa Blanke began working for animal protection from the mid-1980s. To draw attention to the suffering of laboratory animals at Hoechst's Frankfurt chemical plant, she conducted a media covered church service in 1986 in full view of the factory windows, under the slogan "Hoechst, have mercy!". In 1987 she celebrated a church service, with animals present, on Frankfurt's Römerberg in front of the town hall. In the same year, she collected 13,000 signatures on a petition addressed to the Protestant Church in Hesse and Nassau, asking that no eggs from hens in battery cages be used in church establishments. In 1988 she celebrated the first animal service in Glauberg parish church, an event which was broadcast live on the German ZDF television channel. In 1988 Christa Blanke and her husband, the Reverend Michael Blanke, formulated the Glauberg Confession and together they created AKUT – Aktion Kirche und Tiere – in 1989 to advocate the rights of animals within the Church. In 1995, thanks to reports in the media, Christa Blanke became aware of the suffering involved in the transport of animals throughout Europe. In 1998 she founded the animal protection society Animals' Angels which under her leadership became internationally known as the only organisation focusing on the protection of animals during transport.

In 1987 Christa Blanke and Michael Blanke wrote the book for the musical Jesus, One of Us; the composer Peter Janssens wrote the music. The musical was performed at the Alte Oper in Frankfurt and elsewhere.

In 1995 Christa Blanke was instrumental in setting up the sculpture Arche Schöpfung by German sculptor Gustav Nonnenmacher at Glauberg parish church.

In 2008 Christa Blanke founded the first German refuge for spent dairy cows. In 2011 she was a leading light in the Europe-wide 8hours Campaign and petition, which collected 1.2 million signatures from citizens demanding a limit of 8 hours journey time for animals transported for slaughter within the EU.

In 2015 under the aegis of Animals’ Angels, Christa Blanke created the website Animal Memorial. The site honours the memory of some of the farm animals the Animals’ Angels teams have met in the course of their investigations worldwide. Each animal's photograph and name are recorded.

== Awards and honors ==
- 1999: Honour prize of Hans-Rönn-Stiftung
- October 1999: Franziskuspreis
- November 1999: Hessischer Tierschutzpreis
- February 2001: Lord Houghton Award
- 2003: Marchig Trust Animal Welfare Award
- October 2004: Karl-Adolf-Laubscher-Preis
- 2008: Order of Merit of the Federal Republic of Germany
- 2010: EUROGROUP-Award
- 2010: Fairness-Award by Cavallo
- 2019: St. Francis Award by Catholic Concern for Animals

== Publications ==
- Kleine Pferde – großes Glück. Liebesbriefe um Ponys. Mueller Rueschlikon Verlag, 1968.
- Da krähte der Hahn – Kirche für Tiere? Eine Streitschrift. Verlag am Eschbach, Eschbach/Markgräflerland 1995; ISBN 3-88671-159-5.
- Mit den Augen der Liebe – Wir sind bei den Tieren. Ein Tagebuch der Hoffnung. Animals’ Angels Press, 2011; ISBN 978-3-9814946-0-0:
  - Italian edition: Con gli occhi dell’amore – Siamo con gli animali. Un diario della speranza. Animals’ Angels Press, 2013; ISBN 978-3-9814946-5-5;
  - English edition: With the Eyes of Love – We are there with the animals. Dispatches from the front line. Animals’ Angels Press, 2012; ISBN 978-3-9814946-4-8;
  - Spanish edition: Con los ojos del Amor - Diario desde las trincheras Estamos ahí con los animales. Animals’ Angels Press, 2014.
- 8 hours is more than enough! Europe calls for an end to long-distance transports of live animals. Animals’ Angels Press, 2012; ISBN 978-3-9814946-6-2.
- Let my People go - Claiming the Bible for the Animals. Animals’ Angels Press, 2013; ISBN 978-3-9814946-6-2.
- Tierschutz in Deutschland. Eine Gutachtensammlung. Animals’ Angels Press, 2014; ISBN 978-3-9816696-0-2.
