= Wo Menschen sich vergessen =

Christian hymn

- Christian hymn
- English: Where people forget themselves
- Other name: Da berühren sich Himmel und Erde
- Written: 1989
- Text: Thomas Laubach
- Language: German
- Melody: Christoph Lehmann
- Composed: 1989

"Wo Menschen sich vergessen" (Where people forget themselves) is a Christian hymn in German, with text written in 1989 by Thomas Laubach and with music by Christoph Lehmann. The hymn of the genre Neues Geistliches Lied (NGL) is also known by the beginning of the refrain, "Da berühren sich Himmel und Erde" (There heaven and earth touch each other). It appears in regional sections of the 2013 hymnal Gotteslob, and in other songbooks.

== History ==
The Catholic German theologian Thomas Laubach wrote the text of "Wo Menschen sich vergessen" in 1989. It is in three stanzas, each with a verse of three lines followed by a refrain. The hymn is part of regional sections of the German common Catholic hymnal Gotteslob, such as in Limburg as GL 858. The hymn is also contained in other songbooks.

== Text and theme ==
The song is in three stanzas, each with a verse of three lines followed by a refrain: "da berühren sich Himmel und Erde, dass Frieden werde unter uns" (there heaven and earth touch each other so that peace may happen among us). The three verses mention conditions for that kind of peace, each concluding "und neu beginnen, ganz neu" (and begin newly, really newly).

== Melody ==
The melody in F major, written by Christoph Lehmann in 1989, follows the text in irregular, at times short phrases. The highest note is reached for "heaven", the lowest for "earth", and the key word "peace" is accented by a triplet. The text of the refrain appears twice, slightly changed the second time.

== Usage ==
The song, with its focus on a beginning, is frequently chosen for weddings and church meetings. In 2017, when 500 years of the Reformation were celebrated, it was part of the service on Ascension Day of the Evangelischer Kirchentag Berlin–Wittenberg, held open air and broadcast live by the ARD. The hymn was performed as the first song in the opening service of the Ökumenischer Kirchentag 2021 (Ecumenical Church Assembly) in Frankfurt on Ascension Day open air as a livestream event due to the COVID-19 pandemic, with the city skyline and the Paulskirche as a background.

In a survey among prominent people for their favourite song after Gotteslob appeared in 2013, the song was named by Malu Dreyer, minister-president of Rhineland-Palatinate.
