= Jetzt ist die Zeit =

Christian offertory hymn

- Christian hymn
- English: Now is the time
- Text: by Alois Albrecht
- Language: German
- Melody: by Ludger Edelkötter
- Composed: 1972
- Published: 1975

"Jetzt ist die Zeit" (Now is the time) is a Christian hymn with words by Alois Albrecht and music by Ludger Edelkötter. The song of the genre Neues Geistliches Lied (NGL) has appeared in German hymnals and songbooks.

== History ==
Alois Albrecht a former vicar general of the Catholic Archdiocese of Bamberg (Germany), wrote the words of the hymn and the music educator Ludger Edelkötter was its composer. The work has appeared in twelve songbooks.

== Text ==
The text begins with a short refrain, and has eight stanzas. That refrain claims the critical time to be now, and that we do or miss it today. The premise is the apocalyptic Second Coming of Jesus, and the stanzas give details of questions his audience of siblings will have to face then, disqualifying queries that do not matter. In the first stanza, the questions that will not come are "Was hast du gespart?" (What did you save?) and "Was hast du alles besessen?" (What did you own?), but: "Was hast du geschenkt?" (What did you give?) and "Wen hast du geschätzt?" (Whom did you cherish?) Each stanza but the last ends with "um meinetwillen" (for my sake).
