= Offertory =

Part of a Eucharistic service

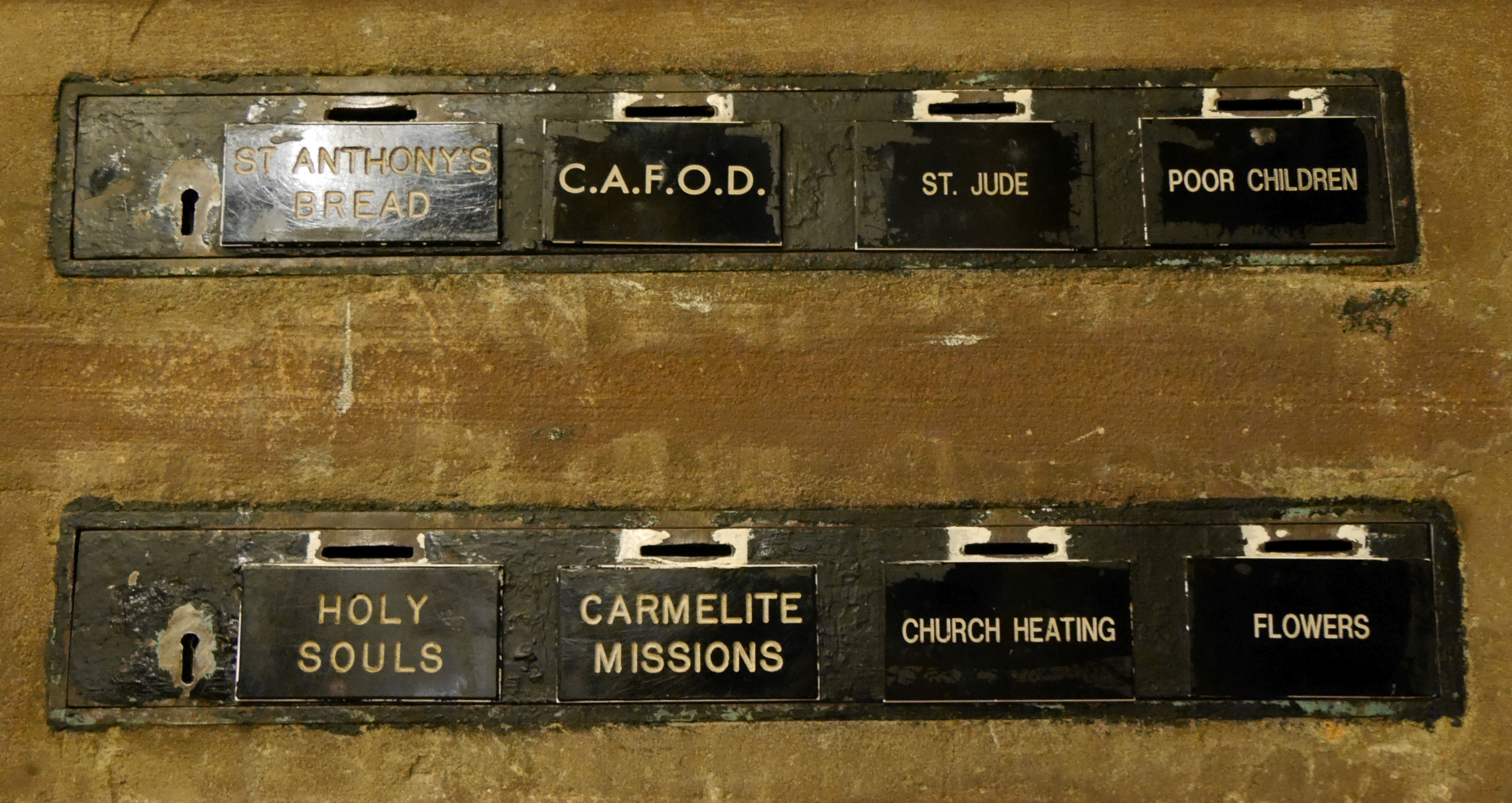
Collection boxes, Our Lady of Mount Carmel and St Simon Stock, Kensington, London

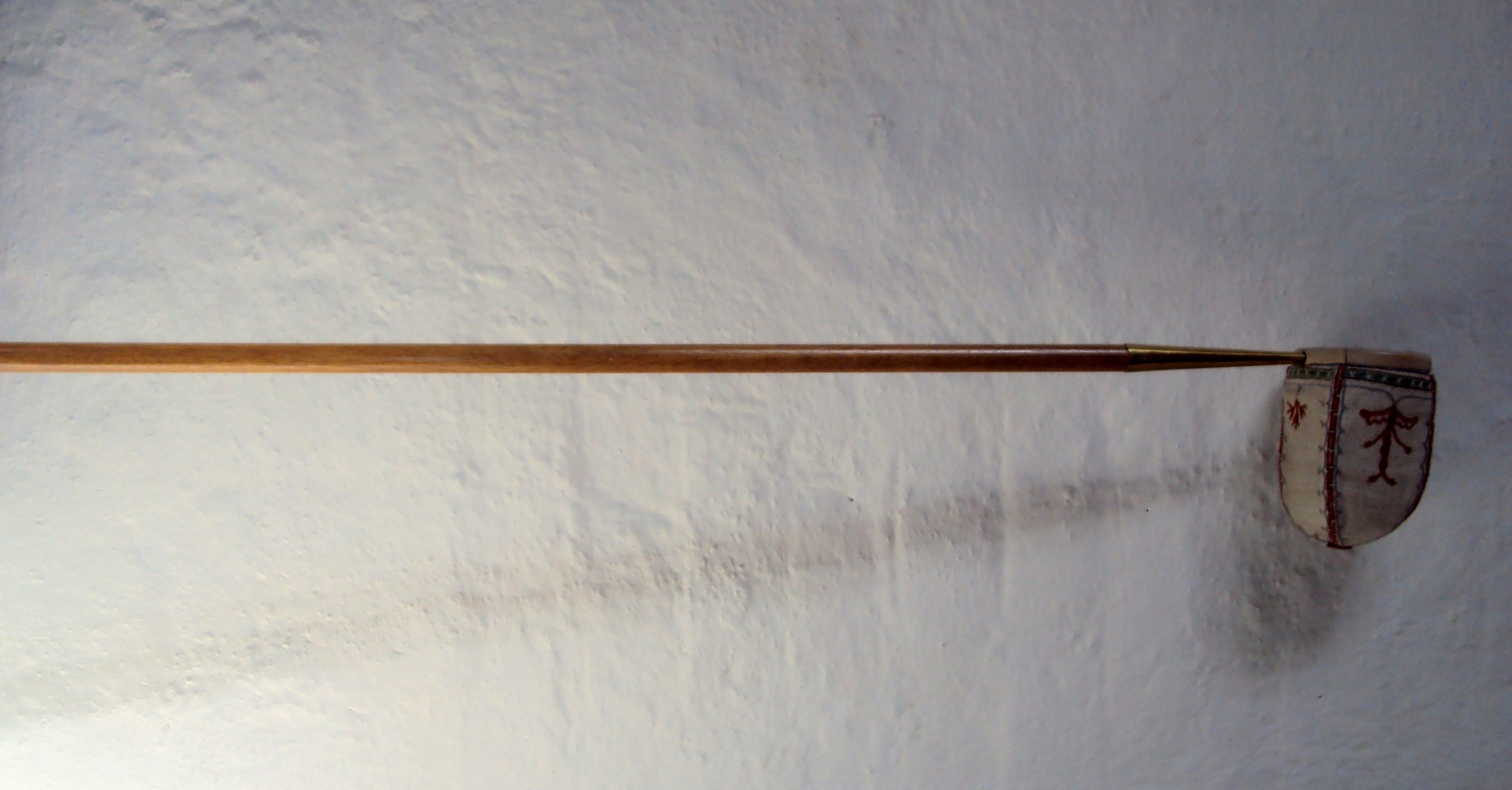
Collection bag used in Fru Alstad Church

The offertory (from Medieval Latin offertorium and Late Latin offerre) is the part of a Eucharistic service when the bread and wine for use in the service are ceremonially placed on the altar.

A collection of alms (offerings) from the congregation, which may take place also at non-Eucharistic services, often coincides with this ceremony.

The Eucharistic theology may vary among those Christian denominations that have a liturgical offertory.

In the Roman Rite, the term "Preparation of the Gifts" is used in addition to the term "Offertory" (both capitalized) or, rather, the term "Preparation of the Gifts" is used for the action of the priest, while the term "Offertory" is used for the section of the Mass at which this action is performed in particular when speaking of the accompanying chant. In the Lutheran Mass, the Offertory includes the presentation of the eucharistic gifts at the altar by the churchwardens, the bringing up of the collection to the altar, and the prayer of the priest (pastor): "Receive us and our gifts for the sake of Jesus Christ".

In Baptist churches, the offertory refers to the part of the service of worship in which collection plates or baskets are distributed by ushers, with the tithes and offerings subsequently being brought to the chancel.

Offertory hymns are often sung during preparation and collection.

== Liturgical action ==
In the Roman Rite, the offertory is the first part of the Liturgy of the Eucharist. The altar is first prepared by placing on it the corporal, purificator, missal and chalice. The bread and wine, and perhaps other offerings or gifts for the poor or for the Church, are presented by the faithful in a procession to the accompaniment of an offertory chant. The priest places first the bread and then the wine on the altar while saying the prescribed prayers, after which he may incense them together with the cross and the altar. The priest and the people may also be incensed. After washing his hands at the side of the altar, the priest says the Prayer over the Offerings. This was originally the only prayer said at the offertory of the Roman Rite.

There are variations in other rites. For instance, in the Dominican Rite a single prayer was said at the offertory over the bread and wine, which have already been prepared on the altar at an earlier part of the Mass.

In the Byzantine Rite, there is a short offertory at the same point as in the Roman Rite. A more elaborate ceremonial, the Liturgy of Preparation, takes place before the public part of the celebration of the Divine Liturgy.

== Music ==
In the Roman Rite, the procession bringing the gifts is accompanied by the Offertory Chant, and singing may accompany the offertory even if there is no procession. Before 1970, the priest said the Prayer over the Offerings silently because during the offertory the people, at an earlier time, sang a psalm or, in responsorial fashion, repeated a refrain while a soloist sang the verses of the psalm. In the Tridentine Mass, only the choir sang the refrain alone to an elaborate setting. The priest read the refrain at the beginning of the offertory not only at a Low Mass, which was without singing, but also at a Solemn Mass.

The 1662 Book of Common Prayer of the Church of England includes "offertory sentences" which are to be read at this point. Current practice in Anglican churches favours the singing of a congregational hymn (the "offertory hymn") or an anthem sung by the choir, and often both. In some churches music at the offertory is provided by an organist.

The offertory hymn in the Latin Mass for the Dead (Requiem) is "Domine Iesu Christe". It has been set by many composers.

"Herr, wir bringen in Brot und Wein" (Lord, we bring in bread and wine) is a 1970 offertory hymn in German, based on a Dutch text. Another hymn in that style is "Alle Menschen höret auf dies neue Lied", written in Dutch in 1966 and translated into German in 1972. Also in 1972, Lothar Zenetti wrote the hymn "Das eine Brot wächst auf vielen Halmen". In 2009, Raymund Weber wrote a German text, "Nimm, o Gott, die Gaben, die wir bringen", to a melody from Andrew Lloyd Webber's musical Jesus Christ Superstar.

== Collection of alms ==
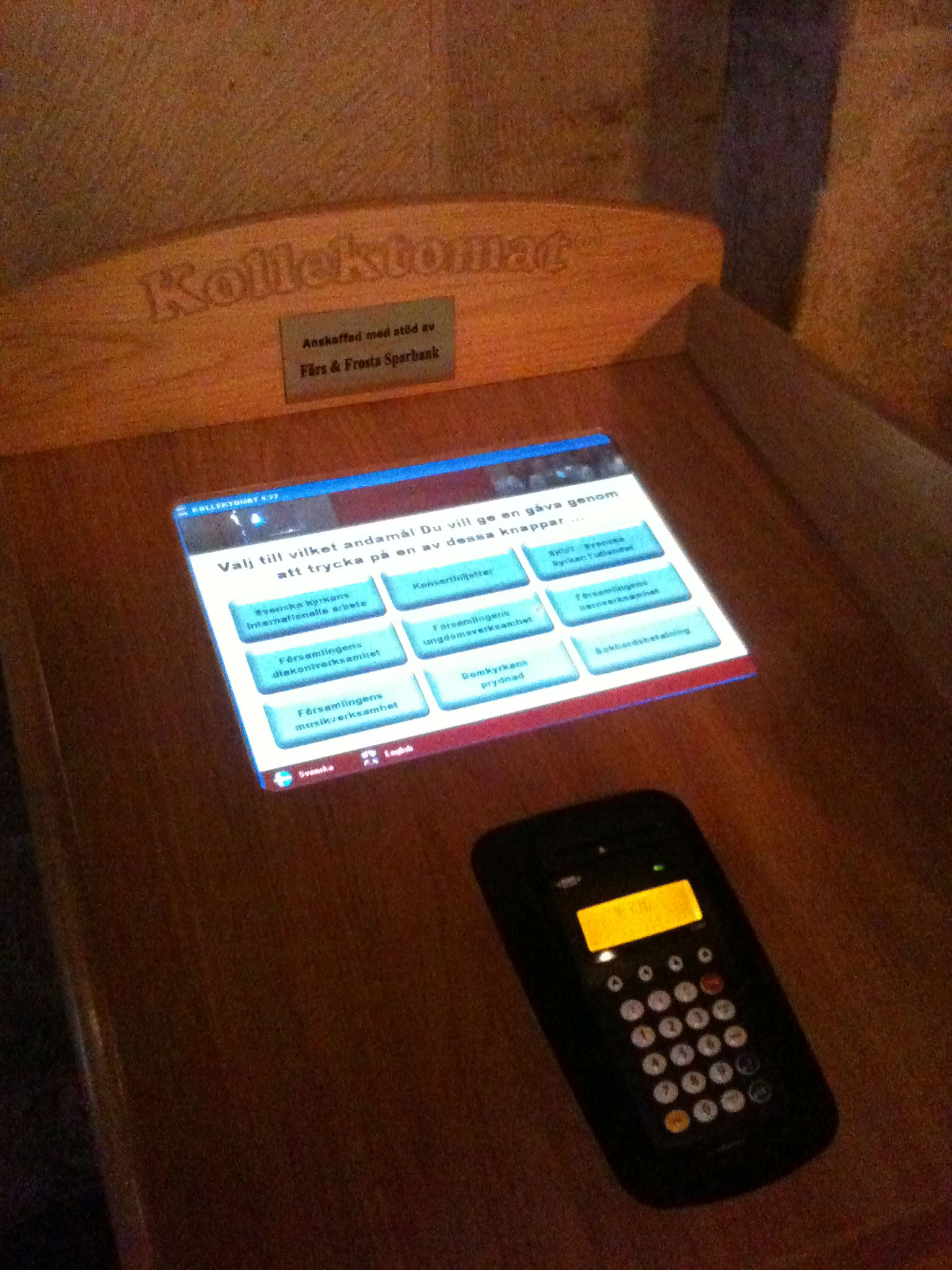
Kollektomat (collectomat), an automatic offertory machine with a card reader in Lund Cathedral, Sweden

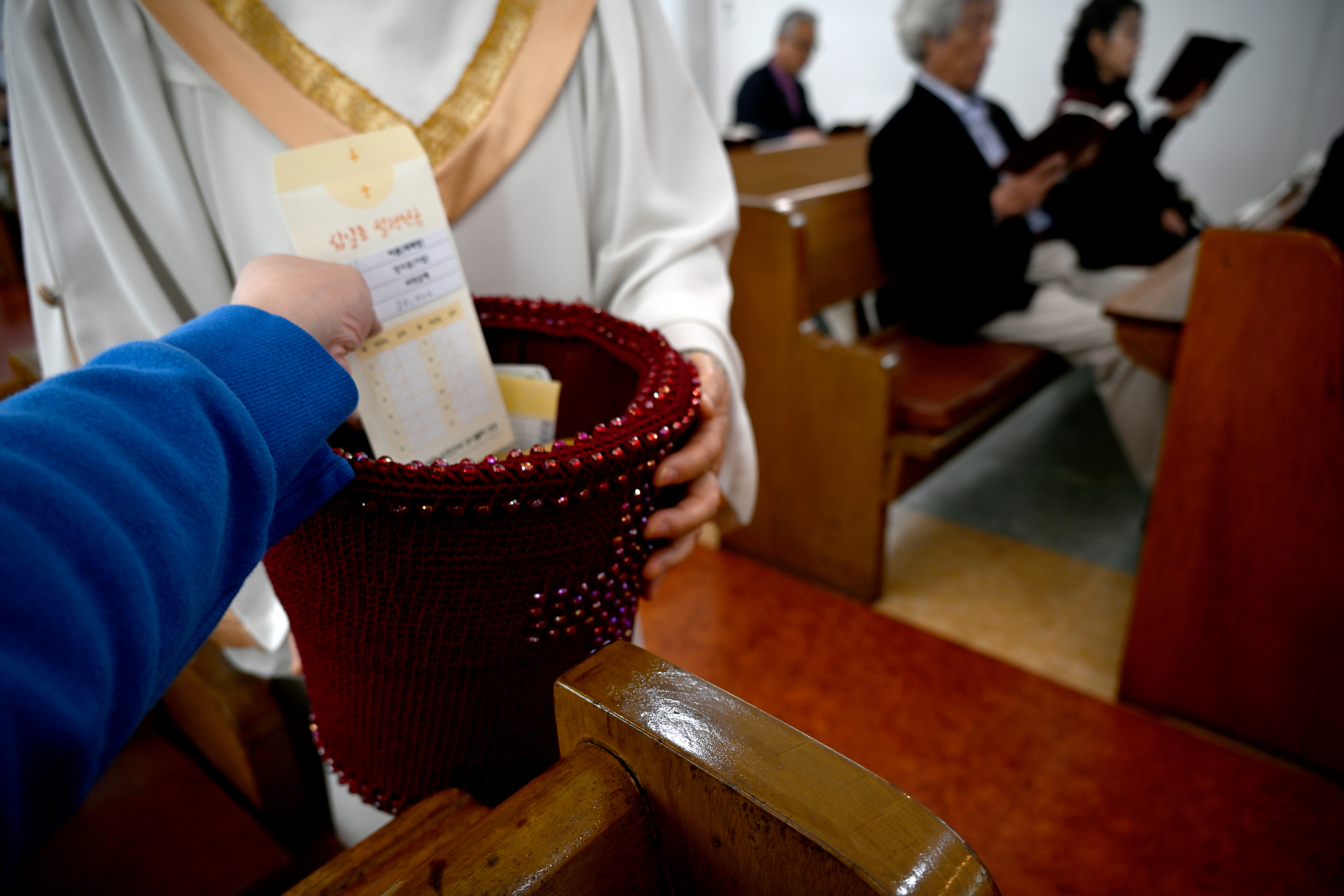
Offering bags used in the Anglican Church of Korea

In Justin Martyr's First Apology, dated between AD 155–157, he writes that "at a certain point in the celebration":

"they who are well-to-do, and willing, give what each thinks fit; and what is collected is deposited with the president, who succors the orphans and widows, and those who, through sickness or any other cause, are in want, and those who are in bonds, and the strangers sojourning among us, and in a word takes care of all who are in need".

In traditional forms of Christianity, a tithe (the first tenth of one's income) is seen as what is owed to God, while alms (offerings) are anything contributed beyond that.

During the offertory or immediately before it, a collection of money or other gifts for the poor or for the church is taken up. In the Roman Rite of the Catholic Church, as well as the Lutheran Churches, these offerings may be brought forward together with the bread and wine, but they are to be placed "in a suitable place but away from the Eucharistic table".

In many Anglican, Baptist and Methodist churches, a collection plate, basket or bag is often used during the offertory to gather the gifts of the faithful (tithes and alms) for the support of the church and for charity. These may then be brought into the chancel.

A "second collection" to provide financial support to a particular good cause sometimes takes place at the end of a service. The second collection can, however, be collected during the service and also taken up during the offertory.

== See also ==
- Mite box – box used to collect offerings in some Christian churches
- Saisen – coin boxes in Japanese temples and shrines
- Tithe – a periodic donation to a church, originally ten percent of one's income
