= Peter Janssens =

German composer (1934–1998)

- Janssens, in the 1980s
- Born: 17 June 1934; Telgte, Germany
- Died: 24 December 1998 (aged 64); Telgte, Germany
- Education: Musikhochschule Köln
- Occupations: Musician; Composer; Academic teacher
- Organizations: Bad Hersfelder Festspiele; Folkwangschule; Kirchentag; TAKT
- Awards: Hersfeld-Preis; Peter-Janssens-Weg in Telgte

Peter Janssens (17 June 1934 – 24 December 1998) was a German musician and composer who wrote and performed incidental music for several theatres, and songs and musicals of the genre Neues Geistliches Lied, a pioneer of Sacropop. He worked at a German theatre in Buenos Aires, set several works by Ernesto Cardenal to music and composed in 1992 a passion music, in memory of 500 years after the European invasion in Latin America.

== Biography ==
Born in Telgte, Peter Janssens was the last of nine children and grew up in rural surroundings. He attended the gymnasium Paulinum in Münster. Janssens studied musicology, sociology and history at the Musikhochschule Köln, graduating as a music educator in 1958. He continued his studies from 1961 to 1964 at the University of Münster. He worked as répétiteur at the Theater Münster. From 1966, he composed incidental music for the Schauspielhaus Düsseldorf, the Deutsches Theater in Göttingen, Staatstheater Wiesbaden and the Staatstheater Darmstadt, among others. He was active at the Bad Hersfelder Festspiele, both in the direction and in performing his own pieces, In 1964/65, he was director of music, composer, pianist and actor at the Deutsche Kammerspiele in Buenos Aires. From 1966, he lectured on song and chanson at the Folkwangschule.

From 1962, Janssens composed religious songs of the genre later called Neues Geistliches Lied, beat masses and later musicals. He wrote numerous songs, children's songs such as "Herr Uklatsch", and musicals such as Dietrich Bonhoeffer – ein Leben im Widerstand (Dietrich Bonhoeffer – A Life in Resistance). He set music to texts by authors such as Alois Albrecht, Friedrich Karl Barth, Ernesto Cardenal, Jürgen Fliege, Rolf Krenzer and Wilhelm Willms. He introduced the term "Sacropop" to Germany, when in 1972 he subtitled his Menschensohn (Son of Man) Ein Sacro-Pop-Musical (A sacropop musical). From 1973, Janssens performed with his musical ensemble Gesangsorchester at the Kirchentag, first in Düsseldorf. In 1992, he wrote Passion der Eingeborenen (Passion of the Indigenous), related to 500 years after the European invasion in Latin America. He was a member of the association which is now the Textautoren- und Komponistengruppe (TAKT).

Janssens died in Telgte. His home town named a road after him on 17 June 2004, which would have been his 70th birthday.

== Awards ==
- 1971: Hersfeld-Preis

== Works ==
The German National Library holds 138 of his compositions, such as:

- Mit lauter Stimme ruf ich zum Herrn, 1965 (text: Romano Guardini)
- Überall wirkt Gottes Geist, 1966 (text: Lutz Hoffmann, Franz Mausberg, Karl Norres, Leo Schuhen)
- Heilig, heilig, heilig, Herr und Gott, 1969, from: Friedens-Messe (text: Helmut Virnekäs)
- Gute Nachricht für alle Völker, 1970 (text: Hans Bernhard Meyer)
- "Herr, wir bringen in Brot und Wein", 1970 (text: translation from Dutch)
- Singt dem Herrn alle Völker und Rassen
- Wir können nicht schweigen, 1970 (text: Bonner Theologen-Team R. Gille / P. Janssens / L. Pesch / R. Sonnen)
- "Wir haben einen Traum – Unser Leben sei ein Fest", 1972 (text by Albrecht, Josef Metternich, team)
- Gebet für Marilyn Monroe – Psalm 21, 1972 (text: Ernesto Cardenal)
- Menschensohn I and II, 1972, Ein Sacro-Pop-Musical (text: Karl Lenfers)
- Wir jagen die Räuber fort, 1972 (text: H. Scupin, Hildegard Wohlgemuth, u. a.)
- Wir hören schon die Musik, 1973 (Gesänge, by Ernesto Cardenal and Janssens)
- Die Bauernoper / Szenen aus dem deutschen Bauernkrieg (1525), 1973, by Yaak Karsunke and Janssens
- Ein Halleluja für dich, 1973 (texts by Albrecht)
- Fridolin und Kater Mau. 1973, children's musical (text: Werner Baer)
- Ihr seid meine Lieder, 1974 (prayers from the liturgy of the hours in texts by Albrecht)
- Ave Eva oder Der Fall Maria, 1974 (text: Wilhelm Willms)
- "Brot, das die Hoffnung nährt", 1974 (text: Willms)
- "Manchmal feiern wir mitten im Tag", 1974 (text by Albrecht)
- Willi Schlappohr, 1975, Musikspiel (text: Werner Baer)
- Fest der Hoffnung, 1976, songs to the Hungertuch from India (text: Wilhelm Willms)
- Circus Mensch, 1976, Ein musikalisches Spektakel (text: Wilhelm Willms)
- Break down the walls, 1976 (texts: Cardenal, Hans-Jürgen Netz, Wilhelm Willms and others)
- Die Statuten des Menschen, 1977 (Gesänge, by Thiago de Mello and Janssens)
- Der Herr ist mein Sinn, nie werde ich funktionieren, 1977 (text: Alois Albrecht, Yaak Karsunke and others)
- Unkraut Leben, 1977, songs for the Kirchentag in Berlin
- Wann kommt der Tag, 1978, songs for Advent and a cantata (texts: Friedrich Karl Barth, Ursula Barth, Peter Beier, Wilhelm Willms, and others)
- Franz von Assisi, 1978, Musikspiel (text: Wilhelm Wilms)
- Uns allen blüht der Tod, 1979, Ein Fest für die Lebenden (text: Friedrich Karl Barth, Peter Horst)
- Spielball Schöpfung, 1983, Ein Zweifel-Hoffnungsfest by H.-J. Eimüller and Janssens)
- Elisabeth von Thüringen, 1984, Musikspiel (text: Hermann Schulze-Berndt)
- Das Tierparlament, 1985, Musikspiel (text: Hermann Schulze-Berndt)
- Jesus, einer von uns, 1987, Musikspiel (text: Christa and Michael Blanke)
- "Selig seid ihr, wenn ihr einfach lebt", 1989 (text: Friedrich Karl Barth, Peter Horst})
- Ehrfurcht vor dem Leben (A Requiem for Albert Schweitzer, 1990 (text: Stephan Kiepe-Fahrenholz)
- Das Licht einer Kerze, songs for Advent and Christmas, 1991 (texts: Rolf Krenzer, Sybille Fritsch, Christine Heuser, Hans-Jürgen Netz, Stephan Kiepe-Fahrenholz)
- Mirjams Mose
- Gott zieht vor uns her (Mose and Joshua), 1991 (text: Rolf Krenzer) 1991, Musikspiel in four parts (text: Schall-Team)
- "Kerzen im Advent" ("Grüner Kranz mit roten Kerzen") (text: Rolf Krenzer)
- Neues Kolpinglied, 1991 (text: Hermann Schulze-Berndt)
- Passion der Eingeborenen, 1992, Ein Musik-Panorama über die Geschichte Lateinamerikas (1492–1992) (text: Stephan Kiepe-Fahrenholz)
- Auf Messers Schneide, old and new Kirchentag songs, 1992 (von Sybille Fritsch, Wilhelm Willms, Albrecht, Janssens and others)
- Kippe im Kopf, Müllkantate, 1992 (text: Stephan Kiepe-Fahrenholz)
- Kleiner Spatz von Irgendwo – Träum dir doch einen Drachen, 1992, 26 children's songs by Rolf Krenzer and Janssens
- Als Gott sein Kind zur Welt geschickt, 1992, ten songs for a nativity play, 1992 (text: Rolf Krenzer)
- Bye Bye Jona, 1992 (text: Rolf Krenzer)
- "Eines Tages kam einer", song (text by Albrecht)
- Obed, 1993, Kinderkirchentag Munich, songs by Rolf Krenzer and Janssens
- Der Turm, 1994 (Text: Rolf Krenzer)
- Meine Lieder, 1994, a hit selection of the song book by Janssens
- Dietrich Bonhoeffer, 1995 (text: Priska Beilharz)
- Tag für Tag und Jahr für Jahr, 1996, songs by Rolf Krenzer and Janssens for the Werkbuch of the same name, Lahn Verlag
- Hildegard von Bingen, 1997 (text: Jutta Richter)
- Es ist eine Mutter, Kirchentag in Leipzig 1997 (songs by Sybille Fritsch, Jutta Richter, Michael Blanke, Hans-Jürgen Netz und Janssens)
- Die Brücke fließt, Ein Singspiel über das Zusammenleben von drei Religionen, 1998 (text: Priska Beilharz)

== Filmography ==
- 1981: Tatort: Das Zittern der Tenöre (music and acting), director Hans Dieter Schwarze

== Literature ==
- Barbara Stühlmeyer, Ludger Stühlmeyer: the song Eines Tages kam einer, by Alois Albrecht and Peter Janssens. In: Das Leben singen. Verlag DeBehr, Radeberg 2011, ISBN 978-3-939241-24-9, pp. 87ff.
