= Alois Albrecht =

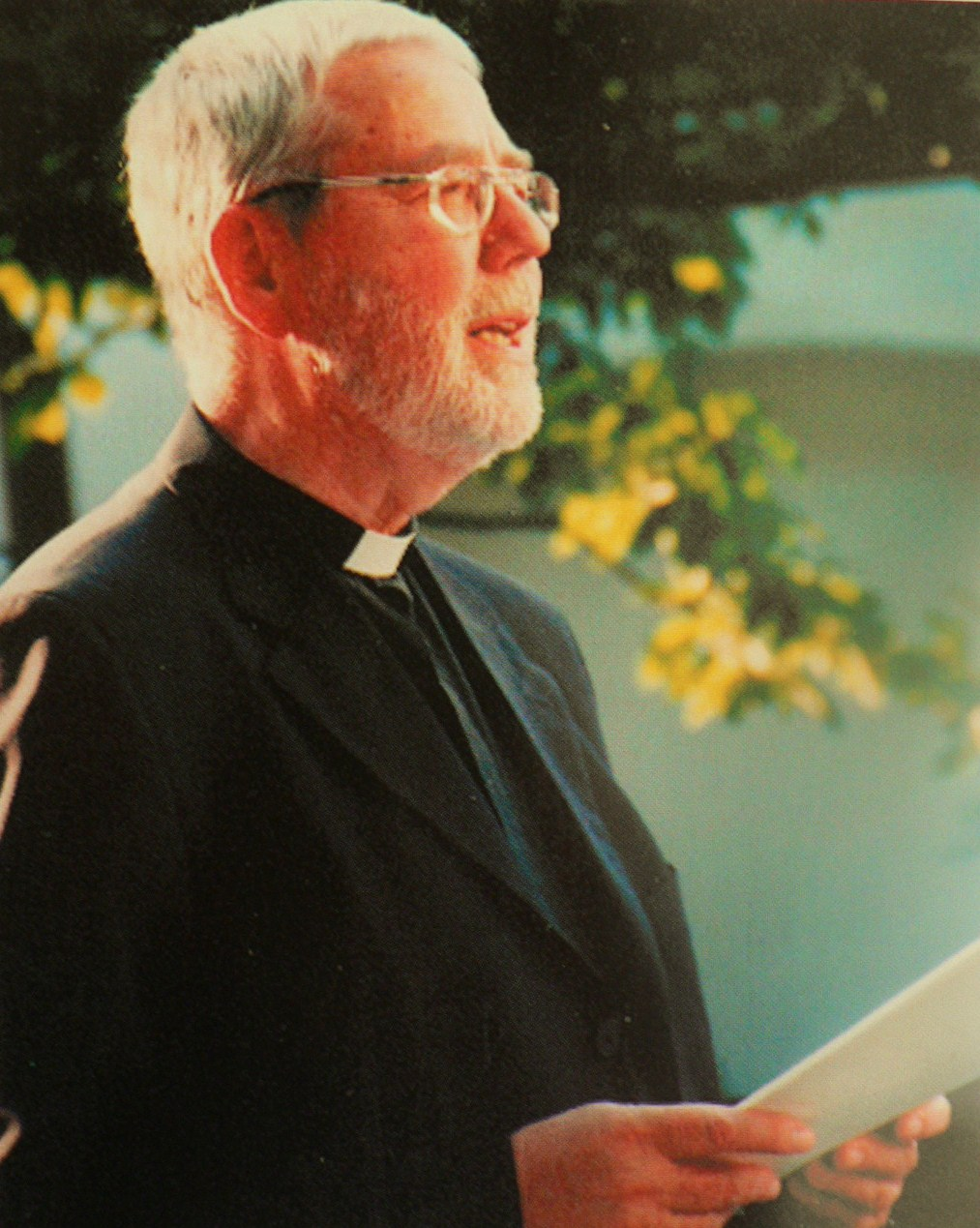
Albrecht in 2006

Alois Lorenz Albrecht (16 March 1936 ― 21 November 2022) was a German Catholic priest and hymnwriter. He served as vicar general of the Archdiocese of Bamberg.

== Life and career ==
Albrecht was born in Backnang on 16 March 1936 and grew up in Bayreuth. He achieved the Abitur at the Franz-Ludwig-Gymnasium Bamberg in Bamberg. He studied Catholic theology and philosophy at the Philosophisch-theologische Hochschule in Bamberg from 1956 to 1962. He was consecrated as a priest on 19 March 1962 by Bishop Josef Schneider. He worked first as chaplain in Höchstadt an der Aisch, and later in Nuremberg.

He served as priest for young people for the diocese of Bamberg from 1965 to 1972. He was then priest at St. Gangolf from 1973 to 1983 and St. Martin from 1983 to 1987, and also dean of Bamberg from 1981 to 1987. He became Domkapitular in 1987 and deputy vicar general. In July 1990, Albrecht was ordained as vicar general of the diocese, leading the department of press relations. On completion of his 70th year on 31 March 2006 he requested to be retired, which was granted by Archbishop Ludwig Schick.

Albrecht died in Bamberg on 21 November 2022, at the age of 86, after a short illness.

== Hymnwriter ==
Albrecht was among the pioneers of the genre Neues Geistliches Lied. He wrote te first songs in 1970s, inspired by meeting the composer Peter Janssens and the priest and hymnwriter Josef Metternich Some of his songs were included in hymnals such as Gotteslob and Cantate.

== Werke ==
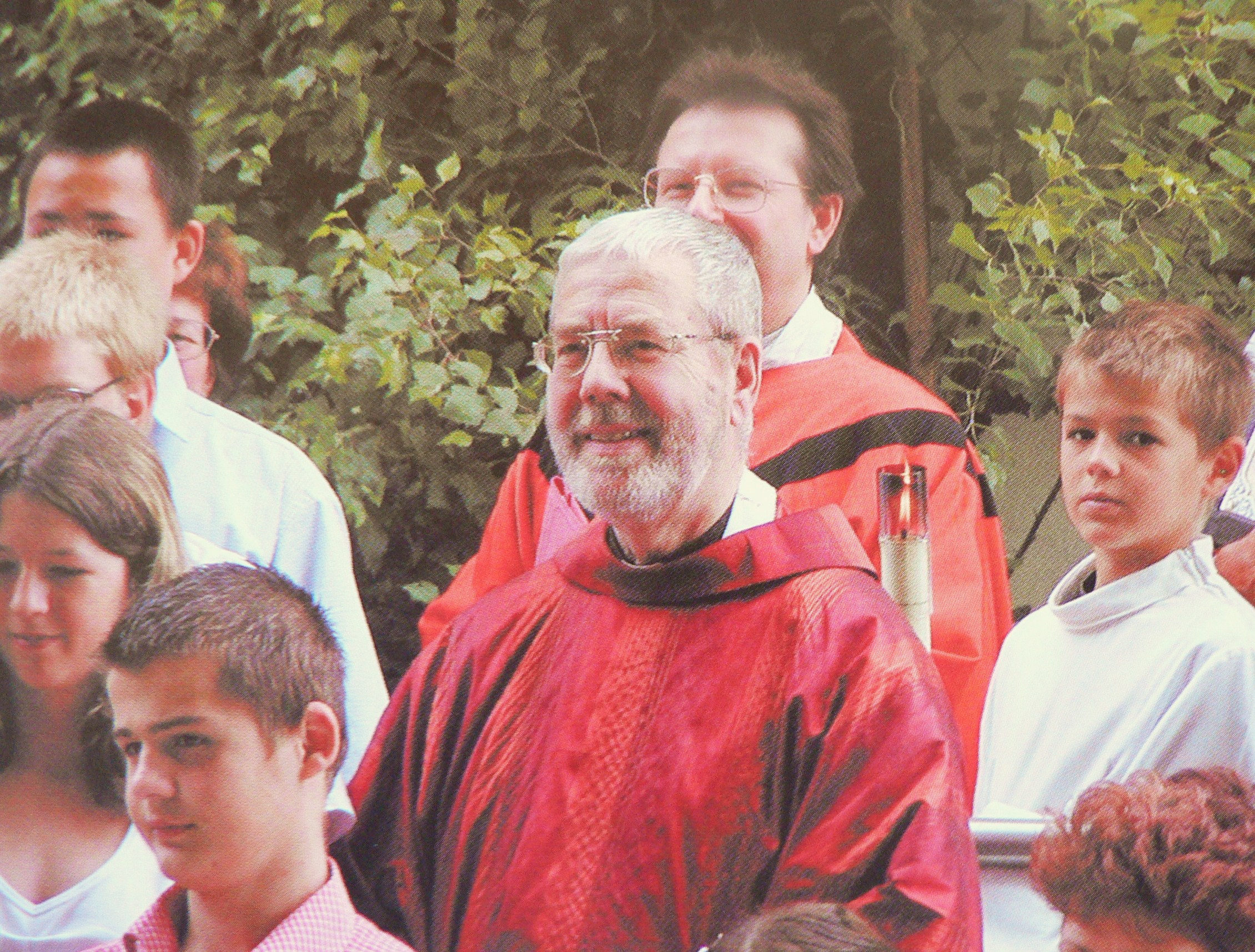
Albrecht at a confirmation in 2003

=== Writings ===
- Handbuch für Pfarrjugendleiter. Landesstelle für die kath. Jugend. Munich 1970.
- Gottesdienst für junge Menschen – Gottesdienst in neuer Gestalt. Steinkopf. Stuttgart 1972.
- Neu werden aus seinem Wort. Verlag Katholisches Bibelwerk. Stuttgart 1976.
- Nicht vom Brot allein. Gedanken zu den Sonntagen und Festen im Kirchenjahr. Bergmoser + Höller Verlag. Aachen 1978.
- Heinrich und Kunigunda. Deutungsversuche für unsere Zeit. St. Otto Verlag. Bamberg 1978.
- Wir ist mehr als ich plus du. Rba. Stuttgart 1984.
- Der heilige Otto, Bischof von Bamberg und Apostel der Pommern. St. Otto Verlag. Bamberg 1989.
- Glaube in Licht und Farbe. Worte – Wege – Träume im Bamberger Dom Heinrichsverlag. Bamberg 2008.
- Geistliche Lieder und Singspiele für die Jugend in der Kirche, vol. I: Unser Leben sei ein Fest, vol. II: Kleines Senfkorn Hoffnung. Bamberg 2011.
- Der Bamberger Dom – Ein Fest des Glaubens. Bamberg 2011, ISBN 978-3-931432-25-6.
- Otto, der Heilige. Bamberg 2014, ISBN 978-3-00-047959-5.
- Herr, baue deine Kirche und fange bei mir an. Bamberg 2017, vol. 1: Erster Teil 1987 bis 2001, ISBN 978-3-00-056278-5, Bd. 2: Zweiter Teil 2002 bis 2006, ISBN 978-3-00-056279-2.
- Missionskreis Ayopaya Bolivien. Chronik eines 50-jährigen Engagements. Fruhauf, Bamberg 2018, ISBN 978-3-00-059066-5.
- Ich möchte sprechen können wie die Rose : Texte aus den letzten Jahren (2015–2021). Archiv Druck und Verlag, Bamberg 2022, ISBN 978-3-00-071797-0.
- Kirche heute : Weck die tote Christenheit... Lesebuch für Gott- und Kirchensucher. Bamberg 2024, ISBN 978-3-00-077631-1.

==== Neues Geistliches Lied ====
- "Andere Lieder wollen wir singen", music: Peter Janssens.
- "Brot gegen den Tod", music: Janssens.
- "Dem Himmel entgegen – Ein Haus für Gott gebaut.", music: Florian Donabauer, for the Bamberg Cathedral jubilee 2012.
- "Du hast keine Hände, Herr, nimm die meinen", music: Peter Janssens, Ludger Stühlmeyer. In: Gotteslob 1975, GL 992.
- "Die Sache Jesu braucht Begeisterte", music: Janssens.
- "Eines Tages kam einer", music: Janssens. In: Gotteslob 1975, GL 972, and Gotteslob 2013, GL 805.
- "Freut euch und tanzt", music: Janssens.
- "Jetzt ist die Zeit", music: Ludger Edelkötter. In: Gotteslob 1975, GL 993, and Gotteslob 2013, GL 862.
- "Kleines Senfkorn Hoffnung", music: Edelkötter. Gotteslob 1975, GL 931, and Gotteslob 2013, GL 856.
- "Manchmal feiern wir mitten im Tag", music: Janssens. Gotteslob 2013, GL 472.
- "Unser Leben sei ein Fest", music: Janssens. Gotteslob 1975, GL 929, and Gotteslob 1975, Austria, GL 859

== Awards ==
- 1991: Päpstlicher Ehrenprälat, by Popo Johannes Paul II.
- 1995: Verdienstorden der Bundesrepublik Deutschland
- 1997: Ehrendomherr der Erzdiözese Stettin-Cammin
- 2000: Apostolischer Protonotar, by Pope Johannes Paul II.
- 2006: Verdienstorden der Bundesrepublik Deutschland (first class)
