= Thomas Laubach =

German theologian and author

- Born: 1964 (age 60–61); Cologne, North Rhine-Westphalia, Germany
- Other names: Thomas Weißer
- Education: University of Bonn; University of Tübingen
- Occupations: Theologian; Hymnwriter
- Organizations: Südwestrundfunk; University of Bamberg

Thomas Laubach (after marriage Thomas Weißer) (born 1964) is a German Catholic theologian. He wrote the texts for numerous hymns of the genre Neues Geistliches Lied (NGL). He has used his birth name in publications. Under his family name Weißer, he worked in education and journalism, specifically as representative of the Catholic Church at the broadcaster SWR. He has been professor of ethics at the University of Bamberg from 2003.

== Career ==
Born in Cologne, Laubach attended the Johann-Gottfried-Herder-Gymnasium there, completing with the Abitur in 1983. He studied Catholic theology and German studies at the University of Bonn and the University of Tübingen, graduating in 1991. From 1985, he studied on a scholarship from the Albertus-Magnus-Verein of the Diocese of Cologne. Between 1992 and 2006, he worked as a research assistant at the Catholic faculty of the University of Tübingen, in the Department of Theological Ethics. He was promoted to Ph.D. in 1999, with a dissertation "Lebensführung. Annäherungen an einen ethischen Grundbegriff" (Approaches to a basic ethical concept). He was habilitated in 2003, with a work "Warum sollen wir erinnern? Möglichkeiten und Grenzen einer anamnetischen Ethik" (Why should we remember? Possibilities and limits of anamnetic ethics).

Parallel to his academic career, Laubach has worked as a pedagogical assistant and lecturer in youth and adult education from 1984, and since 1987, also in the field of journalism. From 2006 to 2012, he was a broadcasting representative of the Catholic Church at Südwestrundfunk (SWR) in Mainz, where he was responsible for the radio and television programm of the Catholic Church.

Since 1 April 2012, Weißer has been Professor of Christian ethics at the University of Bamberg.

He is a lyricist for more than 250 Christian pop songs (NGL) such as "Da berühren sich Himmel und Erde", "Und meine Seele singt", "Du sei bei uns" and "Gott sei über dir". For many years he was a member of the nationally known band RUHAMA.

== Private life ==
Laubach married in 1993 and legally took his wife's surname, Weißer, but uses his birth name for publications. The couple have four children and live near Mainz.

== Work ==
- Das kleine Buch zum Leben. Gedanken zur Auferstehung, with pictures by Paul Cézanne, tvd-Verlag, Düsseldorf 2009, ISBN 978-3-9265-1286-4.
- Mit Gott und der Welt reden: Warum beten (nicht nur) Kindern guttut. Schwabenverlag, Ostfildern 2010, ISBN 978-3-7966-1517-7.
- Von hier bis Betlehem. Fünf Krippenspiele mit Musik (with CD). tvd-Verlag, Düsseldorf 2013, ISBN 978-3-9265-1298-7.
- with Jochen Sautermeister: Gender – Herausforderung für die christliche Ethik. Freiburg im Breisgau: Herder, 2017, ISBN 978-3-4513-7898-0.
- Das kleine Buch vom Stern, with pictures by Wassily Kandinsky. tvd-Verlag, Düsseldorf 2019, ISBN 978-3-9456-0329-1.
