= Carnival =

Christian festival before Lent

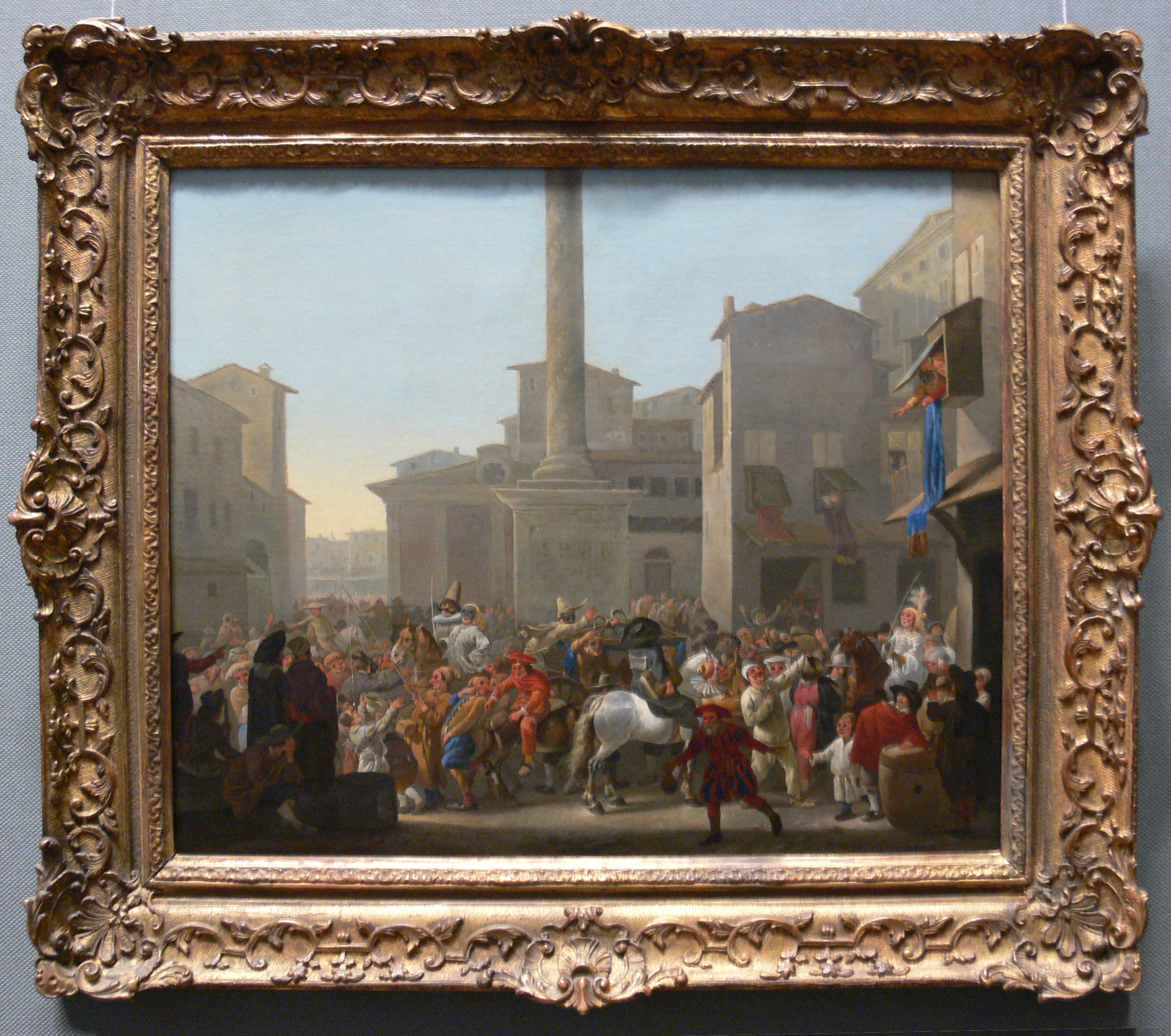
Carnival in Rome, c. 1650

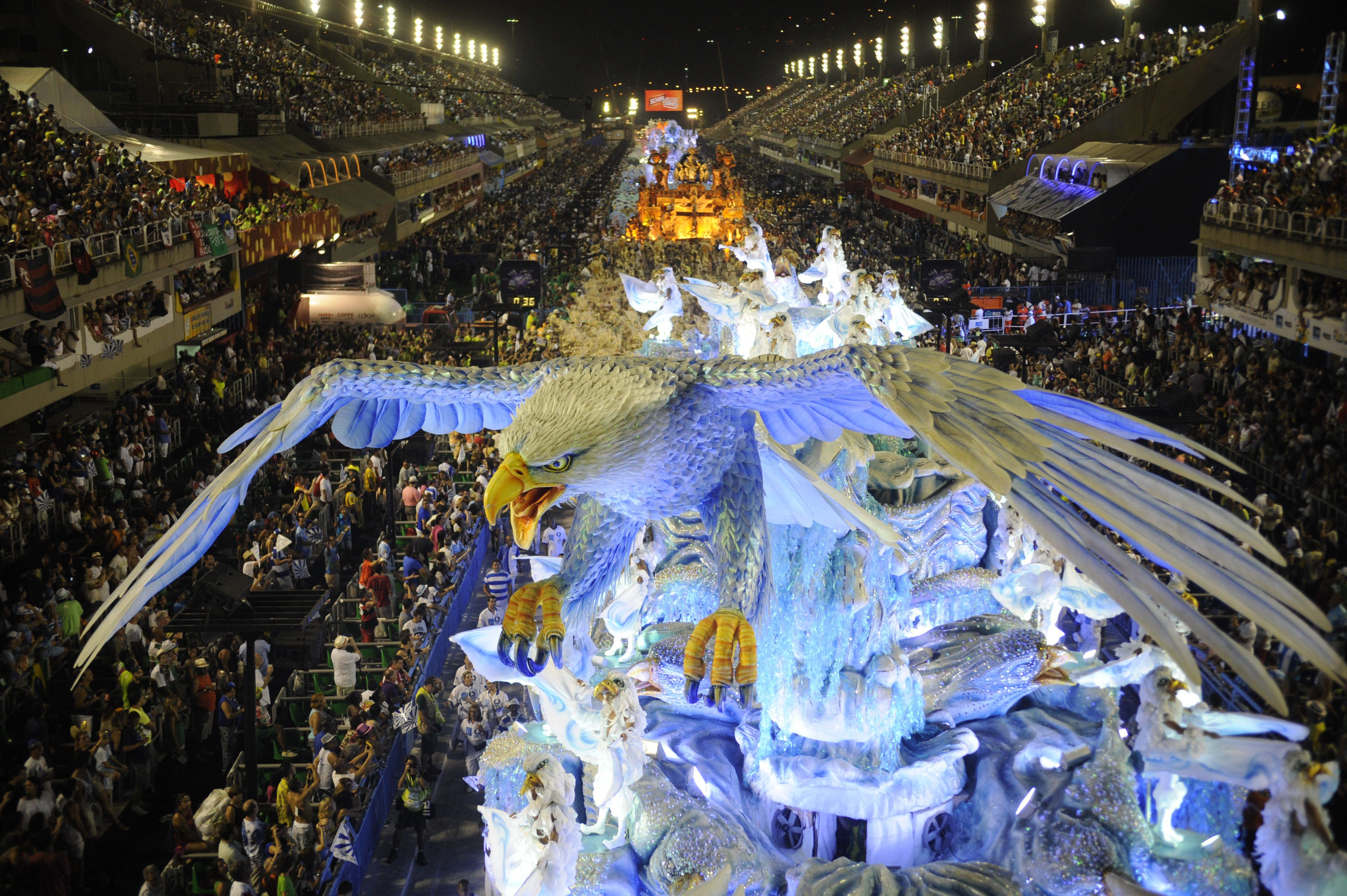
Rio's Carnival is the largest in the world according to Guinness World Records.

Carnival (known as Shrovetide in certain localities) is a festive season at the close of the Christian pre-Lenten period, consisting of Quinquagesima or Shrove Sunday, Shrove Monday, and Shrove Tuesday or Mardi Gras.

Carnival typically involves public celebrations, including events such as parades, public street parties and other entertainments, combining some elements of a circus. Elaborate costumes and masks allow people to set aside their everyday individuality and experience a heightened sense of social unity. Participants often indulge in excessive consumption of alcohol, meat, and other foods that will be forgone during upcoming Lent. Traditionally, butter, milk, and other animal products were not consumed "excessively", rather, their stock was fully consumed during Shrovetide as to reduce waste. This festival is known for being a time of great indulgence before Lent (which is a time stressing the opposite), with drinking, overeating, and various other activities of indulgence being performed. For example, pancakes, donuts, and other desserts are prepared and eaten for a final time. During Lent, dairy and animal products are eaten less, if at all, and individuals make a Lenten sacrifice, thus giving up a certain object of desire (e.g. sweets), with the money that would go to purchase what was sacrificed being donated at the church as alms for the poor.

As such, during the season of Shrovetide, it is customary for Christians to ponder what Lenten sacrifices they will make for the coming Lent. The traditions of carrying Shrovetide rods and consuming Shrovetide buns after attending church are celebrated. On the final day of the season, Shrove Tuesday, many traditional Christians, such as Lutherans, Anglicans, and Roman Catholics, "make a special point of self-examination, of considering what wrongs they need to repent, and what amendments of life or areas of spiritual growth they especially need to ask God's help in dealing with." During Shrovetide, many churches place a basket in the narthex to collect the previous year's Holy Week palm branches that were blessed and distributed during the Palm Sunday liturgies. On Shrove Tuesday (the final day of Shrovetide), churches burn these palms to make the ashes used during the services held on the very next day, Ash Wednesday.

The term "Carnival" is traditionally used in areas with a large Catholic presence, as well as in Greece. The celebration is known as Fastelavn in historically Evangelical Lutheran countries. It is called Shrovetide in areas with a high concentration of Anglicans (Church of England/US Episcopal Church), Methodists, and other Protestants. In Slavic Eastern Orthodox nations, Maslenitsa is celebrated during the last week before Great Lent. In German-speaking Europe and the Netherlands, the Carnival season traditionally opens on 11/11 (often at 11:11 a.m.). This dates back to celebrations before the Advent season or with harvest celebrations of St. Martin's Day.

== Etymology ==
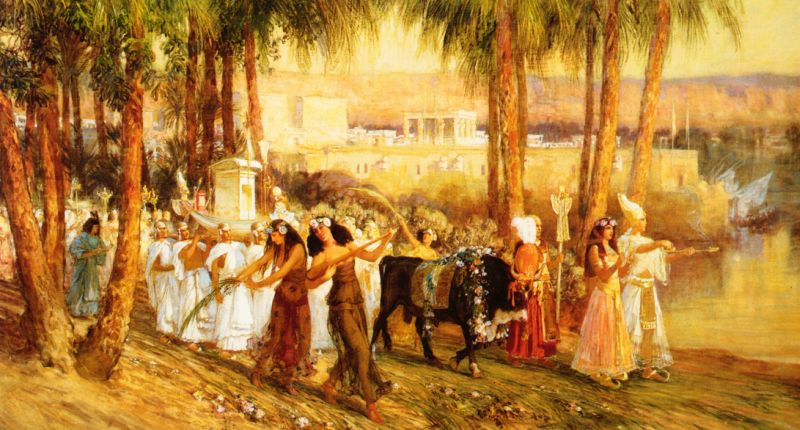
Feast of the Navigium Isidis, celebrated in Ancient Rome in honor of the goddess Isis

The word carnival is said to come from the Late Latin expression carne levare, which means "remove meat"; a folk etymology derives it from carne vale, "farewell to meat". In either case, this signifies the approaching fast of Lent. The word carne may also be translated as flesh, producing "a farewell to the flesh", a phrase embraced by certain Carnival celebrants to embolden the festival's carefree spirit.

Other scholars argue that the origin of the word is a common meat-based country feast (in Latin carnualia) or the festival of the Navigium Isidis ("ship of Isis"), where the image of Isis was carried to the seashore to bless the start of sailing season. The festival consisted of a parade of masks following an adorned wooden boat, called in Latin carrus navalis, possibly the source of both the name and the parade floats.

== History ==
=== Origins ===
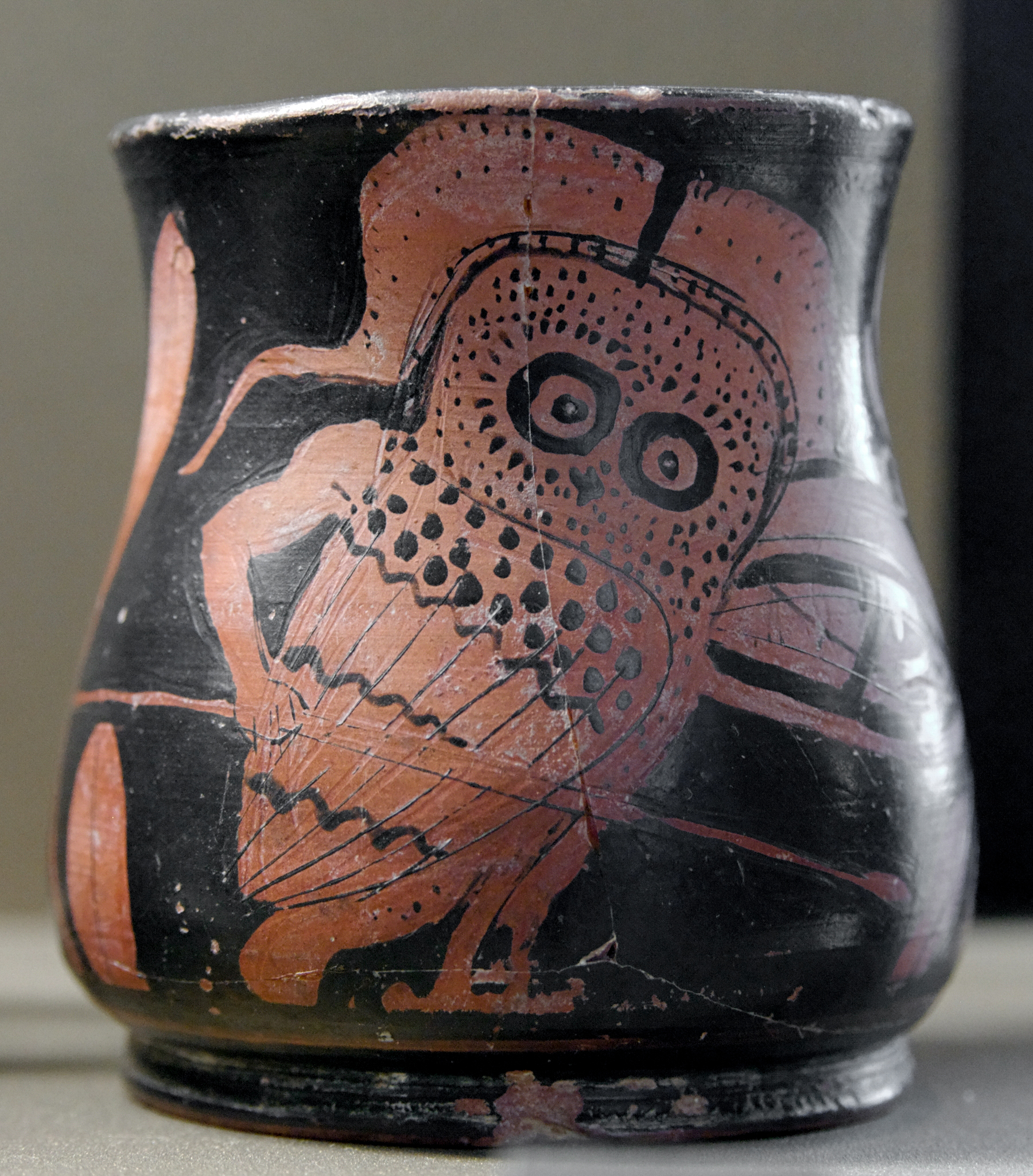
Oinochoe depicting the parade of an armed owl during the celebration of the Anthesteria (Greece, 410–390 BC)

The characteristics of the celebration of Carnival take their origins from ancient European festivals, such as the Greek Dionysian (the Anthesteria) or the Roman Saturnalia. During these festivities, there was a temporary release from social obligations and hierarchies to make way for the overthrow of order, joking and debauchery. From a historical and religious point of view, the Carnival therefore represented a period of celebration, but above all of symbolic renewal, during which chaos replaced the established order, which, however, once the festive period was over, re-emerged new or renewed and guaranteed for a cycle valid until the beginning of the following Carnival.

From an anthropological point of view, Carnival is a reversal ritual, in which social roles are reversed and norms about desired behavior are suspended. During antiquity, winter was thought of as the reign of the winter spirits; these needed to be driven out in order for summer to return. Carnival can thus be regarded as a rite of passage from darkness to light, from winter to summer: a fertility celebration, the first spring festival of the new year.

Several Germanic tribes celebrated the return of the daylight. Winter would be driven out, to make sure that fertility could return in spring. A central figure of this ritual was possibly the fertility goddess Nerthus. There are some indications that the effigy of Nerthus or Freyr was placed on a ship with wheels and accompanied by a procession of people in animal disguise and men in women's clothes. Aboard the ship a marriage would be consummated as a fertility ritual.

Tacitus wrote in his Germania: Ceterum nec cohibere parietibus deos neque in ullam humani oris speciem adsimulare ex magnitudine caelestium arbitrator – "The Germans, however, do not consider it consistent with the grandeur of celestial beings to confine the gods within walls, or to liken them to the form of any human countenance." Germania 40: mox vehiculum et vestis et, si credere velis, numen ipsum secreto lacu abluitur – "Afterwards the car, the vestments, and, if you like to believe it, the divinity herself, are purified in a secret lake."

=== Middle Ages ===
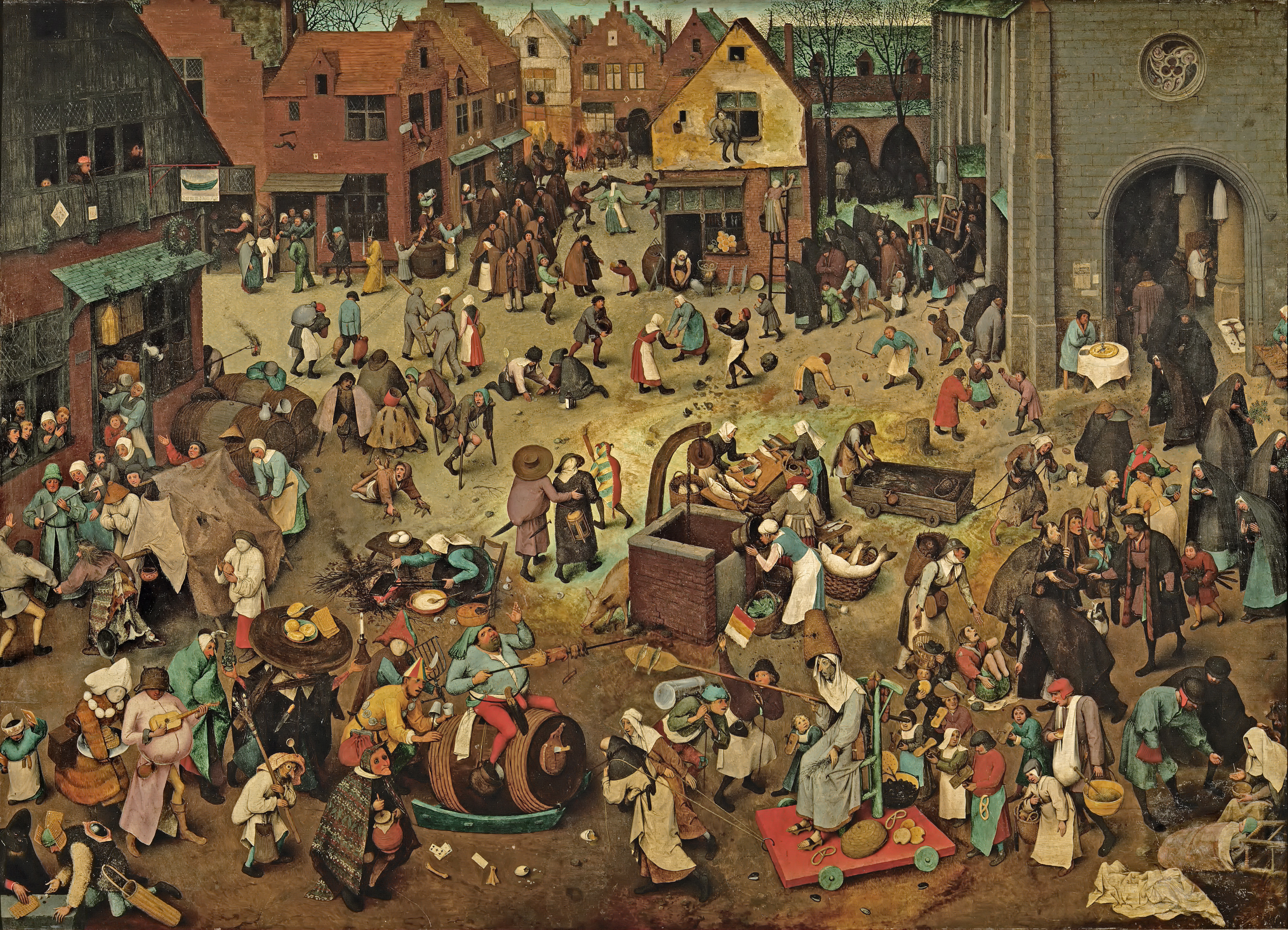
The Fight Between Carnival and Lent, Pieter Bruegel the Elder, 1559

In the Middle Ages, Carnival referred to a period following Epiphany season that reached its climax before midnight on Shrove Tuesday. British historian John Bossy, in writing on the origin of the practices during Carnival, states that "These were, despite some appearances, Christian in character, and they were medieval in origin: although it has been widely supposed that they continued some kind of pre-Christian cult, there is in fact no evidence that they existed much before 1200." Because Lent was a period of fasting, "Carnival therefore represented a last period of feasting and celebration before the spiritual rigors of Lent." Meat was plentiful during this part of the Christian calendar and it was consumed during Carnival as people abstained from meat consumption during the following liturgical season, Lent. This strong opposition between Lent and Carnival was reflected in medieval literary culture, notably in the 13th century French poem La bataille de Caresme et de Charnage (The Fight Between Carnival and Lent), which stages an allegorical conflict between festive excess and lenten austerity.

During Carnival, also known as Shrovetide, people confessed (shrived) their sins in preparation for Lent as well. Shakespeare's 1601 play The Merchant of Venice mentions Christians who painted their faces to celebrate the season:

What, are there masques? Hear you me, Jessica:
Lock up my doors, and when you hear the drum
And the vile squealing of the wry-neck'd fife,
Clamber not you up to the casements then,
Nor thrust your head into the public street
To gaze on Christian fools with varnish'd faces.

Traditionally, a Carnival feast was the last opportunity for common people to eat well, as there was typically a food shortage at the end of the winter as stores ran out. Until spring produce was available, people were limited to the minimum necessary meals during this period. On what nowadays is called vastenavond (the days before fasting), all the remaining winter stores of lard, butter, and meat which were left would be eaten, for these would otherwise soon start to rot and decay. The selected livestock had already been slaughtered in November and the meat would no longer be preservable. All the food that had survived the winter had to be eaten to assure that everyone was fed enough to survive until the coming spring would provide new food sources.

Traditionally, the feast also was a time to indulge in sexual desires, which were supposed to be suppressed during the following period fasting. Before Lent began, all rich food and drink were consumed in what became a giant celebration that involved the whole community, and is thought to be the origin of Carnival.

In many Christian sermons and texts, the example of a vessel is used to explain Christian doctrine: "the nave of the church of baptism", "the ship of Mary", etc. The writings show that processions with ship-like carts were held and lavish feasts were celebrated on the eve of Lent or the greeting of spring in the early Middle Ages.

The Lenten period of the liturgical calendar, the six weeks directly before Easter, was historically marked by fasting, study, and other pious or penitential practices. During Lent, no parties or celebrations were held, and people refrained from eating rich foods, such as meat, dairy, fat, and sugar. The first three classes were often totally unavailable during this period because of late winter shortages.

While Christian festivals such as Corpus Christi were Church-sanctioned celebrations, Carnival was also a manifestation of European folk culture. In the Christian tradition, fasting is to commemorate the 40 days that Jesus fasted in the desert, according to the New Testament, and also to reflect on Christian values. It was a time for catechumens (those converting to Christianity) to prepare for baptism at Easter.

Carnival in the Middle Ages took almost the entire period between Christmas and the beginning of Lent. In those two months, Christian populations used their several holidays as an outlet for their daily frustrations.

Many synods and councils attempted to set things "right". Caesarius of Arles (470–542) protested around 500 CE in his sermons against the pagan practices. Centuries later, his statements were adapted as the building blocks of the Indiculus superstitionum et paganiarum ("small index of superstitious and pagan practices"), which was drafted by the Synod of Leptines in 742. It condemned the Spurcalibus en februario.

Pope Gregory the Great (590–604) decided that fasting would start on Ash Wednesday. The whole Carnival event was set before the fasting, to set a clear division between celebrations and penitence. He also dispatched missionaries to sanctify any excesses in popular Carnival customs. It was also the custom during Carnival that the ruling class would be playfully mocked using masks and disguises.

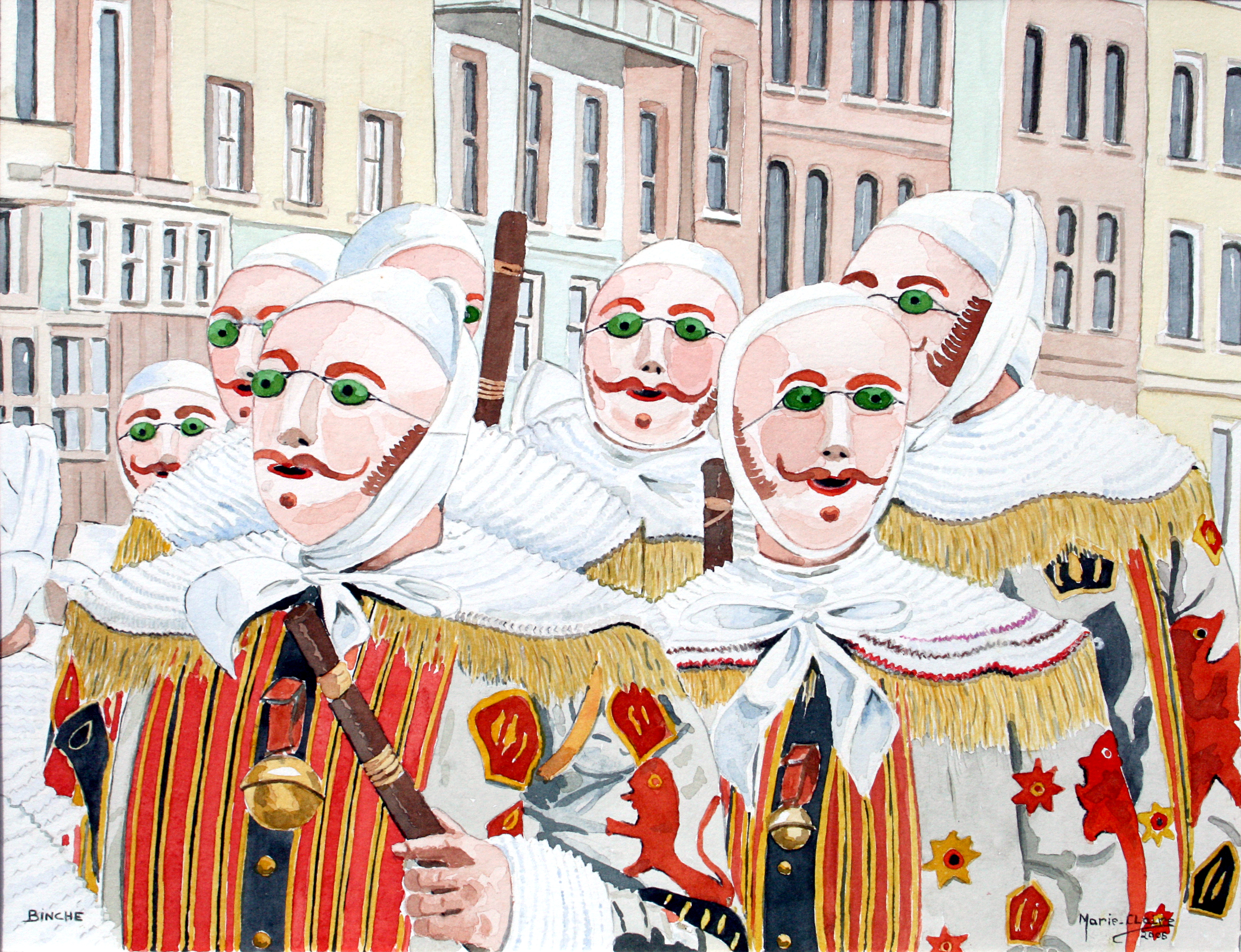
Gilles of Binche (Belgium)

In the year 743, the synod in Leptines (located near Binche in Belgium) spoke out furiously against the excesses in the month of February. Also from the same period dates the phrase: "Whoever in February by a variety of less honorable acts tries to drive out winter is not a Christian, but a pagan." Confession books from around 800 contain more information about how people would dress as an animal or old woman during the festivities in January and February, even though this was a sin with no small penance. Also in Spain in the seventh century, San Isidoro de Sevilla complained in his writings about people coming out into the streets disguised, in many cases, as the opposite sex.

=== Development ===
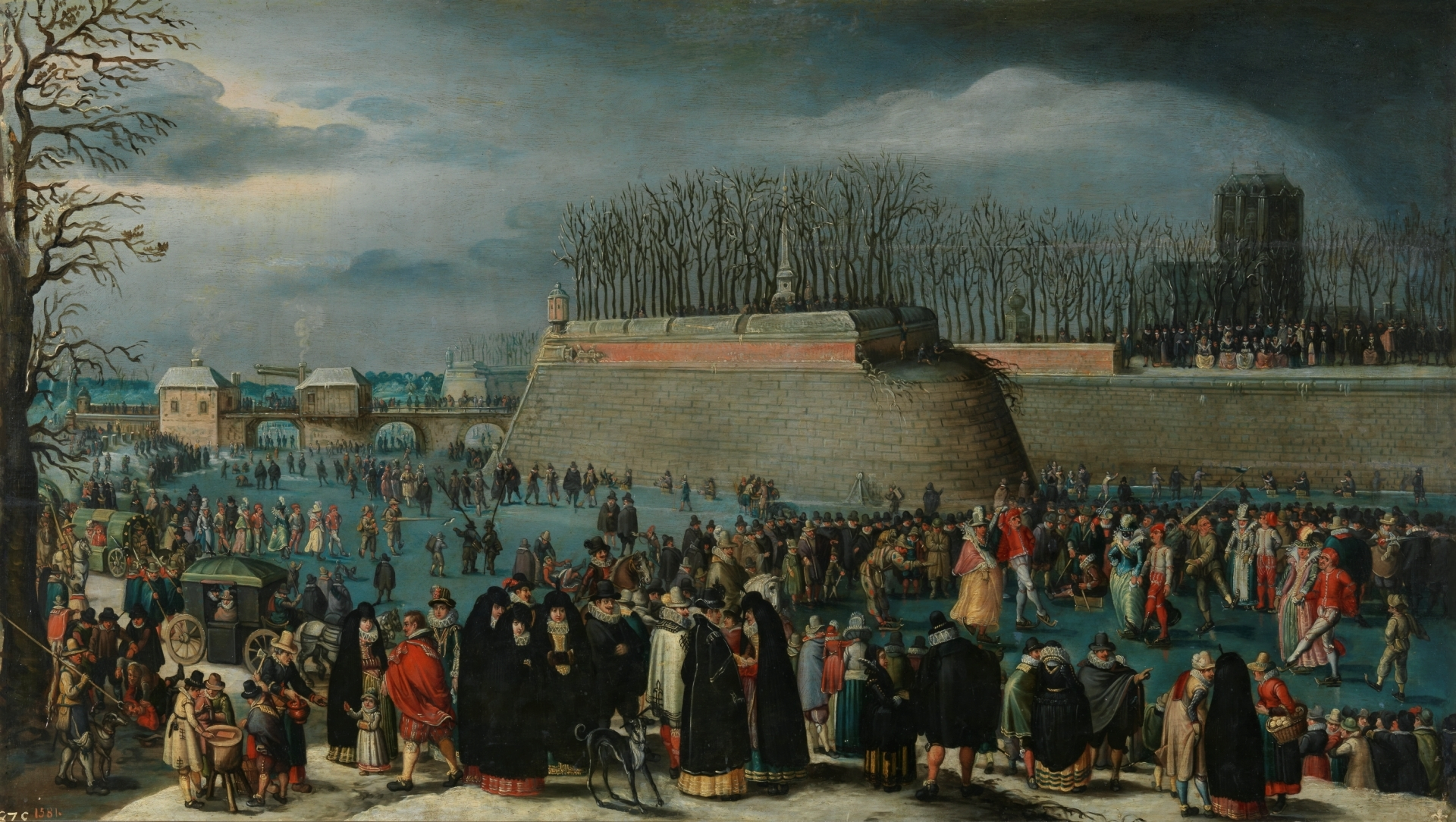
Carnival on Ice at the Kipdorppoort Moats in Antwerp, c. 1620

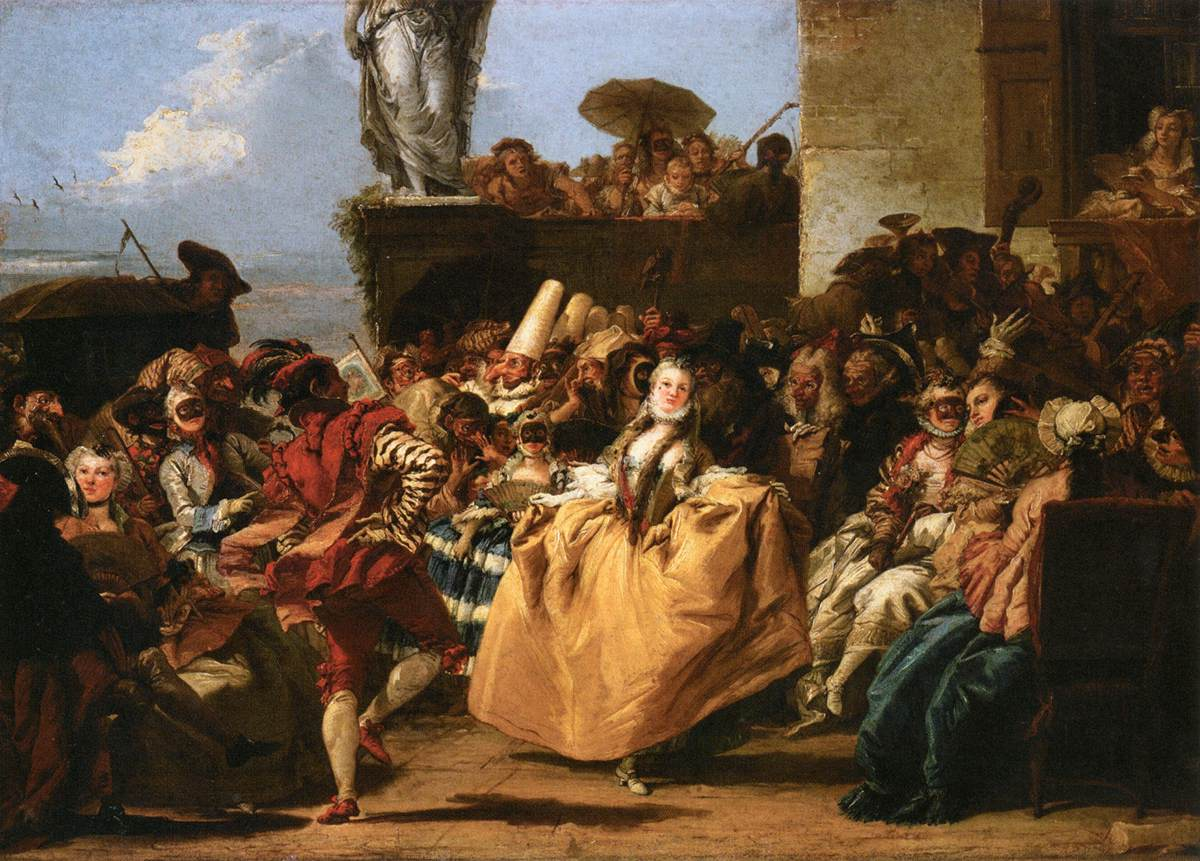
Carnival in Venice, by Giovanni Domenico Tiepolo, 1750

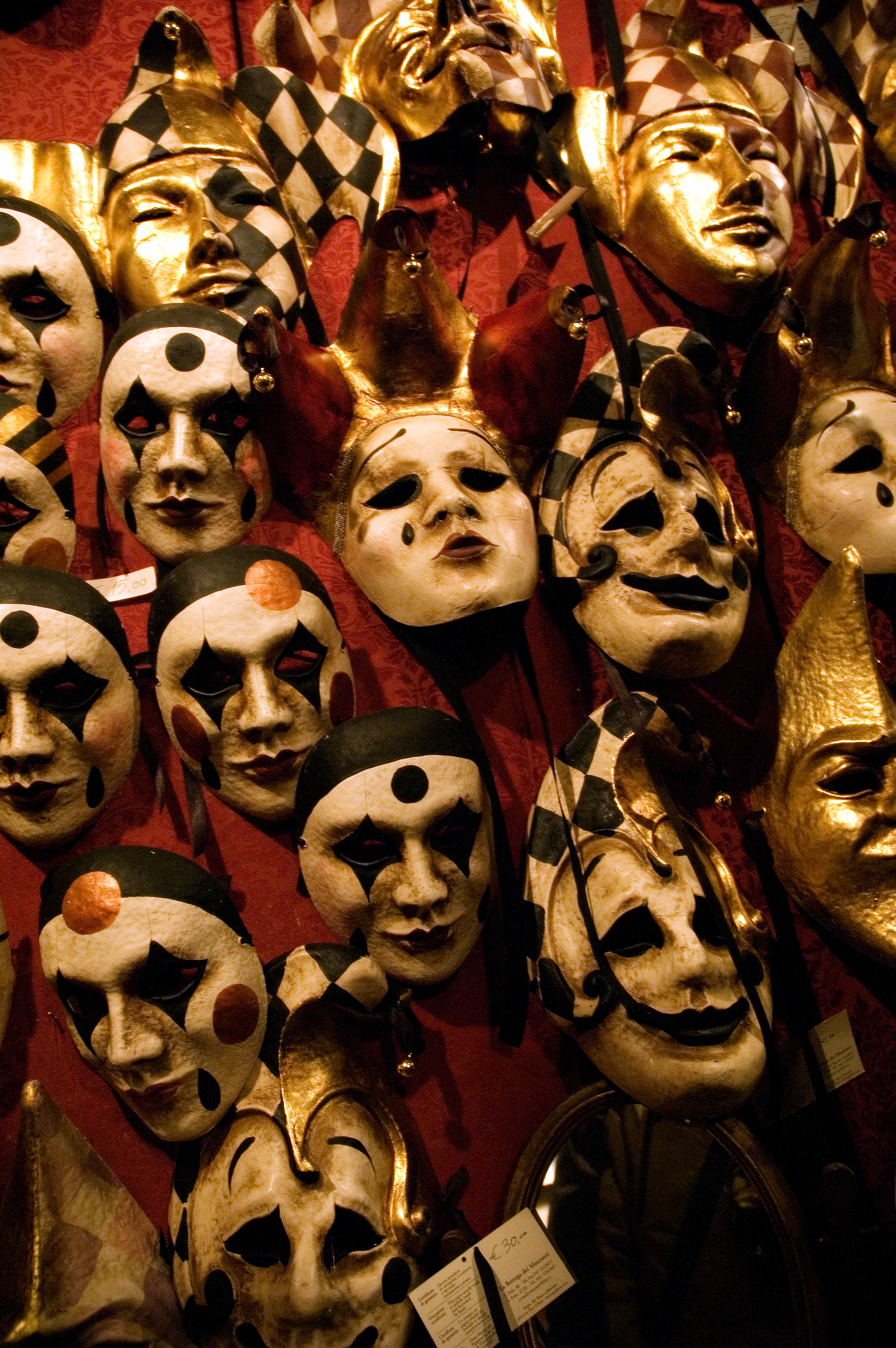
Typical masks worn at the Venice Carnival, which portray the satirical and exaggerated appearances often used

Gradually, ecclesiastical authority began to realize that the desired result could not be achieved by banning Carnivals, which eventually led to a degree of Christianization of the traditions. They then became part of the liturgy and the liturgical year. In the Middle Ages, "Carnival and Lent were both necessary, inevitable episodes in the eternal cycle of the Church year." While forming an integral part of the Christian calendar, particularly in Catholic regions, many Carnival traditions resemble those predating Christianity.

While medieval pageants and festivals such as Corpus Christi were church-sanctioned, Carnival was also a manifestation of medieval folk culture. Many local Carnival customs are claimed to derive from local pre-Christian rituals, such as elaborate rites involving masked figures in the Swabian-Alemannic Fastnacht. However, evidence is insufficient to establish a direct origin from Saturnalia or other ancient festivals. No complete accounts of Saturnalia survive, and the shared features of feasting, role reversals, temporary social equality, masks, and permitted rule-breaking do not necessarily constitute a coherent festival or link these festivals. These similarities may represent a reservoir of cultural resources that can embody multiple meanings and functions. For example, Easter begins with the resurrection of Jesus, followed by a liminal period, and ends with rebirth. Carnival reverses this as King Carnival comes to life, and a liminal period follows before his death. Both feasts are calculated by the lunar calendar. Both Jesus and King Carnival may be seen as expiatory figures who make a gift to the people with their deaths. In the case of Jesus, the gift is eternal life in heaven, and in the case of King Carnival, the acknowledgement that death is a necessary part of the cycle of life.

Holy Week processions in Spain include crowds who vociferously insult the figure of Jesus. Irreverence, parody, degradation, and laughter at a tragicomic effigy of God can be seen as intensifications of the sacred order. In 1466, in festivities sponsored by Pope Paul II, Jews were forced to race naked through the streets of the city of Rome. Clement IX stopped these practices and in their place assessed a heavy tax on the Jews to help pay for the costs of the city's Carnival celebrations.

Some of the best-known traditions, including carnal parades and masquerade balls, were first recorded in medieval Italy. The Carnival of Venice was, for a long time, the most famous Carnival (although Napoleon abolished it in 1797 and only in 1979 was the tradition restored). From Italy, Carnival traditions spread to Spain, Portugal, and France, and from France to New France in North America. From Spain and Portugal, it spread with colonization to the Caribbean and Latin America. In the early 19th century in the German Rhineland and Southern Netherlands, the weakened medieval tradition also revived. Continuously in the 18th and 19th centuries CE, as part of the annual abuse of the Carnival in Rome, rabbis of the ghetto were forced to march through the city streets wearing foolish guise, jeered upon and pelted by a variety of missiles from the crowd. A petition of the Jewish community of Rome sent in 1836 to Pope Gregory XVI to stop the annual abuse was denied: "It is not opportune to make any innovation."

In the Rhineland in 1823, the first modern Carnival parade took place in Cologne. Carnaval (Karneval, Fasching or Fastnacht in Germany) mixed pagan traditions with Christian traditions. Pre-Lenten celebrations featured parades, costumes and masks to endure Lent's withdrawal from worldly pleasures.

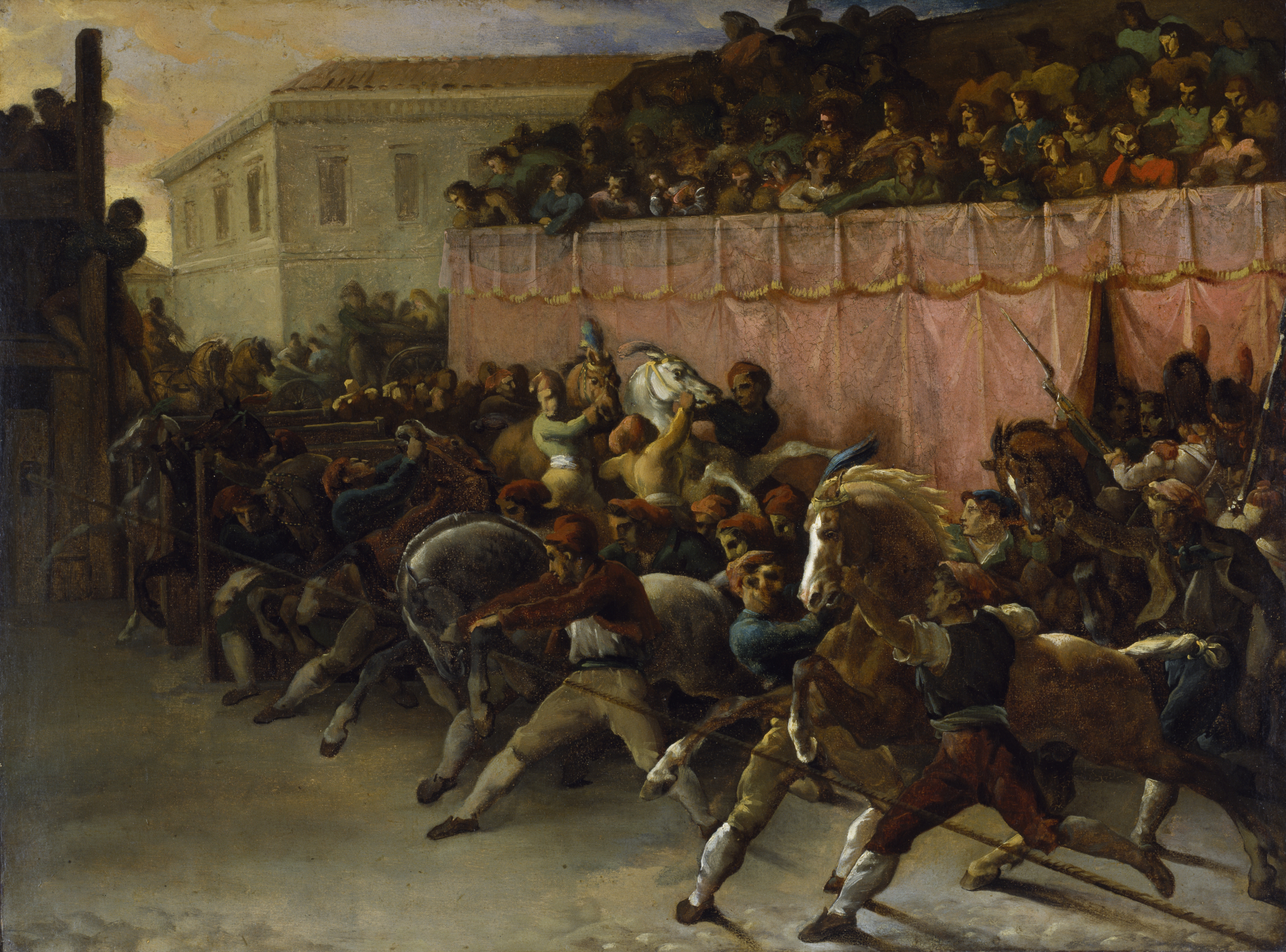
Riderless Racers at Rome by Théodore Géricault. From the mid-15th century until 1882, spring carnival in Rome closed with a horse race. Fifteen to 20 riderless horses, originally imported from the Barbary Coast of North Africa, ran the length of the Via del Corso, a long, straight city street, in about 2 1/2 minutes.

Other areas developed their own traditions. In the United Kingdom, West Indian immigrants brought with them the traditions of Caribbean Carnival; however, the Carnivals now celebrated at Notting Hill, Leeds, Yorkshire, and other places became divorced from their religious origin and became secular events that take place in the summer months.

== Theories ==
Interpretations of Carnival present it as a social institution that degrades or "uncrowns" the higher functions of thought, speech, and the soul by translating them into the grotesque body, which serves to renew society and the world, as a release for impulses that threaten the social order that ultimately reinforces social norms, as a social transformation, or as a tool for different groups to focus attention on conflicts and incongruities by embodying them in "senseless" acts.

Furthermore, some cultures use Carnival as a method of empowering themselves in spite of social conflicts. For example, when the Caribbean Carnival was established as a result of French settlers, even the slaves had their version of the masquerade, where they would reverse roles to mock those of higher social status. Along with empowering individuals for a period of time, despite their typical status, Carnival brings communities together. In a day where all are meant to perform a "mask" that differs from their typical identity, all members of a society are able to connect through their theatricality and satire.

Mircea Eliade, historian of religions, writes: "Any new year is a revival of time at its beginning, a repetition of the cosmogony. Ritual fights between two groups of extras, the presence of the dead, Saturnalia and orgies, are all elements which indicate that at the end of the year and in the expectation of the new year the mythical moments of the passage of chaos to the cosmogony are repeated". Eliade also writes: "Then the dead will come back, because all barriers between the dead and the living are broken (is the primordial chaos not revived?), and will come back since – at this paradoxical moment – time will be interrupted, so that the dead may be again contemporaries of the living." Eliade speculates that people have "a deep need to regenerate themselves periodically by abolishing the elapsed time and making topical the cosmogony".

== Geographic distribution ==
=== Africa ===
For the Canary Islands, see its section under Europe.

==== Cape Verde Islands ====
Carnival was introduced by Portuguese settlers. It is celebrated on each of the archipelago's nine inhabited islands. In Mindelo, São Vicente, groups challenge each other for a yearly prize. It has imported various Brazilian Carnival traditions. The celebration in São Nicolau is more traditional, where established groups parade through the Ribeira Brava, gathering in the town square, although it has adopted drums, floats and costumes from Brazil. In São Nicolau, three groups, Copa Cabana, Estrela Azul, and Brilho Da Zona, construct a painted float using fire, newspaper for the mold, and iron and steel for structure. Carnival São Nicolau is celebrated over three days: dawn Saturday, Sunday afternoon, and Tuesday. The celebrations are captured in the award-winning feature documentary Tchindas, nominated at the 12th Africa Movie Academy Awards.

==== Namibia ====
Carnival was introduced by German settlers. The celebration is based on the "Rheinische" Carnival tradition.

==== Seychelles ====
The Seychelles carnival began in 2011. It is held in the capital city of Victoria and takes place over three days. On Day 1, the grand opening is held in the city center near the clock tower. The second day is parade day. On Day 3, the closing ceremony is held, and a lottery winner is announced.

==== Zimbabwe ====
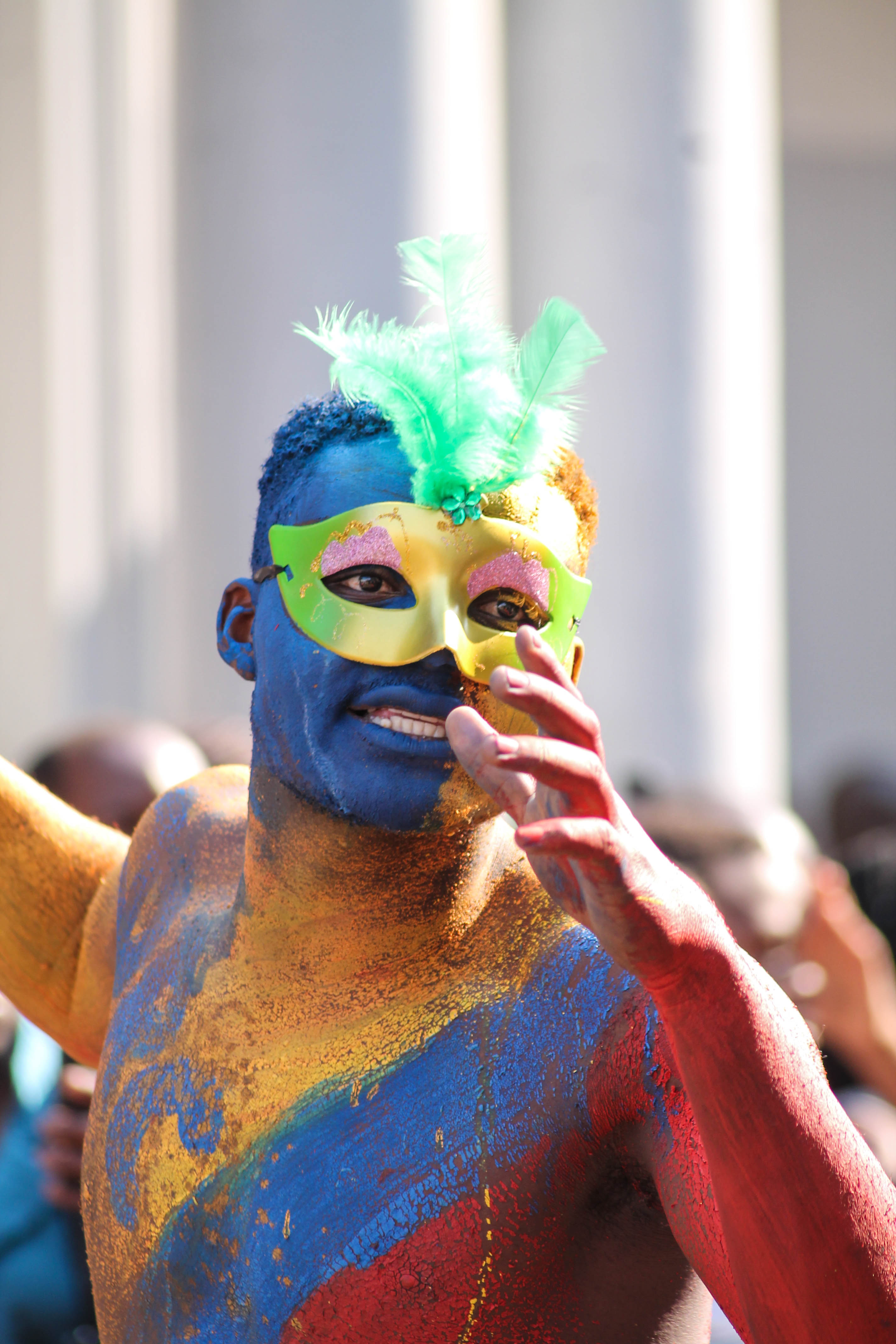
Harare Carnival dancer

The Harare Carnival is held late in May. Events include fashion and music shows. The climax is a street party featuring costumes and music.

=== Americas ===
==== Antigua ====
The Antiguan Carnival is held from the end of July to the first Tuesday in August. The most important day is that of the j'ouvert (or juvé), in which brass and steelpan bands perform. Barbuda's Carnival, held in June, is known as "Caribana". The Antiguan and Barbudan Carnivals replaced the Old Time Christmas Festival in 1957, with hopes of inspiring tourism.

==== Argentina ====
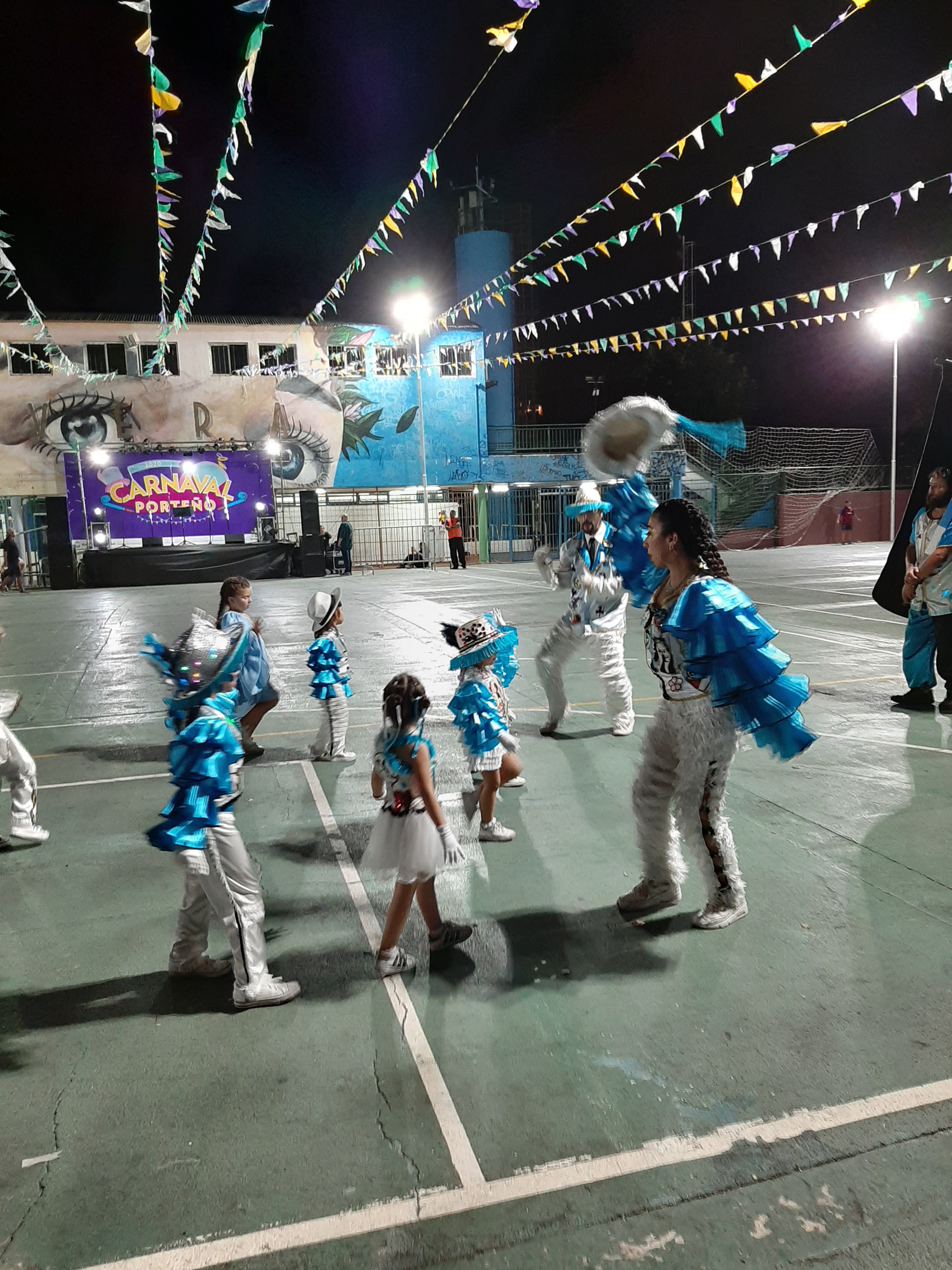
Carnival in Argentina by school children

In Argentina, the most representative Carnival performed is the so-called Murga, although other famous Carnivals, more like Brazil's, are held in Argentine Mesopotamia and the North-East. Gualeguaychú in the east of Entre Ríos Province is the most important Carnival city and has one of the largest parades. It adopts a musical background similar to Brazilian or Uruguayan Carnival. Corrientes is another city with a Carnival tradition. Chamamé is a popular musical style. In all major cities and many towns throughout the country, Carnival is celebrated.

The Humahuaca Carnival is a popular celebration, which takes place at the beginning of Lent (40 days before Holy Week), in the Quebrada de Humahuaca area, Jujuy province, Argentina.

As Carnival coincides with summer in the Southern Hemisphere, in many parts of Argentina children play with water. The 19th century tradition of filling empty egg shells with water has evolved into water games that include the throwing of water balloons.

==== Aruba ====
Carnival in Aruba means weeks of events that bring colourfully decorated floats, contagiously throbbing music, luxuriously costumed groups of celebrants of all ages, King and Queen elections, electrifying jump-ups and torchlight parades, the Jouvert morning: the Children's Parades, and finally the Grand Parade. Aruba's biggest celebration is a month-long affair consisting of festive "jump-ups" (street parades), spectacular parades, and creative contests. Music and flamboyant costumes play a central role, from the Queen elections to the Grand Parade. Street parades continue in various districts throughout the month, with brass band, steelpan and roadmarch tunes. On the evening before Lent, Carnival ends with the symbolic burning of King Momo.

==== Bahamas ====
Junkanoo is the principal street parade in the Bahamas, it has been practiced in the Bahamas before and after the 1834 emancipation of slavery in the British Empire.

The Bahamas announced the first Bahamas Junkanoo Carnival to commence in May 2015. Carnival in the Bahamas rivals various carnivals throughout the Caribbean in that it is a unique blend between the revered Junkanoo and traditional Carnival. This fairly new festival has been referred to as the ultimate celebration of everything Bahamian.

==== Barbados ====
"Crop Over" (formerly called "Harvest Home") is a traditional harvest festival celebrated in Barbados. Its early beginnings were on the sugar cane plantations during the colonial period. Crop Over began in 1688, and featured singing, dancing, and accompaniment by shak-shak, banjo, triangle, fiddle, guitar, bottles filled with water, and bones. Other traditions included climbing a greased pole, feasting, and drinking competitions. Originally signaling the end of the yearly cane harvest, it evolved into a national festival. In the late 20th century, Crop Over began to closely mirror the Trinidad Carnival. Beginning in June, Crop Over runs until the first Monday in August when it culminates in the finale, the Grand Kadooment.

Crop Over time for many islanders is a large party. Craft markets, food tents/stalls, street parties, and cavalcades fill every week.

A major feature is the calypso competition. Calypso music, originating in Trinidad, uses syncopated rhythm and topical lyrics. It offers a medium in which to satirise local politics, amidst the general bacchanal. Calypso tents, also originating in Trinidad, feature cadres of musicians who perform biting social commentaries, political exposés or rousing exhortations to "wuk dah waistline" and "roll dat bumper". The groups compete for the Calypso Monarch Award, while the air is redolent with the smells of Bajan cooking during the Bridgetown Market Street Fair. The Cohobblopot Festival blends dance, drama, and music with the crowning of the King and Queen of costume bands. Every evening the "Pic-o-de-Crop" Show is performed after the King of Calypso is finally crowned. The climax of the festival is Kadooment Day, celebrated with a national holiday, when costume bands fill the streets with pulsating Barbadian rhythms and fireworks.

==== Belize ====
San Pedro is one of Belize's few cities to observe Carnaval before Lent. Elsewhere, Carnaval (sometimes referred to as Carnival) often occurs in September. The Fiesta de Carnaval is often the most popular celebration, usually held over three days prior to Ash Wednesday, but the festivities often extend to the full week. This festival "always includes music, dancing, costumes and parades".

Comparsas are held throughout the week, consisting of large groups "of dancers dancing and traveling on the streets, followed by a Carrosa (carriage) where the musicians play. The Comparsa is a development of African processions where groups of devotees follow a given saint or deity during a particular religious celebration." One of the most popular comparsas of Fiesta de Carnaval is the male group comparsa, usually composed of notable men from the community who dress up in outlandish costumes or cross-dress and dance to compete for money and prizes. Other popular activities include body painting and flour fighting. "On the last day of Carnival painters flood the street to paint each other. This simply means that a mixture of water paint and water or raw eggs is used to paint people on the streets, the goal being to paint as many people as you can."

Street fights often occur during the festivities – some locals treat this festival as an opportunity to exact revenge on their enemies. Vandalism is common and "businesses constantly have to prepare in covering or repainting their advertisements during Carnival season because of the mischief performed." The tradition continues despite critics who advocate the termination of these festivities.

==== Bolivia ====
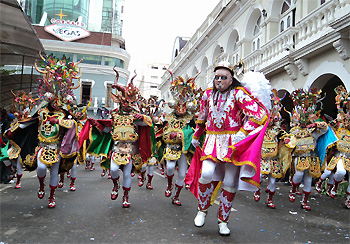
The Diablada, dance primeval, the typical and main dance of Carnaval de Oruro, a Masterpiece of the Oral and Intangible Heritage of Humanity since 2001 in Bolivia

La Diablada Carnival takes place in Oruro in central Bolivia. It is celebrated in honor of the miners' patron saint, Vírgen de Socavon (the Virgin of the Tunnels). Over 50 parade groups dance, sing, and play music over a five kilometre-long course. Participants dress up as demons, devils, angels, Incas, and Spanish conquistadors. Dances include caporales and tinkus. The parade runs from morning until late at night, 18 hours a day, for three days before Ash Wednesday. It was declared the 2001 "Masterpieces of Oral Heritage and Intangible Heritage of Humanity" by UNESCO. Throughout the country, celebrations are held involving traditional rhythms and water parties. In Santa Cruz de la Sierra, on the east side of the country, tropical weather allows a Brazilian-type Carnival, with Comparsas dancing traditional songs in matching uniforms.

==== Brazil ====
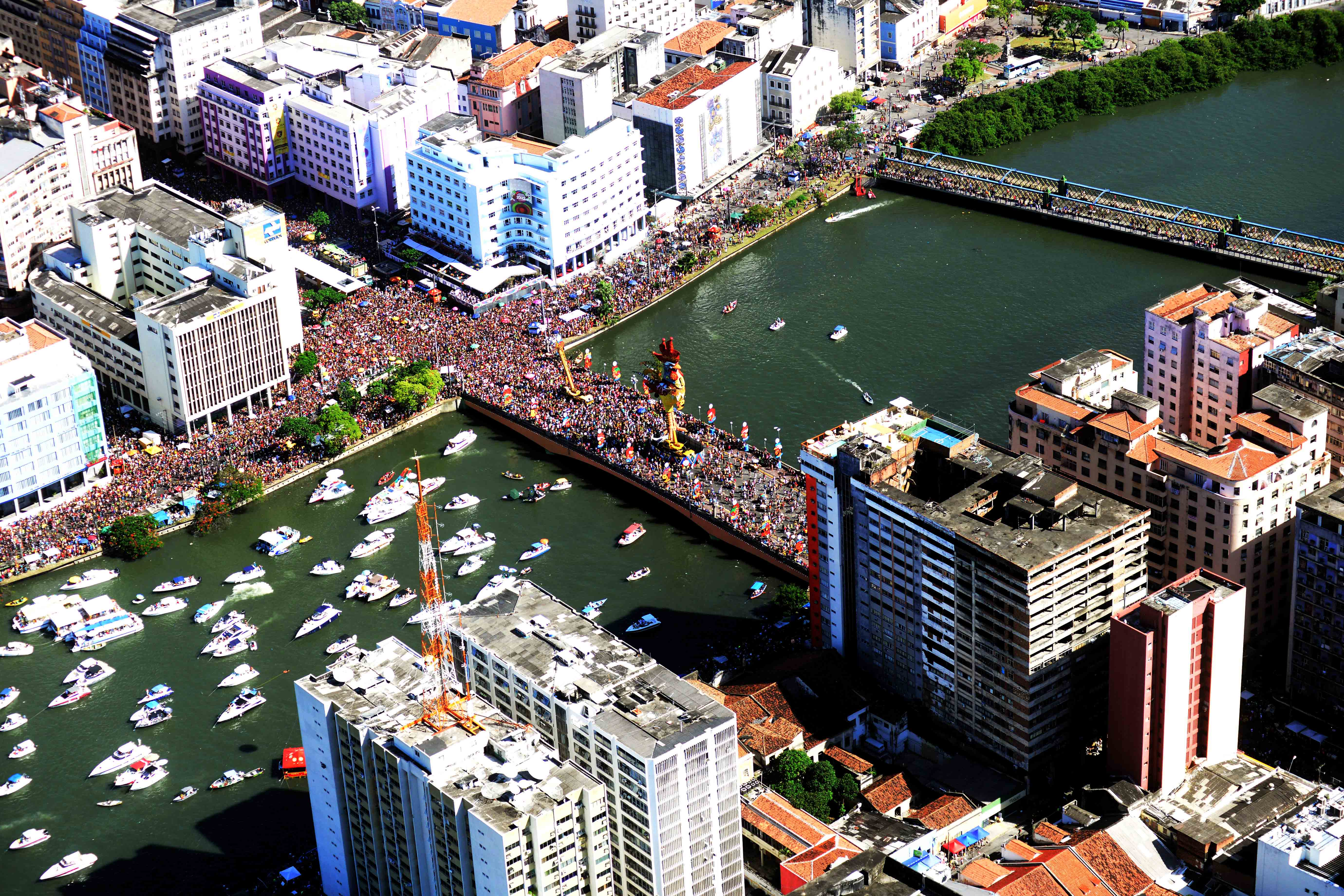
Recife Carnival, in Recife, Pernambuco, Brazil

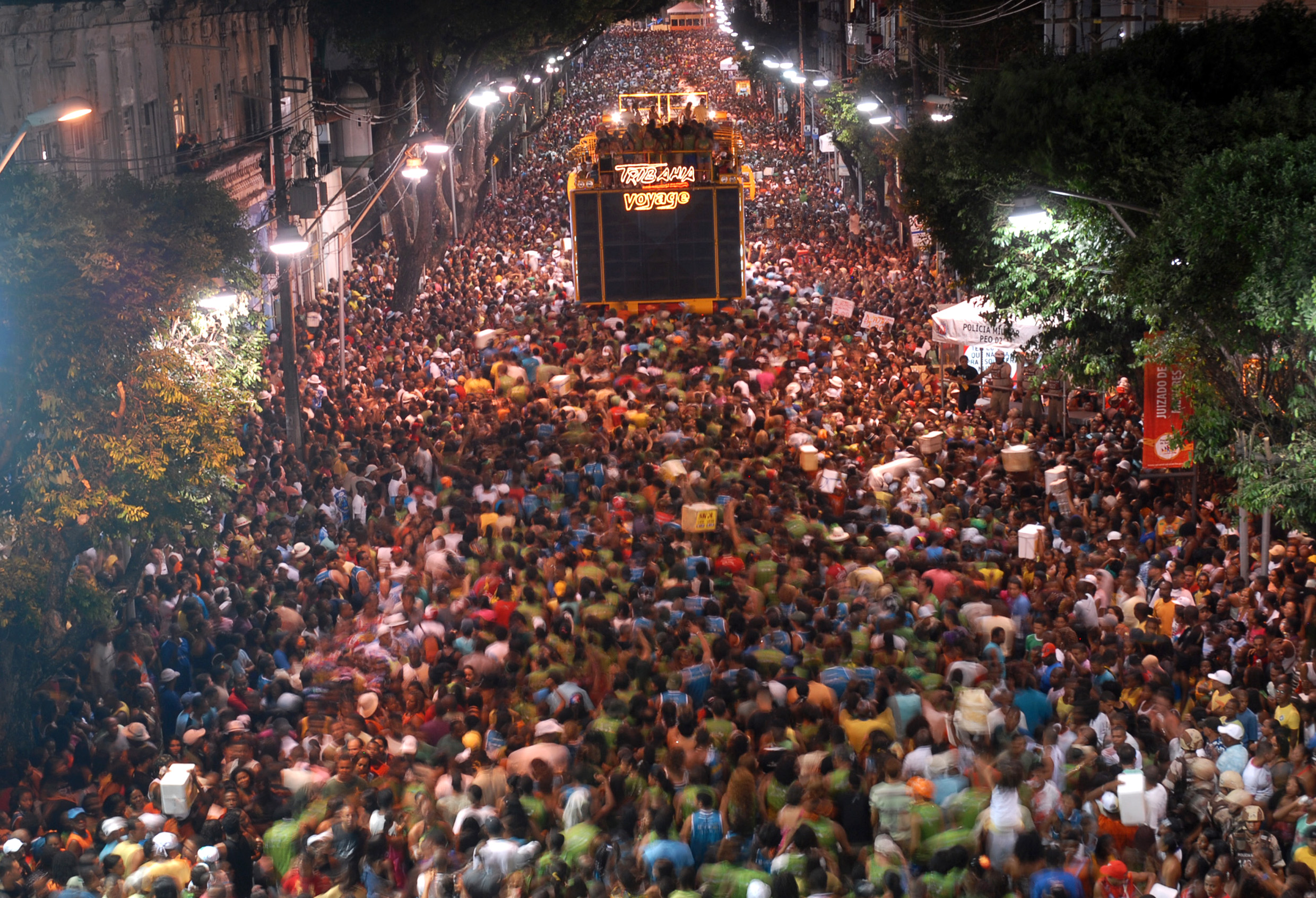
Carnival circuit of Salvador, Bahia, Brazil

The Carnival in Brazil (Portuguese: Carnaval) is a major part of Brazilian culture. The first expression of this festivity took place in Rio de Janeiro in 1641, with the préstitos, very similar to musical processions that were held on public streets when John IV of Portugal was crowned King.

===== Rio de Janeiro =====
The street carnival of Rio de Janeiro is designated by Guinness World Records as the largest carnival in the world, with approximately two million people each day.

Samba schools are large, social entities with thousands of members and a theme for their song and parade each year. In Rio Carnival, samba schools parade in the Sambadrome (sambódromo in Portuguese). Some of the most famous include GRES Estação Primeira de Mangueira, GRES Portela, GRES Acadêmicos do Salgueiro, GRES Imperatriz Leopoldinense, GRES Beija-Flor de Nilópolis, GRES Mocidade Independente de Padre Miguel, and recently, Unidos da Tijuca and GRES União da Ilha do Governador. Local tourists pay $500–950, depending on the costume, to buy a samba costume and dance in the parade. Blocos are small informal groups with a definite theme in their samba, usually satirizing the political situation. About 30 schools in Rio gather hundreds of thousands of participants. More than 440 blocos operate in Rio. Bandas are samba musical bands, also called "street carnival bands", usually formed within a single neighborhood or musical background. The Carnival industry chain amassed in 2012 almost US$1 billion in revenues.

===== Recife, Pernambuco =====
Recife is marked by the parade of the largest carnival block in the world, the Galo da Madrugada. This parade happens on the first Saturday of Carnival (Zé Pereira's Saturday), passes through downtown Recife, and has as symbol a giant rooster that is positioned on the Duarte Coelho Bridge. In this block, there is a great variety of musical genres, but Frevo is the most common one; it is typical of both Recife and Olinda, and is considered an Intangible Heritage of Humanity by Unesco.

===== Salvador, Bahia =====
Salvador has large Carnival celebrations, including the Axé, a typical Bahia music. A truck with giant speakers and a platform, where musicians play songs of local genres such as Axé, samba-reggae, and Arrocha, drives through town with a crowd following while dancing and singing. It was originally staged by two Salvador musicians, Dodo & Osmar, in the 1950s. After the Salvador Carnival, Porto Seguro continues the celebration.

Three circuits make up the festival. Campo Grande is the longest and most traditional. Barra-Ondina is the most famous, on the seaside of Pelourinho and the beaches Barra and Ondina. Ivete Sangalo, Claudia Leitte, Daniela Mercury, Margareth Menezes, Chiclete com Banana, and Banda Eva are some traditional attractions. The party officially lasts six days, but may go on for longer.

==== Canada ====
Toronto Caribbean Carnival, held in Toronto on the first weekend of August to take advantage of more comfortable weather, has its origins in Caribbean Carnival traditions. Tourist attendance at the parade typically exceeds one million.

The Quebec Winter Carnival is one of the biggest winter-themed Carnivals in the world. It depends on snowfall and very cold weather, to keep snowy ski trails in good condition and ice sculptures frozen. The carnival is held during the last days of January and first days of February.

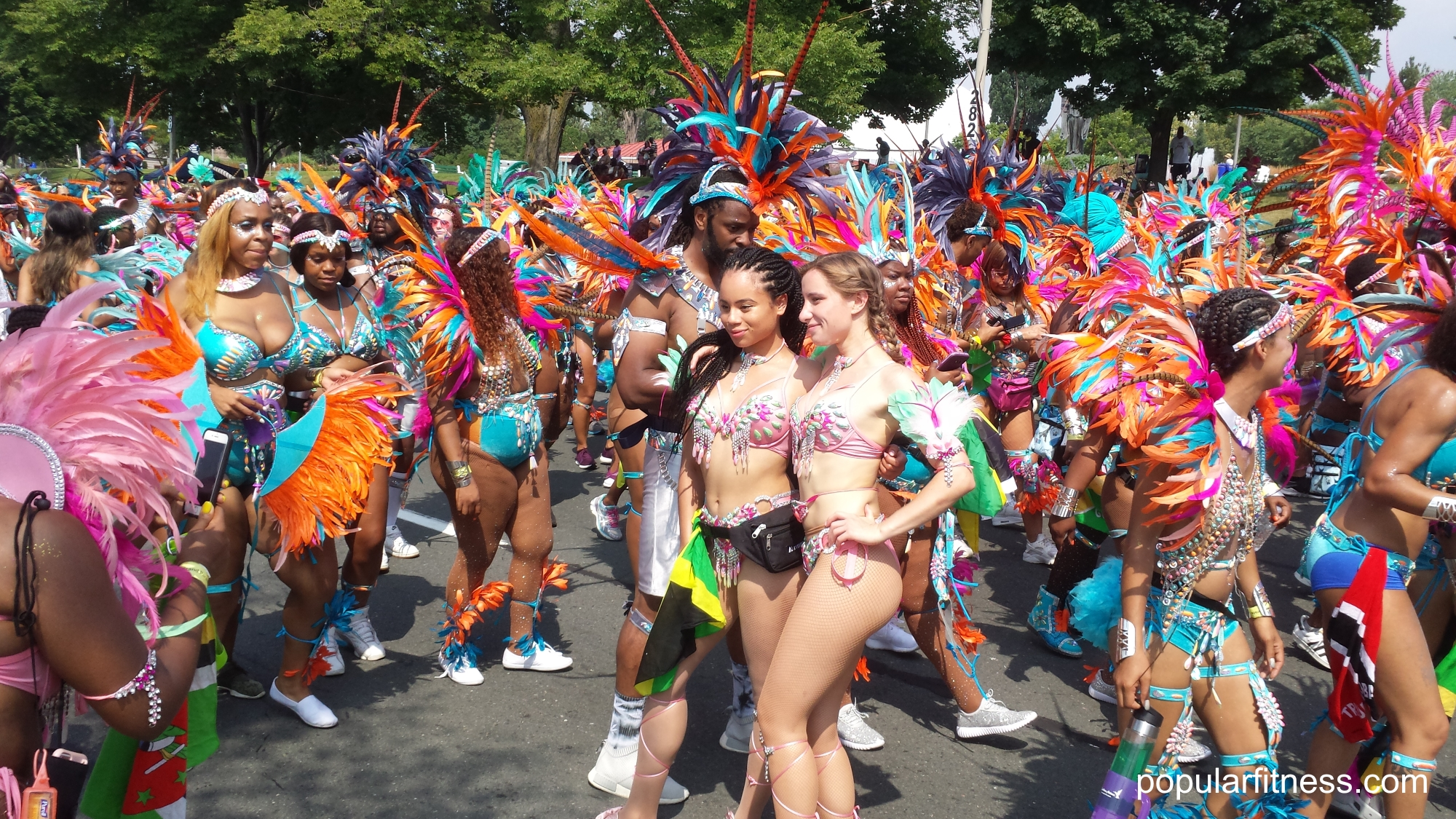
Caribbean Carnival in Toronto, Ontario, Canada

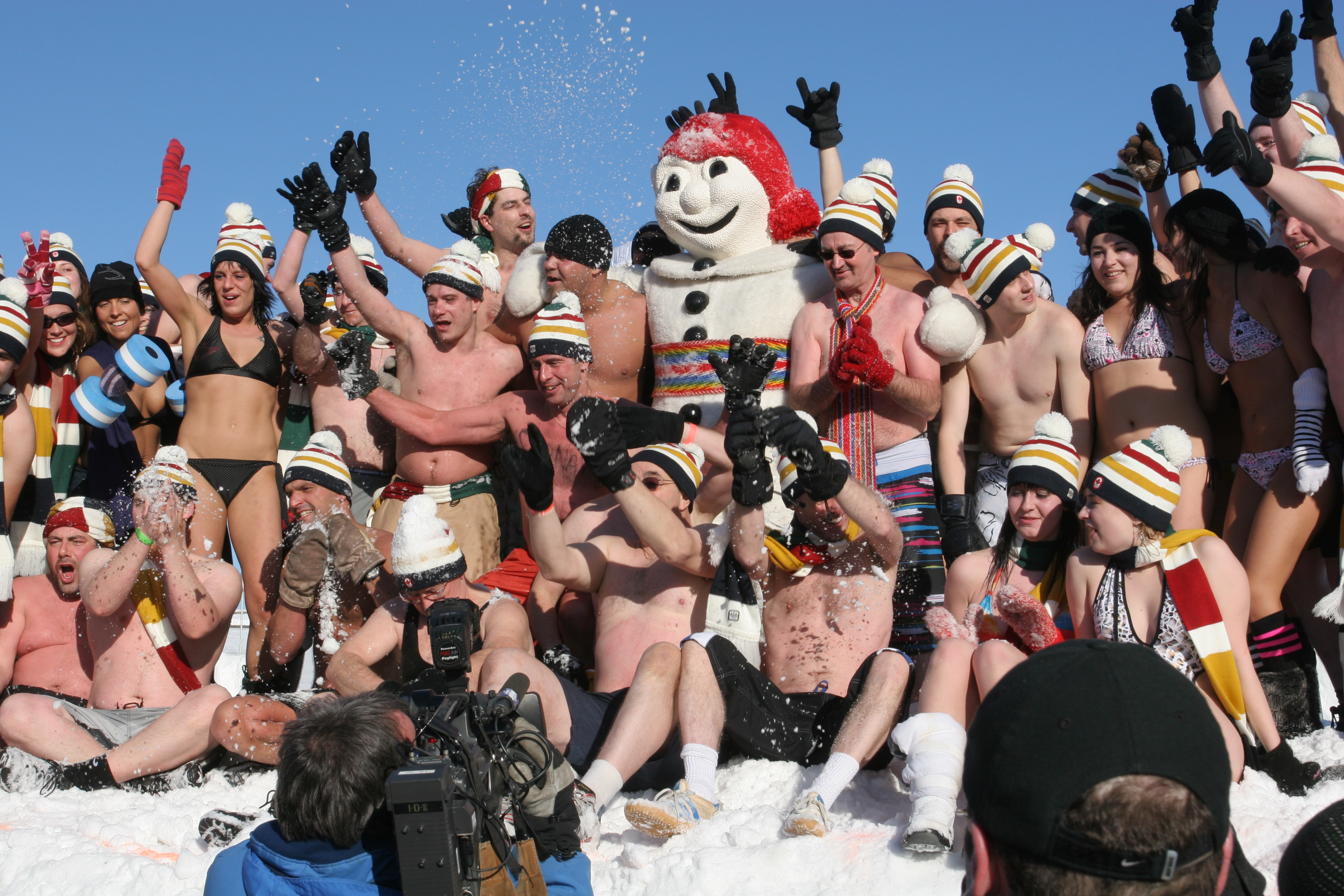
Winter Carnival, taken in Québec City, Québec, Canada

==== Caribbean ====
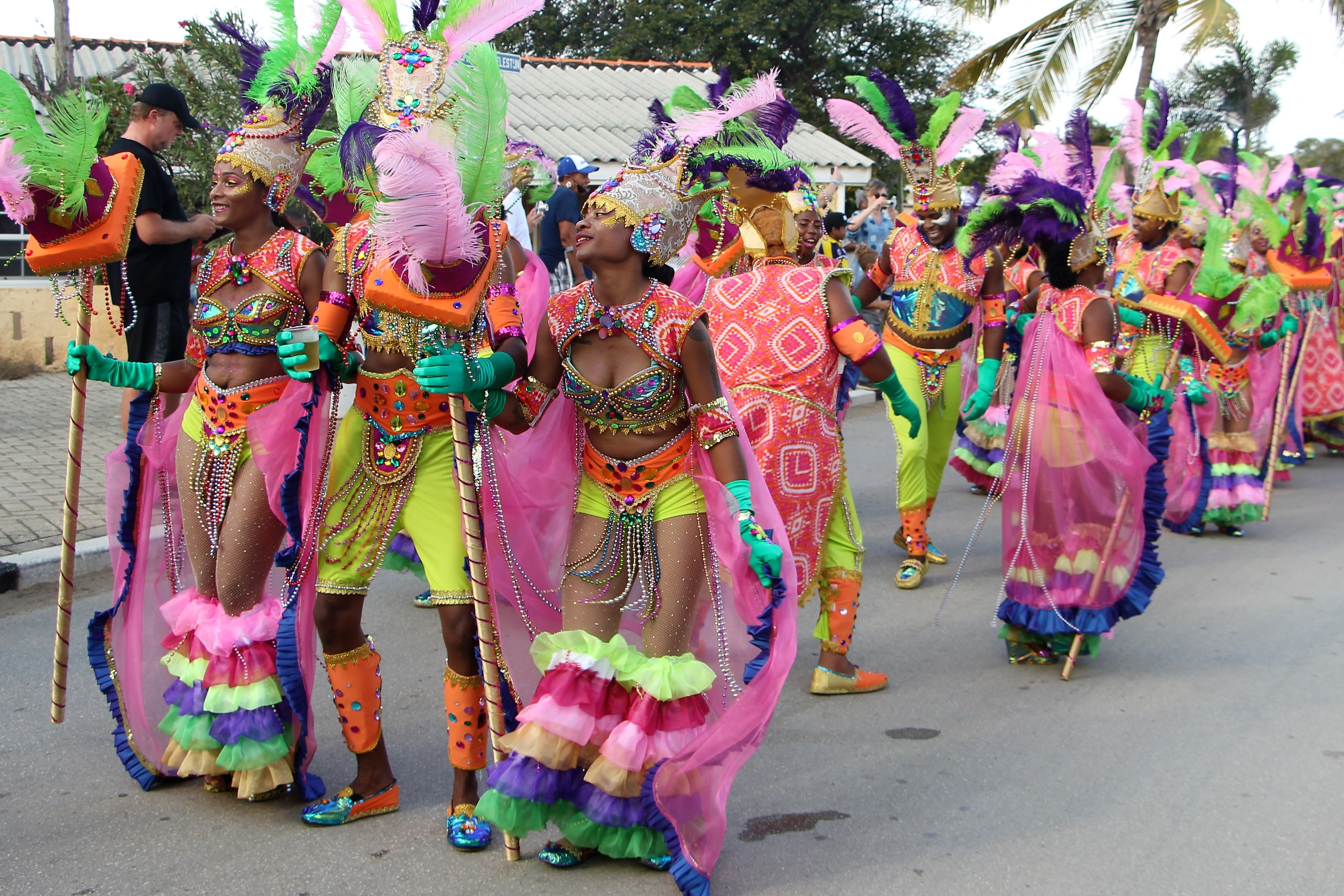
Carnival in Rincon, Bonaire

Most Caribbean islands celebrate Carnival. The largest and most well-known is in Trinidad and Tobago. Antigua, Aruba, Barbados, Bonaire, Cayman Islands, Cuba, Curaçao, Dominica, Dominican Republic, Grenada, Guadeloupe, Guyana, Haiti, Jamaica, Martinique, Puerto Rico, Saba, Sint Eustatius (Statia), Sint Maarten, Saint Lucia, Saint Kitts, Saint Thomas, U.S. Virgin Islands, Saint Vincent, and the Grenadines hold lengthy carnival seasons and large celebrations.

Carnival is an important cultural event in the Dutch Caribbean. Festivities include "jump-up" parades with beautifully colored costumes, floats, and live bands, as well as beauty contests and other competitions. Celebrations include a middle-of-the-night j'ouvert (juvé) parade that ends at sunrise with the burning of a straw King Momo, cleansing sins and bad luck. On Statia, he is called Prince Stupid.

Carnival has been celebrated in Cuba since the 18th century. Participants don costumes demonstrating the island's cultural and ethnic variety.

==== Colombia ====
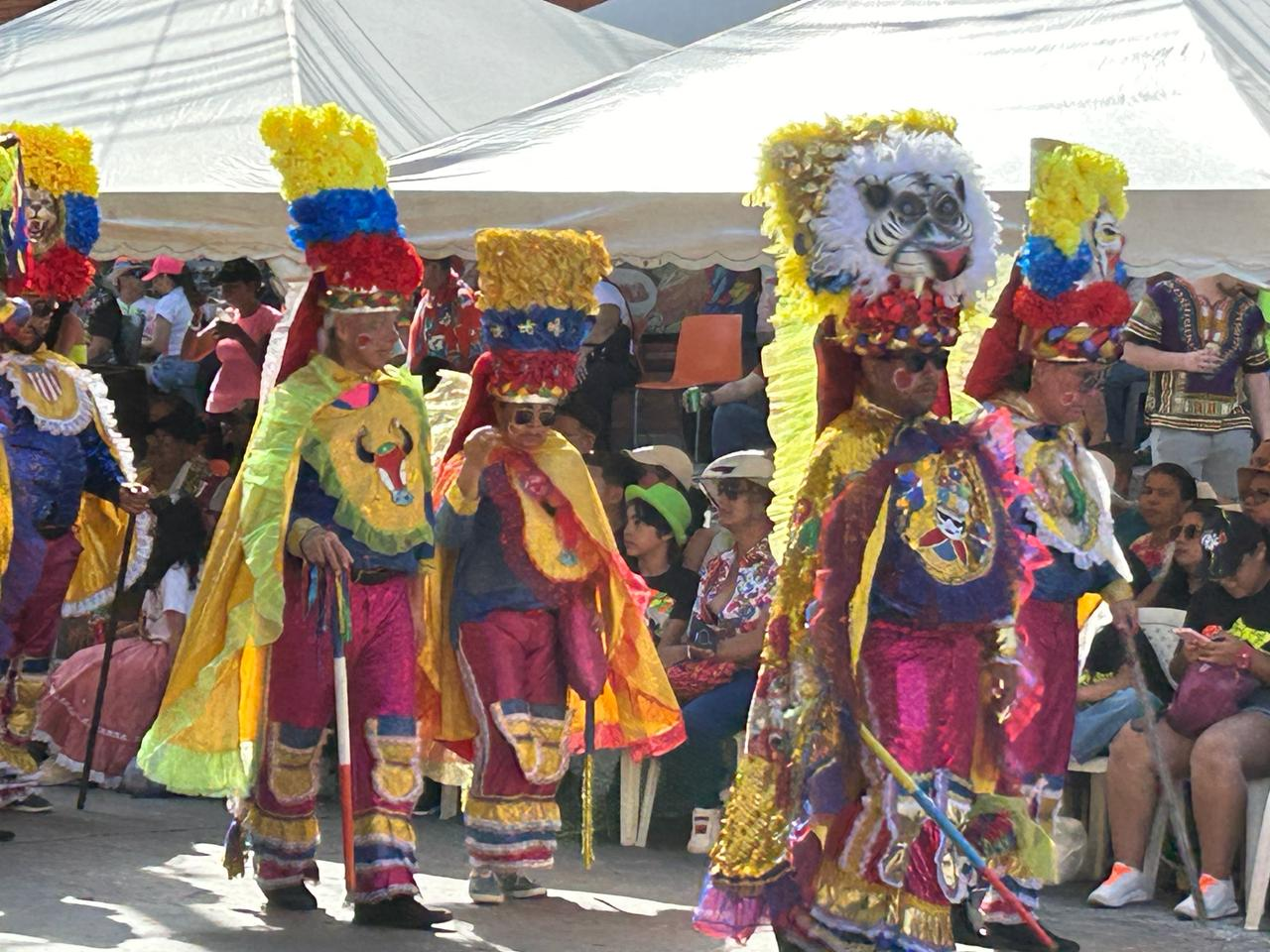
Congos troupe in Barranquilla carnival

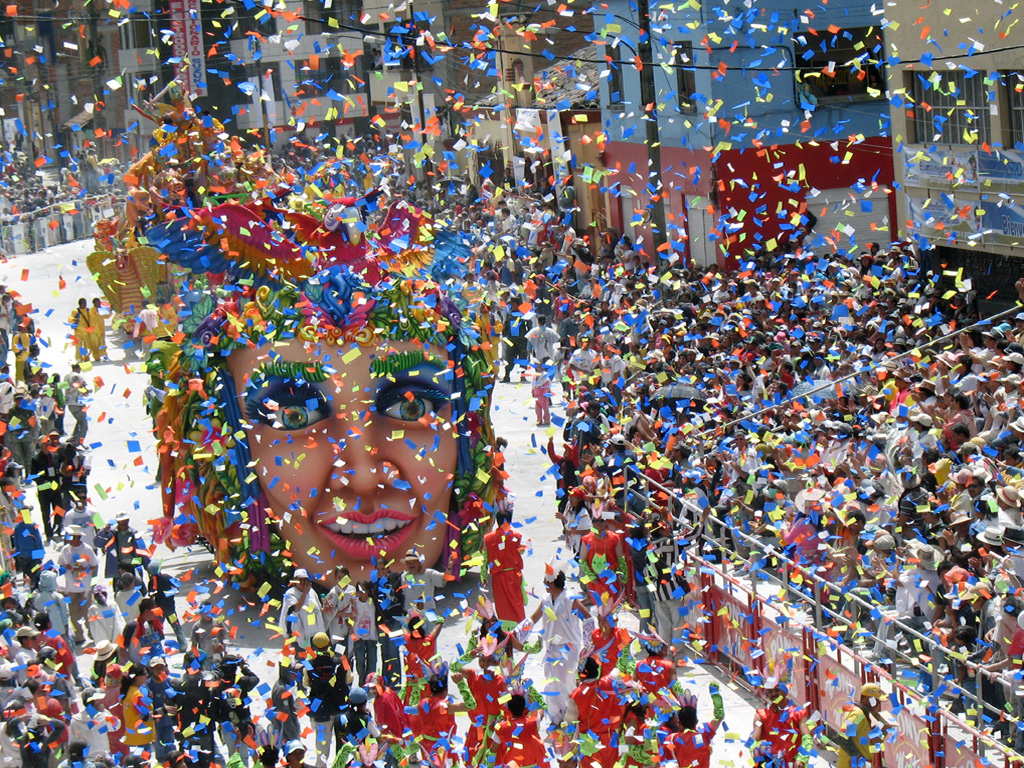
The Blacks and Whites' Carnival in Pasto, Colombia

Carnival was introduced by the Spaniards and incorporated elements from European cultures. It has managed to reinterpret traditions that belonged to Colombia's African and Amerindian cultures. Documentary evidence shows that Carnival existed in Colombia in the 18th century and had already been a cause for concern for colonial authorities, who censored the celebrations, especially in the main political centres such as Cartagena, Bogotá, and Popayán.

The Carnival continued its evolution in small/unimportant towns out of view of the rulers. The result was the uninterrupted celebration of Carnival festivals in Barranquilla (see Barranquilla's Carnival), now recognized as one of the Masterpieces of the Oral and Intangible Heritage of Humanity. The Barranquilla Carnival includes several parades on Friday and Saturday nights beginning on 11 January and ending with a six-day non-stop festival, beginning the Wednesday prior to Ash Wednesday and ending Tuesday midnight. Other celebrations occur in villages along the lower Magdalena River in northern Colombia, and in Pasto and Nariño (see Blacks and Whites' Carnival) in the south of the country. In the early 20th century, attempts to introduce Carnival in Bogotá were rejected by the government. The Bogotá Carnival was renewed in the 21st century.

==== Dominica ====
Carnival in Dominica is held in the capital city of Roseau, and takes elements of Carnival that can be seen in the neighboring French islands of Martinique and Guadeloupe, as well as Trinidad. Notable events leading up to Carnival include the Opening of Carnival celebrations, the Calypso Monarch music competition, the Queen of Carnival Beauty Pageant, and bouyon music bands. Celebrations last for the Monday and Tuesday before Ash Wednesday.

==== Dominican Republic ====
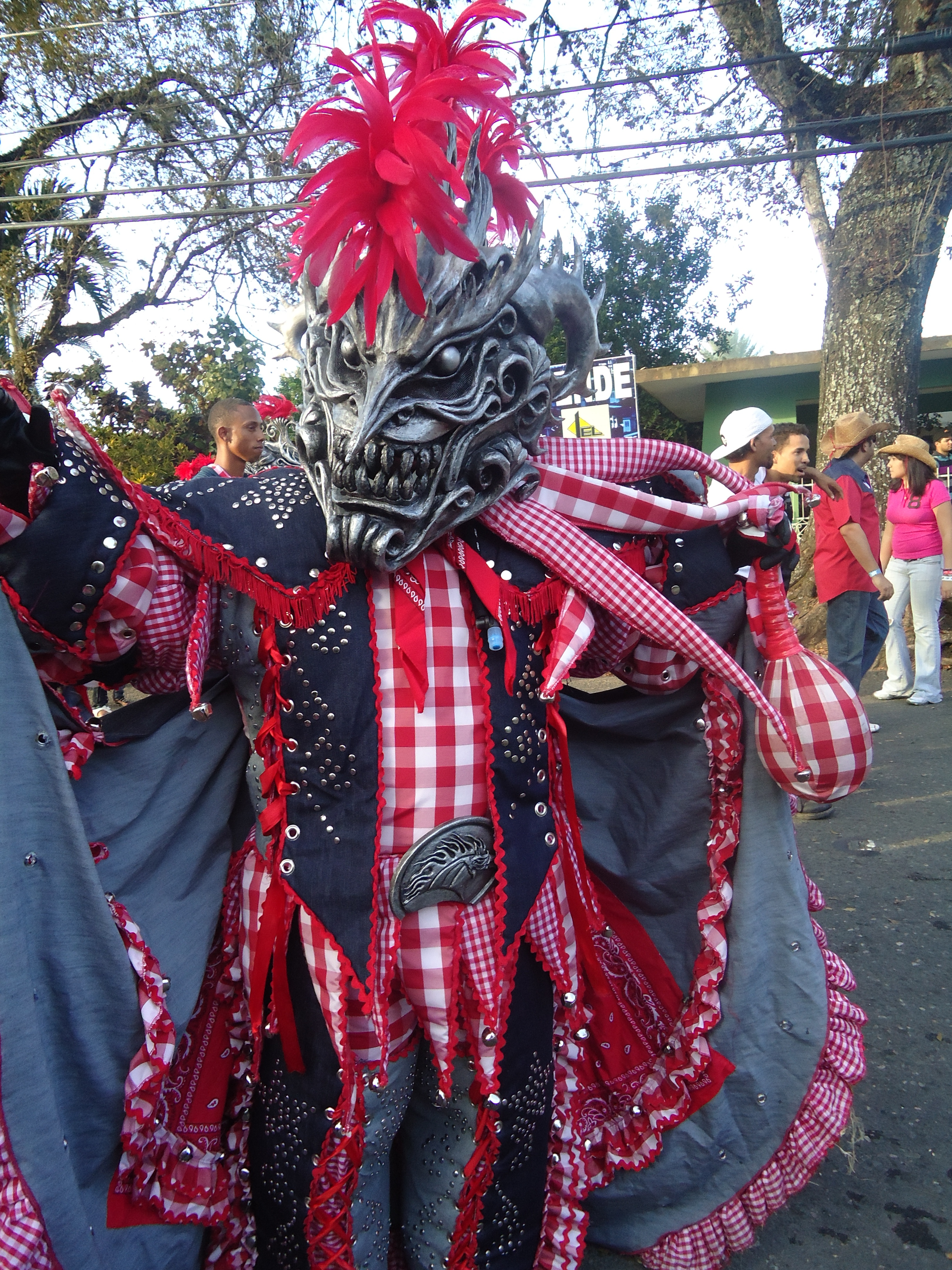
Traditional cojuelo mask of the Dominican carnival in La Vega, Dominican Republic

Dominican Carnival is celebrated in most cities and towns in the main streets during February. Among its main characteristics are its flashy costumes and loud music. The one held in La Vega, which is one of the biggest in the country, and the national parade in Santo Domingo were where the first Carnival of the Americas was held.

Carnival masks are elaborate and colorful. The costumes used on the parades are satires of the Devil and are called "Diablos Cojuelos". They dance, and run to the rhythm of merengue music mixed with techno, hip-hop, and reggaeton. Additional allegorical characters represent Dominican traditions such as "Roba la Gallina" and "Califé".

One of the most international parades is in San Pedro de Macorís. It exhibits the "Guloyas" parade of costumed groups dancing in the streets. Revelers flee from the "Diablos Cojuelos" who try to hit them with "Vejigas".

The timing of the festivals has grown apart from its original religious synchronization with the period of Lent. With National Independence Day on 27 February and the birthday of Juan Pablo Duarte, its founding father, on 26 January, the Carnival celebrations fill February regardless of the Lenten calendar.

==== Ecuador ====
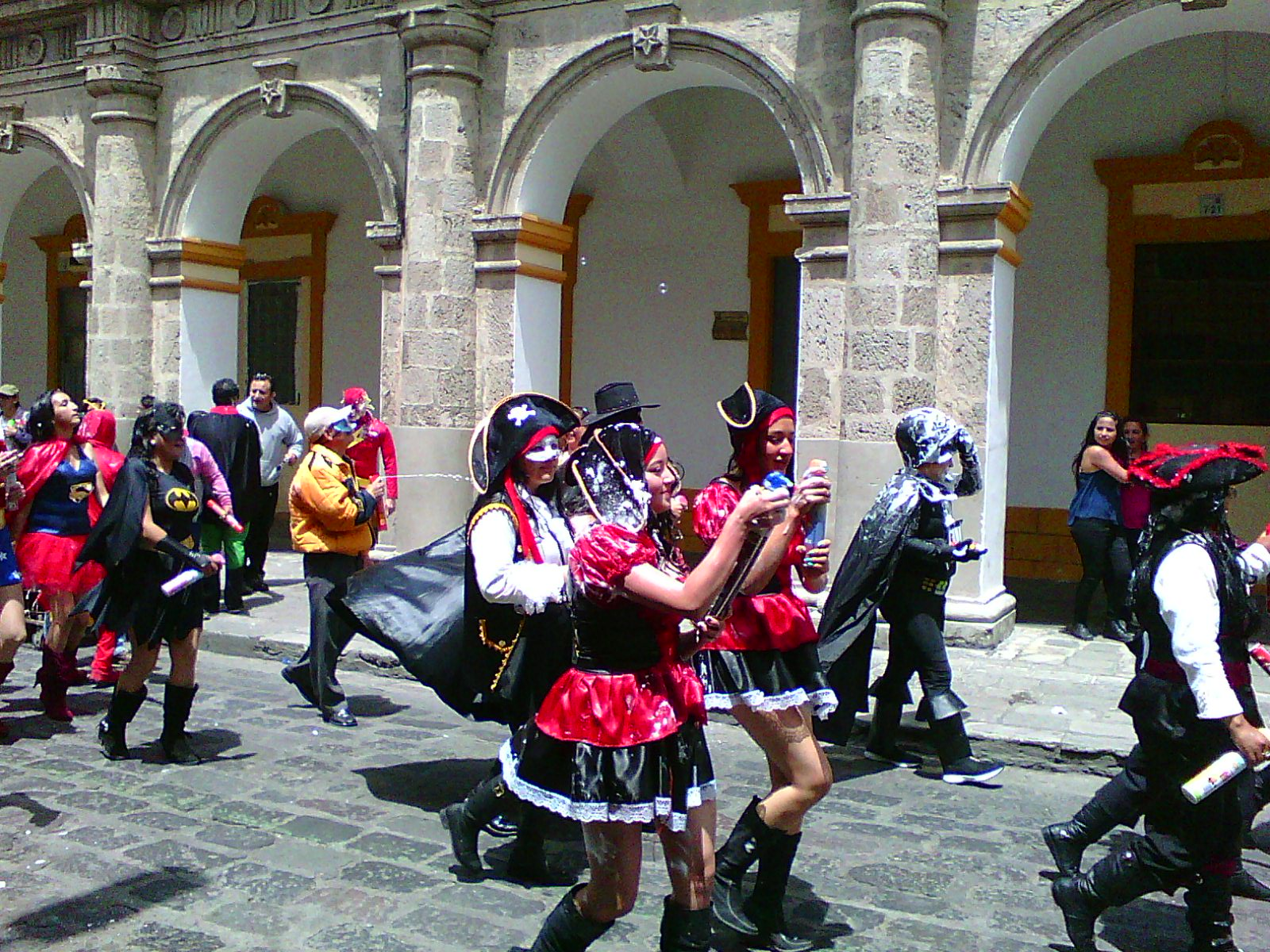
Carnival parade in Latacunga, Ecuador

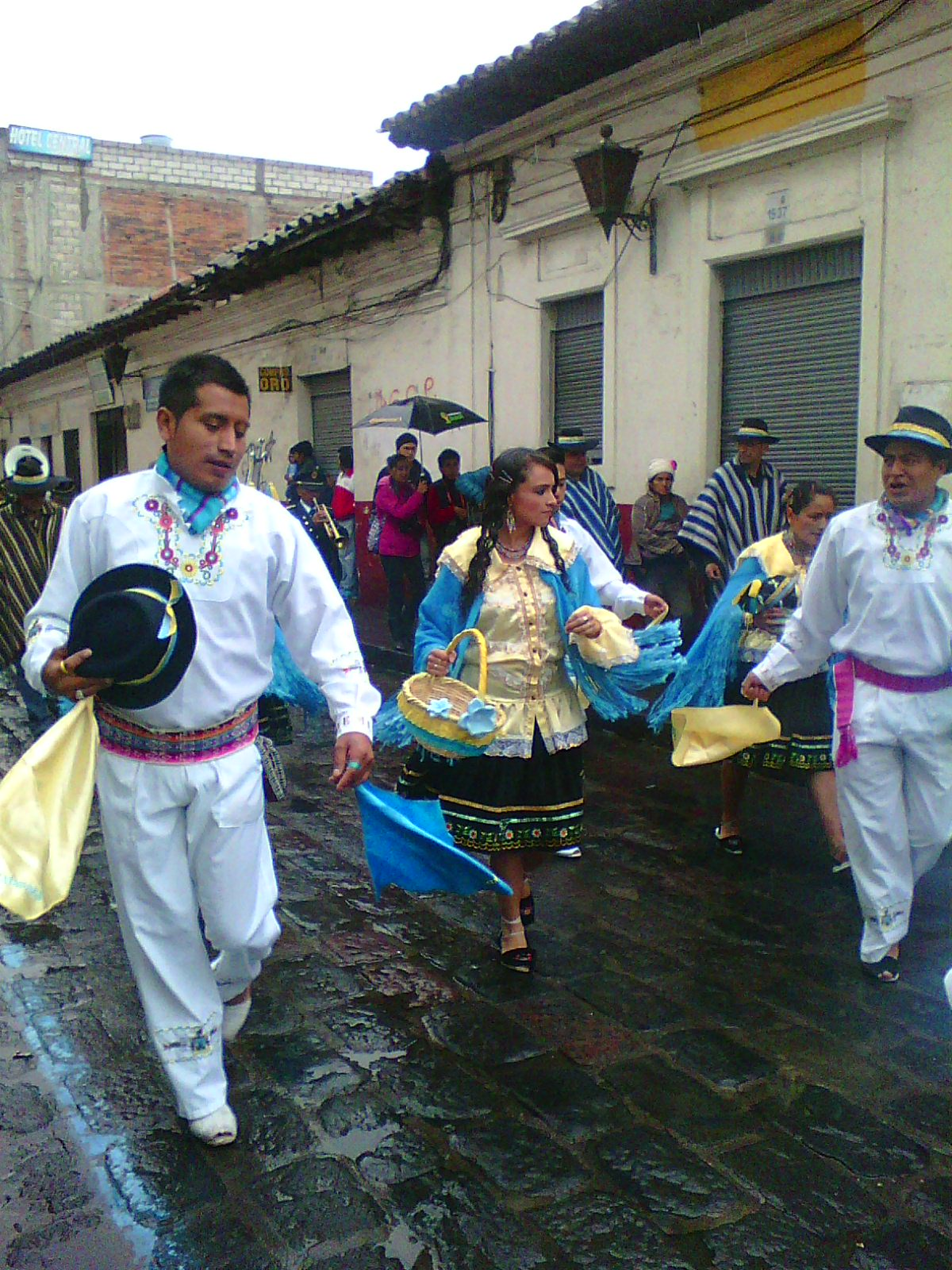
Parade in Latacunga, Ecuador

In Ecuador, the celebrations began before the arrival of Catholicism. The Huarangas Indians (from the Chimbos nation) used to celebrate the second moon of the year with a festival at which they threw flour, flowers, and perfumed water. This Indigenous tradition merged with the Catholic celebration of Carnival.

A common feature of Ecuadorian Carnival is the diablitos (little devils) who play with water. As with snowball fights, the practice of throwing or dumping water on unsuspecting victims is revered by children and teenagers although feared by some adults. Throwing water balloons, sometimes even eggs and flour both to friends and strangers is fun, but can also upset the uninformed.

Although the government as well as school authorities forbid such games, they are widely practiced. Historians tell of a bishop in 1867 who threatened excommunication for the sin of playing Carnival games.

Festivals differ across the country. Locals wear disguises with colorful masks and dance. Usually, the celebrations begin with the election of Taita Carnival (Father Carnival) who heads the festivities and leads the parades in each city.

The most famed Carnival festivities are in Guaranda (Bolivar province) and Ambato (Tungurahua province). In Ambato, the festivities are called Fiesta de las Flores y las Frutas (Festival of the Flowers and Fruits). Other cities have revived Carnival traditions with colorful parades, such as in Azogues (Cañar Province). In Azogues and the Southern Andes in general, Taita Carnival is always an Indigenous Cañari. Recently, a celebration has gained prominence in the northern part of the Andes in the Chota Valley in Imbabura which is a zone of a strong Afro-Ecuadorian population and so the Carnival is celebrated with bomba del chota music.

Latacunga celebrates Carnival in three manners: Carnival with water where people play with water, religious Carnival where people make religious festivity, and Carnival parade in the city in which people march on the Latacunga streets wearing masks while they dance with music bands.

==== French Guiana ====
The Carnival of French Guiana has roots in Creole culture. Everyone participates – mainland French, Brazilians (Guiana has a frontier with Brazil), and Chinese as well as Creoles.

Its duration is variable, determined by movable religious festivals: Carnival begins at Epiphany and ends on Ash Wednesday, and so typically lasts through most of January and February. During this period, from Friday evening until Monday morning the entire country throbs to the rhythm of masked balls and street parades.

Friday afternoons are for eating galette des rois (the cake of kings) and drinking champagne. The cake may be flavoured with frangipani, guava, or coconut.

On Sunday afternoons, major parades fill the streets of Cayenne, Kourou, and Saint-Laurent du Maroni. Competing groups prepare for months. Dressed to follow the year's agreed theme, they march with Carnival floats, drums, and brass bands.

Brazilian groups are appreciated for their elaborate feathered and sequined costumes. However, they are not eligible for competition since the costumes do not change over time.

Mythical characters appear regularly in the parades:

- Karolin − a small person dressed in a magpie tail and top hat, riding on a shrew;
- Les Nèg'marrons − groups of men dressed in red loincloths, bearing ripe tomatoes in their mouths while their bodies are smeared with grease or molasses. They deliberately try to come in contact with spectators, soiling their clothes;
- Les makoumés − cross-dressing men (out of the Carnival context, makoumé is a pejorative term for a homosexual);
- Soussouris (the bat) − a character dressed in a winged leotard from head to foot, usually black in colour. Traditionally malevolent, this character is liable to chase spectators and "sting" them.

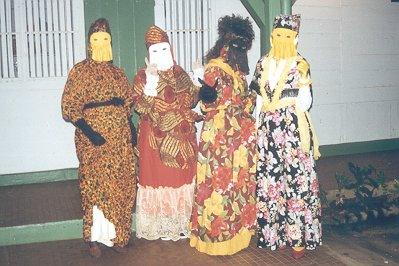
Four touloulous

A uniquely Creole tradition are the touloulous. These women wear decorative gowns, gloves, masks, and headdresses that cover them completely, making them unrecognisable, even to the colour of their skin. On Friday and Saturday nights of Carnival, touloulou balls are held in so-called "universities", large dance halls that open only at Carnival time. Touloulous get in free, and are even given condoms in the interest of the sexual health of the community. Men attend the balls, but they pay admittance and are not disguised. The touloulous pick their dance partners, who may not refuse. The setup is designed to make it easy for a woman to create a temporary liaison with a man in total anonymity. Undisguised women are not welcomed. By tradition, if such a woman gets up to dance, the orchestra stops playing. Alcohol is served at bars – the disguised women whisper to the men "touloulou thirsty", at which a round of drinks is expected, to be drunk through a straw protect their anonymity.

In more modern times, Guyanais men have attempted to turn the tables by staging soirées tololo, in which it is the men who, in disguise, seek partners from undisguised women bystanders.

The final four days of Carnival follow a rigid schedule, and no work is done:

- Sunday − The Grand Parade, in which the groups compete.
- Monday − Marriage burlesque, with men dressed as brides and women as grooms.
- Tuesday − Red Devil Day in which everyone wears red or black.
- (Ash) Wednesday − Dress is black and white only, for the grand ceremony of burning the effigy of Vaval, King Carnival.

==== Guatemala ====
The Mazatenango carnival is a two- or three-day celebration that has been celebrated in this city for more than a century. Though secular in nature, it takes place immediately before Christian Lent begins. Early celebrations included bull fights, and modern celebrations include the wearing of masks and costumes, the selection of an Ugly King and the Queen of the Carnival, dances, and a variety of games.

==== Haiti ====
Carnival in Haiti started in 1804 in the capital Port-au-Prince after the declaration of independence. The Port-au-Prince Carnival is one of the largest in North America. It is known as Kanaval in the Creole language. It starts in January, known as "Pre-Kanaval", while the main carnival activities begin in February. In July 2012, Haiti had another carnival called Kanaval de Fleur. Beautiful costumes, floats, Rara festival parades, masks, foods, and popular rasin music (such as Boukman Eksperyans, Foula Vodoule, Tokay, Boukan Ginen, and Eritaj) and kompa bands (such as T-Vice, Djakout No. 1, Sweet Micky, Kreyòl La, D.P. Express, Mizik Mizik, Ram, T-Micky, Carimi, Djakout Mizik, and Scorpio Fever) play for dancers in the streets of the plaza of Champ-de-Mars, Port-au-Prince. A song competition takes place.

Other places in Haiti celebrate carnival, including Jacmel and Aux Cayes. In 2013, Kanaval was celebrated in Okap (Cap-Haïtien).

Carnival finishes on Ash Wednesday, followed by rara festival, another parading musical tradition known mainly in Haiti and in the Dominican Republic. This festival emphasises religion. Songs are composed each year, and bands play bamboo tubes (vaksin) and homemade horns (konèt). Rara is also performed in Prospect and Central Park in summertime New York.

==== Honduras ====
In La Ceiba in Honduras, Carnival is held on the third or fourth Saturday of every May to commemorate San Isidro. It is the largest Carnival celebration in Central America.

==== Jamaica ====
The Jamaica Carnival is a week-long celebration that takes place near the end of March or beginning of April, right after Easter. Music like dancehall, reggae and soca revelry are usually involved in the parade and dances.

==== Mexico ====
In Mexico, Carnaval is celebrated in about 225 cities and towns. The largest are in Mazatlán and the city of Veracruz, with others in Baja California and Yucatán. The larger city Carnavals employ costumes, elected queens, and parades with floats, but Carnaval celebrations in smaller and rural areas vary widely depending on the level of European influence during Mexico's colonial period. The largest of these is in Huejotzingo, Puebla, where most townspeople take part in mock combat with rifles shooting blanks, roughly based on the Battle of Puebla. Other important states with local traditions include Morelos, Oaxaca, Tlaxcala, and Chiapas. Carnaval of Campeche goes back 400 years, to 1582.

==== Nicaragua ====
On the Caribbean coast of Bluefields, Nicaragua, Carnival is better known as "Palo de Mayo" (or Mayo Ya!) and is celebrated every day of May.

In Managua, it is celebrated for two days. There it is named Alegria por la vida ("Joy for Life") and features a different theme each year. Another festival in Managua celebrates patron saint Domingo de Guzman and lasts ten days.

==== Panama ====
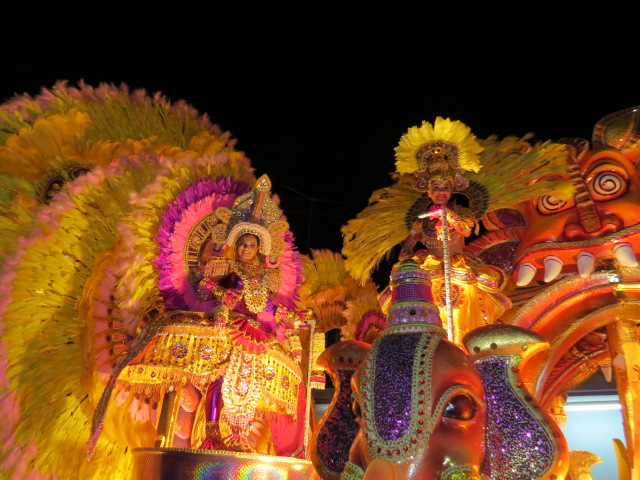
Two Queens, representing Calle Arriba and Calle Abajo, standing on a float

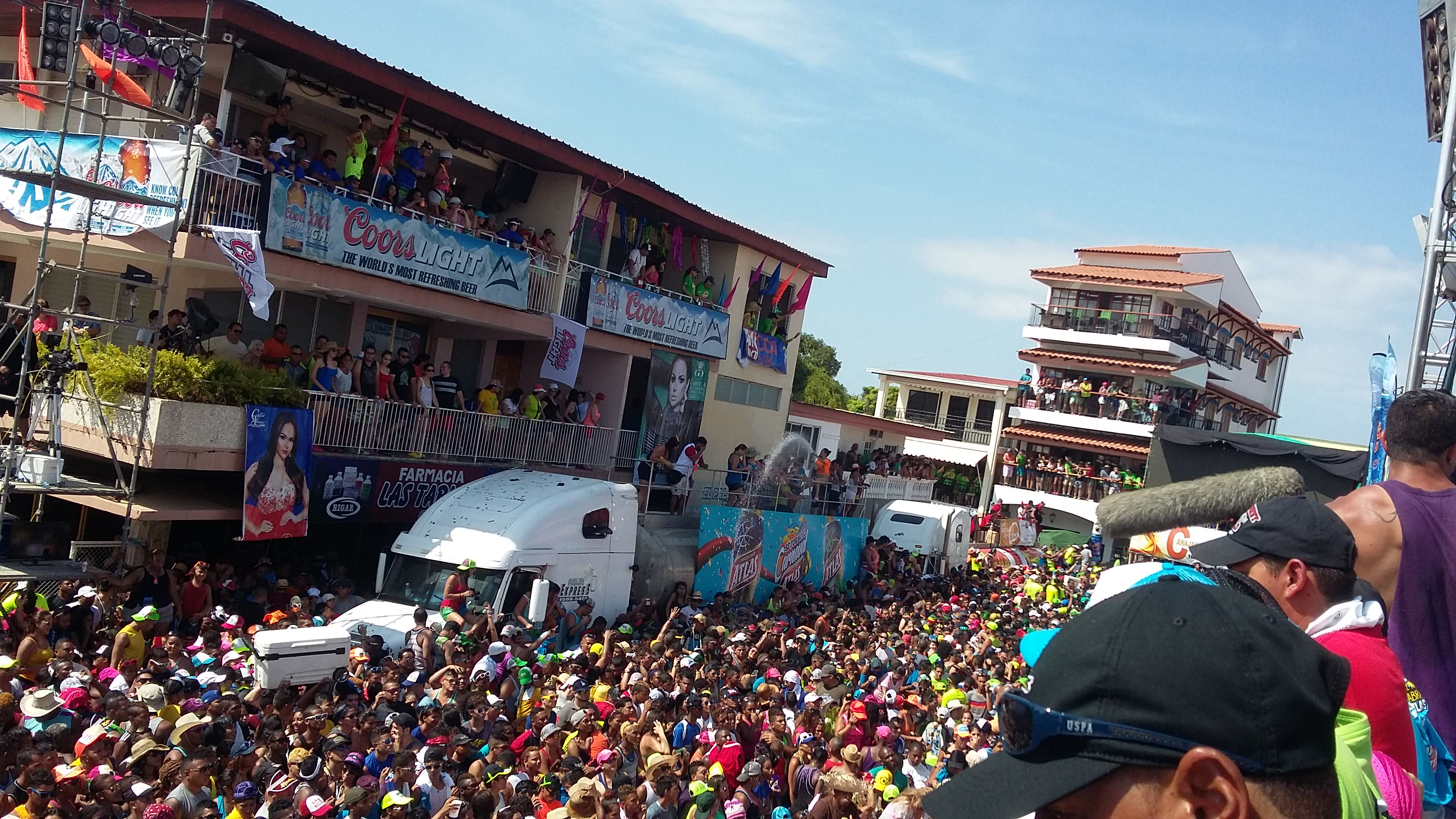
A culeco

Traditionally beginning on Friday and ending on the Tuesday before Ash Wednesday, "los Carnavales", as Panamanians refer to the days of Carnival, are celebrated across the country. Carnival Week is especially popular in the sleepy town of Las Tablas. The population multiplies because of the opulent Carnival celebrations. Carnival celebrations in Panama City and almost all of the Azuero Peninsula are popular tourist attractions. Penonomé features a parade on the Rio Zarati as a unique Carnival event.

Besides Las Tablas, there are several other places in Panama where Carnival is celebrated. Pedasí, Tonosí, Chitré, and Ocú are also located on the Azuero Peninsula, as is Las Tablas. In Coclé, Carnival is celebrated in Penonomé and Aguadulce, as well as in Panama City, which seeks to organize a celebration to attract tourists. Carnival is also celebrated in nearby towns such as La Chorrera and 24 de Diciembre. On the Panamanian Caribbean coast, Carnival is celebrated in places like Bocas del Toro and Portobelo. However, there are no queens; instead, it is common to see devils.

The Panamanian Carnival is also popular because of the concerts featuring popular artists in the most visited areas. Concerts are often carried out during the night, and continue until the next morning.

Carnival Week is a national holiday in Panama, with most businesses and government offices remaining closed during its duration, and with most Panamanians opting to go to the country's rural areas to participate on the Carnivals and visit their relatives.

Carnivals in Panama also feature large repurposed fuel trucks that are used for soaking attendees through the use of firehoses that are controlled and directed by one or more people that stand in a platform that is mounted on top of the truck. This is known as "culecos" or "los culecos". Trucks get their water from nearby, government-approved rivers, and the water is tested for cleanliness before use. Culecos are often performed from 10 am to 3 pm, when the sun is at its brightest. Children and pregnant women are banned from participating in the culecos, and the trucks are always sponsored by a well-known Panamanian company or brand. The culecos are also often accompanied by reggaeton concerts.

The open consumption of large amounts of cold, low-alcohol beer or Smirnoff, stored in ice-filled coolers, is common among attendees. Just like in Rio de Janeiro, some carnivals also feature floats, but they may have young women with elaborate costumes that stand as the "Queens" of "Calle Arriba" and "Calle Abajo", representing rich and working-class people, respectively. The queens are chosen through a contest and announced on October of the previous year, and are replaced every year. The queens are introduced on the first carnival day, and are always accompanied by a music band, who are present whenever the queens are present. Fireworks are launched on the last carnival night, to signal the end of the carnival.

==== Peru ====
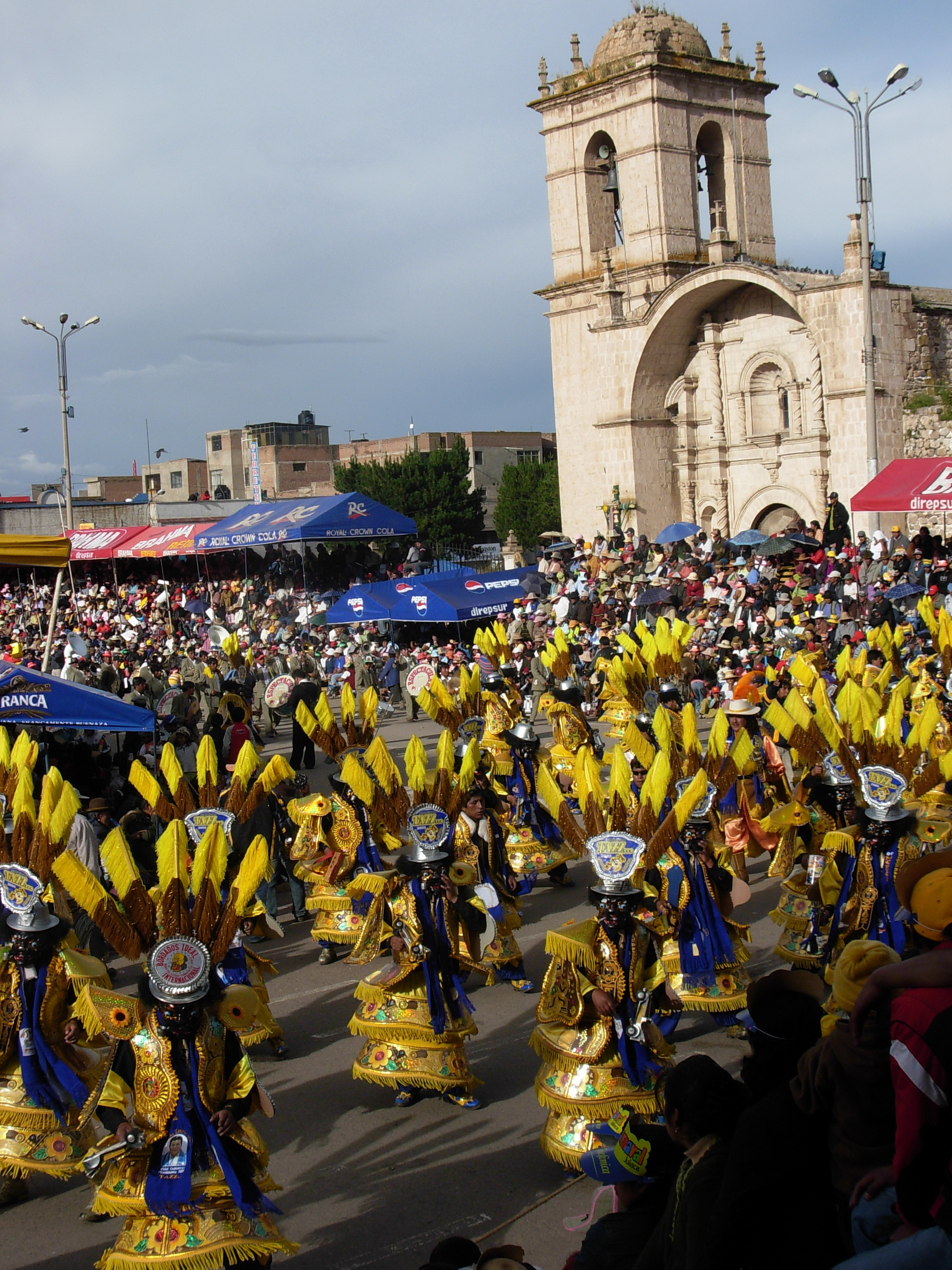
Morenada dance, in the Carnival of Juliaca, Peru

===== Cajamarca =====
The town of Cajamarca is considered the capital of Carnival in Peru. Local residents of all ages dance around the unsha, or yunsa, a tree adorned with ribbons, balloons, toys, fruits, bottles of liquor, and other prizes.

At a certain point, the Mayordomo (governor of the feast) walks into the circle. The governor chooses a partner to go to the unsha, which they attempt to cut down by striking it three times with a machete. The machete is passed from couple to couple as each strikes the tree three times. When the unsha finally falls, the crowd rushes to grab the prizes.

The person who successfully brings down the unsha becomes the following year's governor.

===== Crime =====
While generally peaceful, there have been issues with people using Carnival as a pretext for crime, particularly robbery or vandalism, especially in certain areas of Lima.

==== Trinidad and Tobago ====
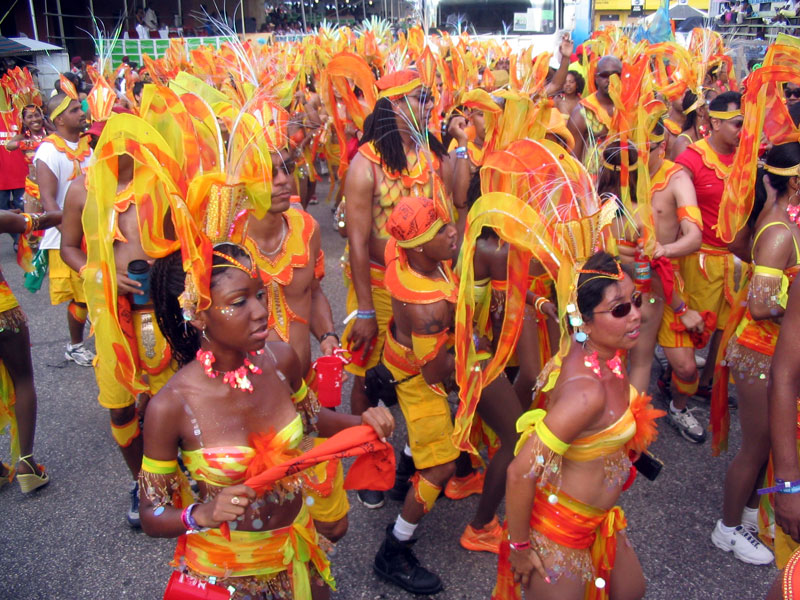
Masqueraders chipping on Carnival Tuesday in Port of Spain during Trinidad and Tobago Carnival

In Trinidad and Tobago, Carnival lasts months and culminates in large celebrations on the three days before Ash Wednesday with Dimanche Gras, J'ouvert, and Mas (masquerade). Tobago's celebration culminates on Monday and Tuesday on a much smaller scale, however Tobago hosted its inaugural standalone carnival on October 28–30, 2022 Carnival combines costumes, dance, music, competitions, rum, and partying (fete-ing). Music styles include soca, calypso, rapso, and more recently chutney and chutney soca.

The annual Carnival steel pan competition known as the National Panorama competition holds the finals on the Saturday before the main event. Pan players compete in categories such as "Conventional Steel Band" or "Single Pan Band" by performing renditions of the year's calypsos.

"Dimanche Gras" takes place on the Sunday night before Ash Wednesday. Here the Calypso Monarch is chosen (after competition) and prize money and a vehicle awarded. The King and Queen of the bands are crowned, where each band parades costumes for two days and submits a king and queen, from which an overall winner is chosen. These usually involve huge, complex, beautiful well-crafted costumes, that includes 'wire-bending'.

J'ouvert, or "Dirty Mas", takes place before dawn on the Monday (known as Carnival Monday) before Ash Wednesday. It means "opening of the day". Revelers dress in costumes embodying puns on current affairs, especially political and social events. "Clean Mud" (clay mud), oil paint and body paint are familiar during J'ouvert. A common character is "Jab-jabs" (devils, blue, black, or red) complete with pitchfork, pointed horns and tails. A King and Queen of J'ouvert are chosen, based on their witty political/social messages.

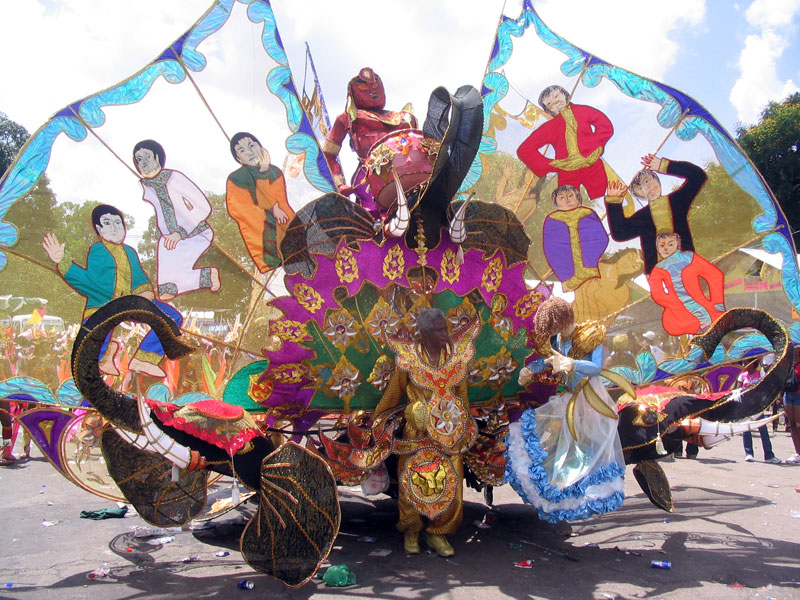
The Carnival King costume for a particular band

Carnival Monday involves the parade of the mas bands. Revelers wear only parts of their costumes, more for fun than display or competition. Monday Night Mas is popular in most towns and especially the capital, where smaller bands compete. There is also the "Bomb Competition", a smaller-scaled judging of steel bands.

Carnival Tuesday hosts the main events. Full costume is worn, complete with make-up and body paint/adornment. Usually "Mas Boots" that complement the costumes are worn. Each band has their costume presentation based on a particular theme, and contains various sections (some consisting of thousands of revelers) that reflect these themes. The street parade and band costume competition take place. The mas bands eventually converge on the Queen's Park Savannah to pass on "The Stage" for judging. The singer of the most played song is crowned Road March King or Queen, earning prize money and usually a vehicle.

This parading and revelry goes on until Tuesday midnight. Ash Wednesday itself, while not an official holiday, sends flocks to local beaches. The most popular are Maracas Beach and Manzanilla Beach, where huge beach parties take place on Ash Wednesday.

==== United States ====
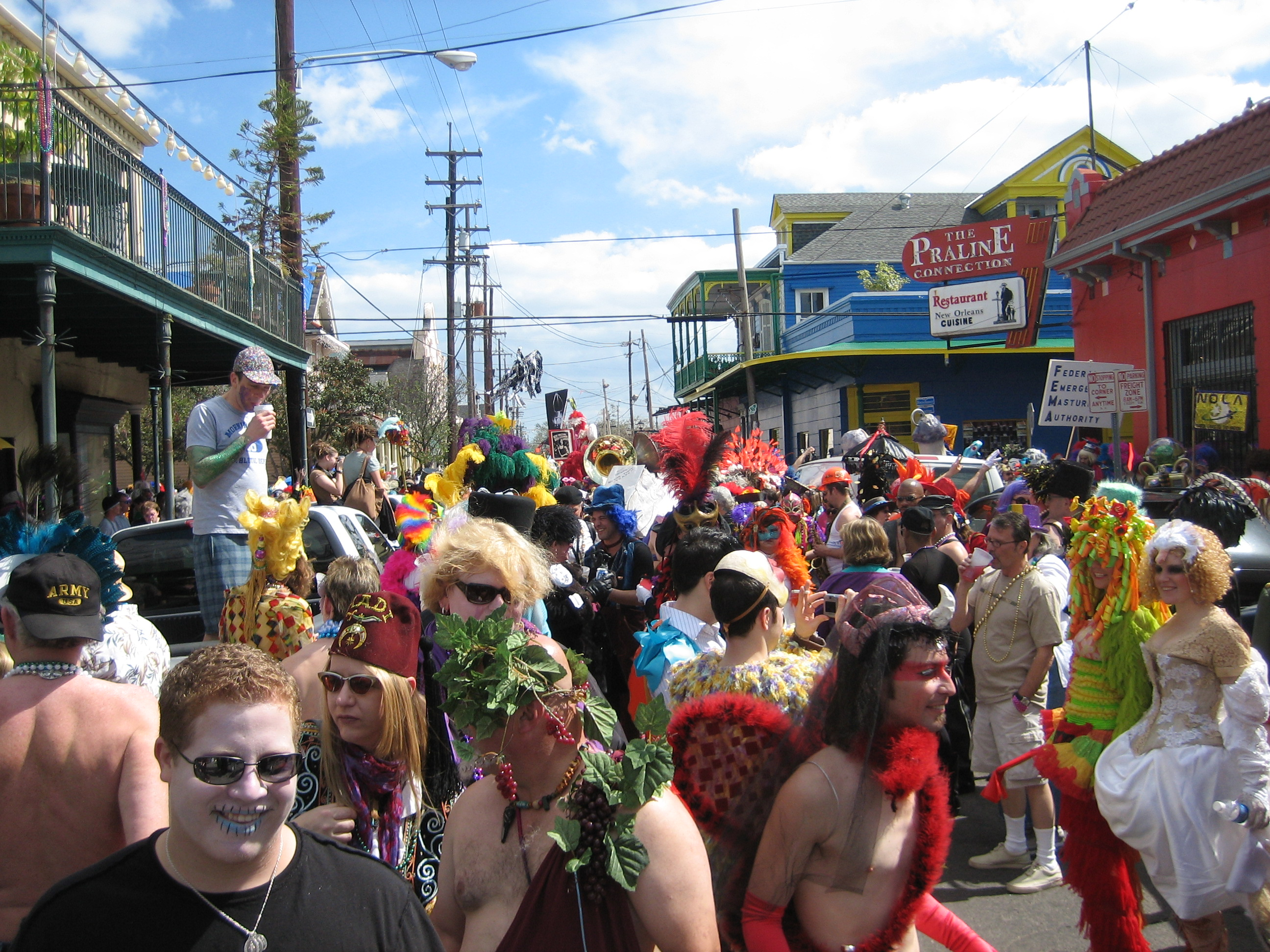
Revelers on Frenchmen Street, in New Orleans, USA

Carnival celebrations, usually referred to as Mardi Gras ("Fat Tuesday" in French), were first celebrated in the Gulf Coast area, but now occur in many states. Customs originated in the onetime French colonial capitals of Mobile (now in Alabama), New Orleans (Louisiana), and Biloxi (Mississippi), all of which have celebrated for many years with street parades and masquerade balls. Other major American cities with celebrations include Washington, D.C.; St. Louis, Missouri; San Francisco and San Diego, California; Galveston, Texas; and Pensacola, Tampa,Orlando, and Miami in Florida.

The most widely known, elaborate, and popular U.S. events are in New Orleans, where krewes organize parades, balls, and other activities starting with Phunny Phorty Phellows streetcar parade on Twelfth Night and ending with the closing of Bourbon Street at midnight on Fat Tuesday. It is often called "the greatest free party on earth". Many other Louisiana cities such as Lake Charles, Baton Rouge, Shreveport, Lafayette, Mamou, Houma, and Thibodaux, most of which were under French control at one time or another, also hold Carnival celebrations. On the prairie country northwest of Lafayette, Louisiana, the Cajuns celebrate the traditional Courir de Mardi Gras, which has its roots in celebrations from rural Medieval France.

In Puerto Rico, the most popular festivals are the Carnaval de Loíza and Carnaval de Ponce. The Carnaval de Ponce (officially "Carnaval Ponceño") is celebrated annually in Ponce. The celebration lasts one week and ends on the day before Ash Wednesday. It is one of the oldest carnivals of the Western Hemisphere, dating to 1858. Some authorities trace the Ponce Carnaval to the eighteenth century.

In New York City, a Caribbean Carnival known as the West Indian Day Parade is held in Crown Heights, Brooklyn on Labor Day. Founded by immigrants from Trinidad, the event was initially held at the beginning of Lent, but was later moved to Labor Day in order to allow an outdoor event in the summer.

Starting in 2013, the Slovenian-American community located in the St. Clair-Superior neighborhood of Cleveland began hosting a local version of Kurentovanje, the Carnival event held in the city of Ptuj, Slovenia. The event is conducted on the Saturday prior to Ash Wednesday.

==== Uruguay ====
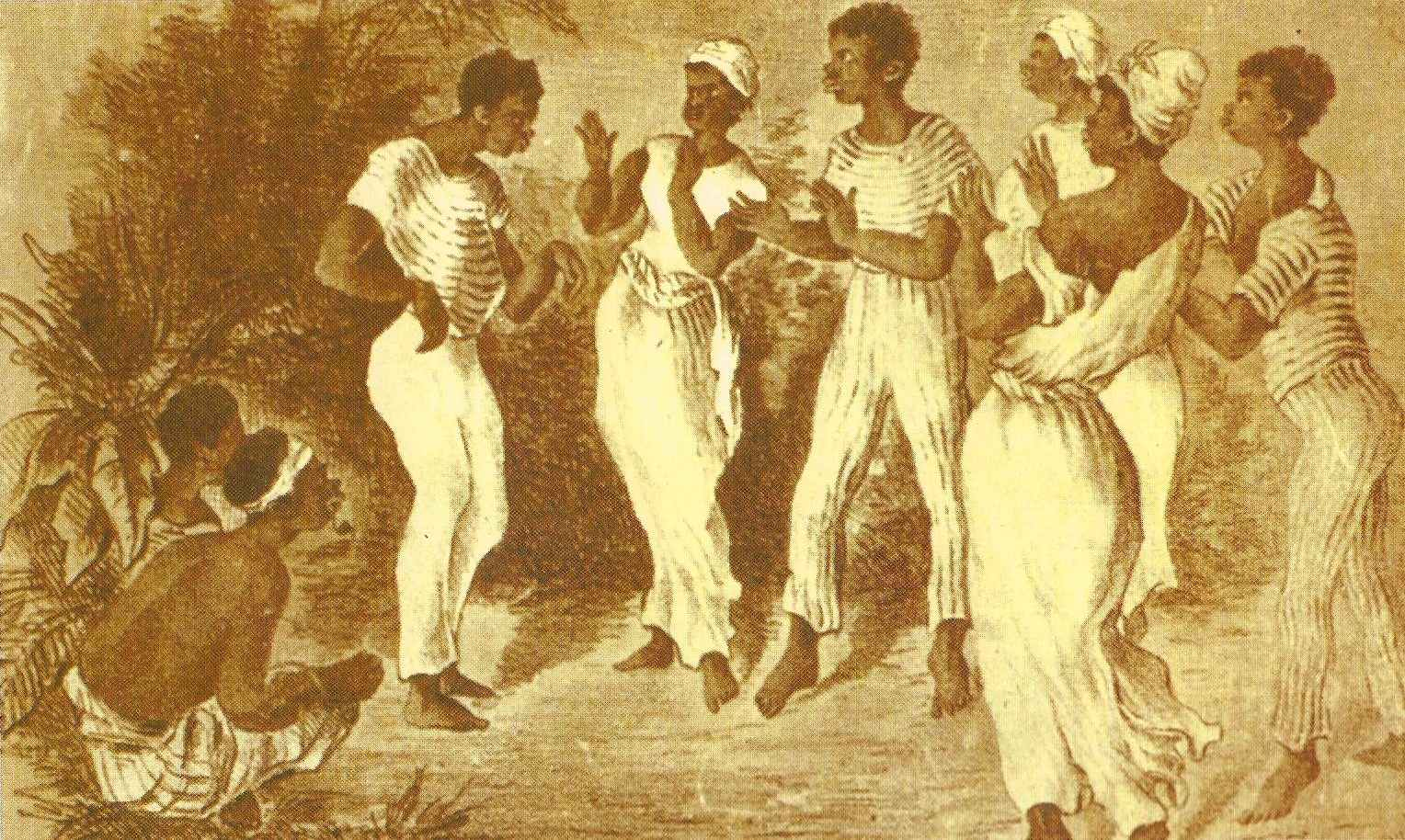
Afro-Uruguayans gathering for a Candombe celebration, c. 1870

The Carnival in Uruguay lasts more than 40 days, generally beginning towards the end of January and running through mid March. Celebrations in Montevideo are the largest. The festival is performed in the European parade style with elements from Bantu and Angolan Benguela cultures imported with slaves in colonial times. The main attractions of Uruguayan Carnival include two colorful parades called Desfile de Carnaval (Carnival Parade) and Desfile de Llamadas (Calls Parade, a candombe-summoning parade).

During the celebration, theaters called tablados are built in many places throughout the cities, especially in Montevideo. Traditionally formed by men and now starting to be open to women, the different Carnival groups (Murgas, Lubolos, or Parodistas) perform a kind of popular opera at the tablados, singing and dancing songs that generally relate to the social and political situation. The 'Calls' groups, basically formed by drummers playing the tamboril, perform candombe rhythmic figures. The carnival in Uruguay have escolas de samba too, and the biggest samba parades are in Artigas and in Montevideo. Revelers wear their festival clothing. Vedettes, exuberant women wearing elegant, bright dresses, are also part of the parades.. Each group has its own theme.

European archetypes (Pierrot, Harlequin, and Columbina) merge with African ancestral elements (the Old Mother or Mama Vieja, the Medicine Man or Gramillero and the Magician or Escobero) in the festival.

==== Venezuela ====
Carnival in Venezuela covers two days, 40 days before Easter. It is a time when youth in many rural towns have water fights (including the use of water balloons and water guns). Any pedestrian risks getting soaked. Coastal towns and provinces celebrate Carnival more fervently than elsewhere in the country. Venezuelans regard Carnival about the same way they regard Christmas and Semana Santa (Holy Week; the week before Easter Sunday) when they take the opportunity to visit their families.

=== Asia ===
==== India ====
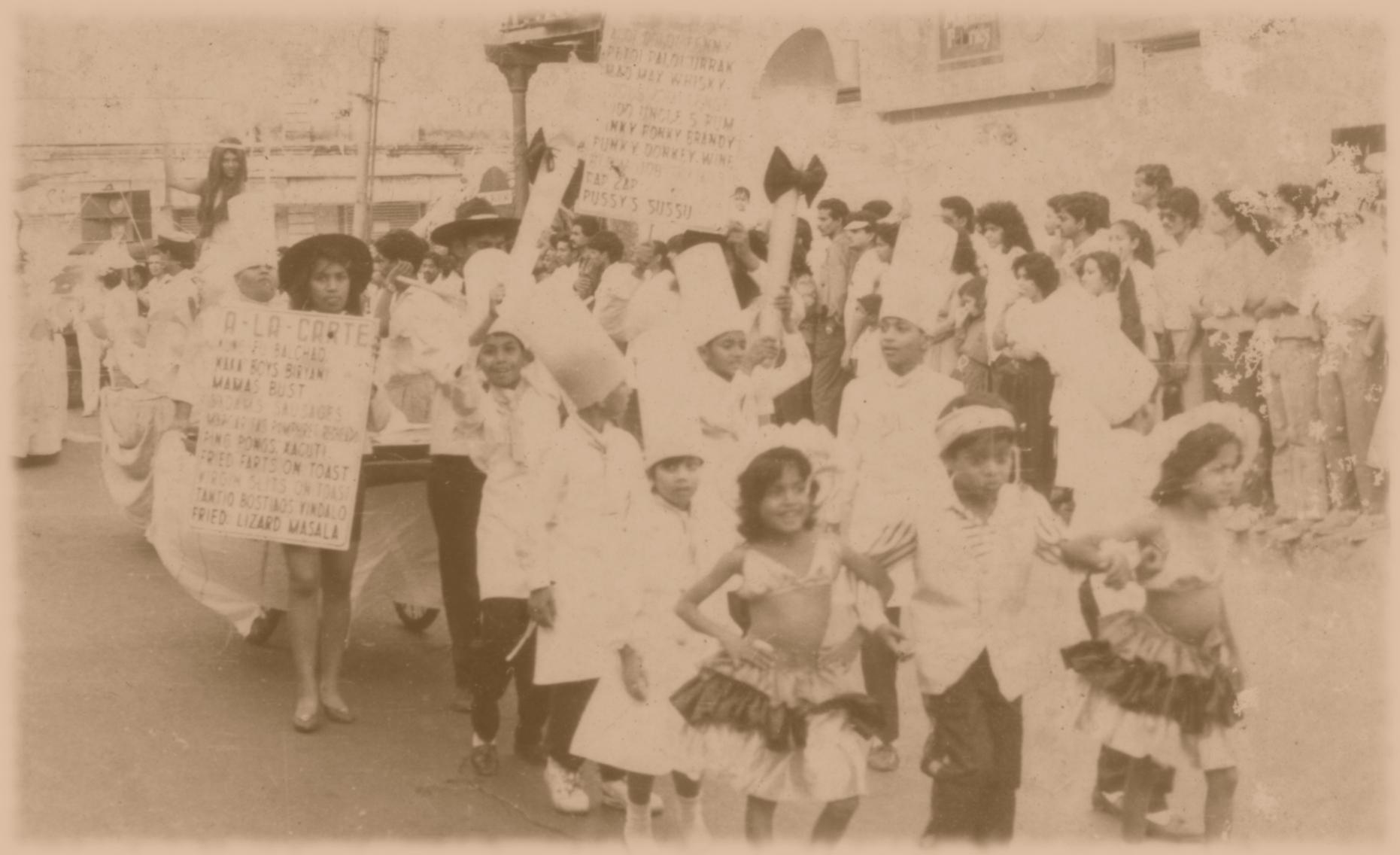
Panaji locals participating at the Goan Carnival, India, late 20th century

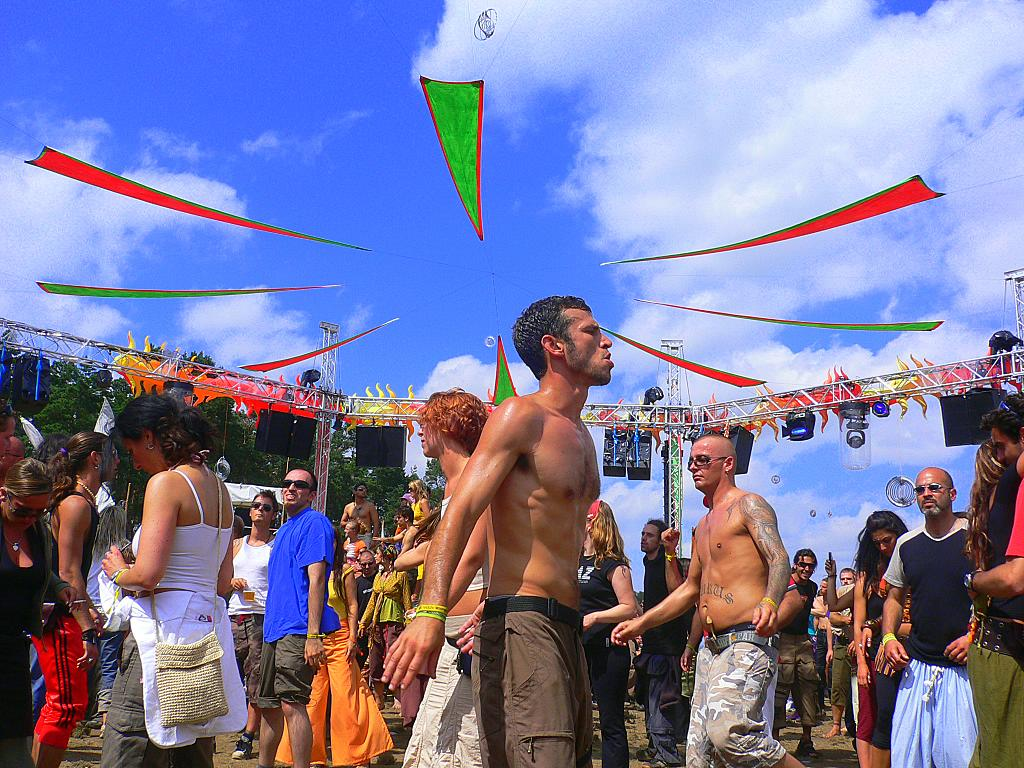
Foreign tourist revellers at the modern Goan Carnival, India, 2005

In India, Carnival is celebrated only in the state of Goa and was originally a local Roman Catholic tradition known as Intruz which means "swindler" in Konkani while Entrudo is the appropriate word in Portuguese for "Carnival". The present commercial version of the Goan carnival (King Momo, floats, etc.) was created based on the Rio Carnival only in the 1960s as a means of attracting tourism. The largest celebration takes place in the capital Panaji. The commercial Carnival festivities occur during the three days and nights preceding Ash Wednesday. Sixtus Eric Dias from Candolim was the King Momo for the Carnival 2021. All-night parades occur throughout the state with bands, dances, and floats. Grand balls are held in the evenings.

==== Indonesia ====
In Indonesia, the word "carnival" or karnaval is not related to pre-Lent festivities, but more to festivals in general, especially those with processions and extravagant costumes. One of the largest carnivals in Indonesia is the Solo Batik Carnival, held in Solo, Central Java. The Jember Fashion Carnaval is held in Jember, East Java.

The Roman Catholic community of Kupang, East Nusa Tenggara, held an Easter procession in form of an Easter Carnival called Pawai Paskah Kupang.

==== Philippines ====
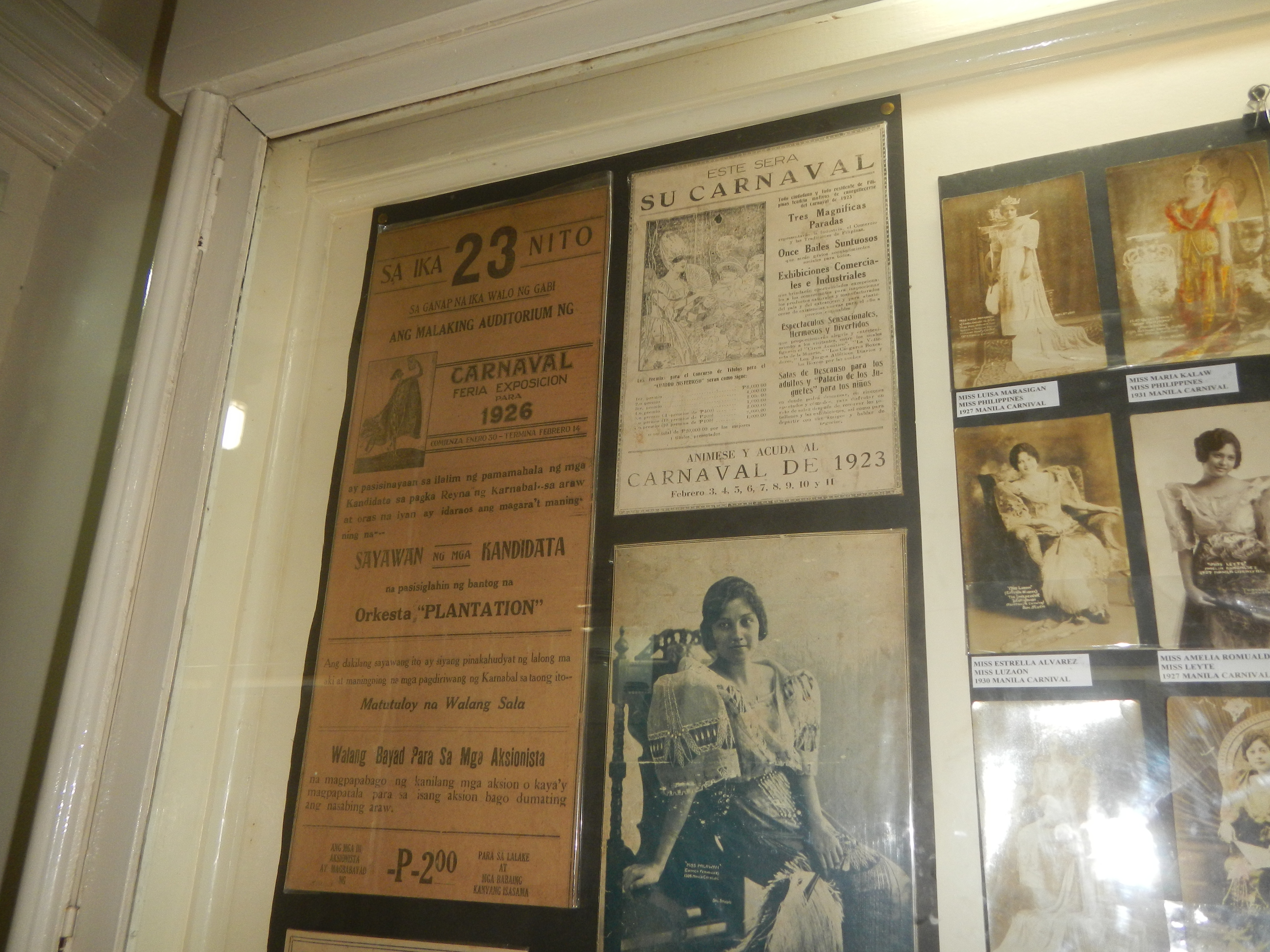
Posters and flyers of the Manila Carnival as well as photos of crowned Carnival Queens (c. 1920s-1930s), from the Escolta Museum

In the Philippines, the Manila Carnival (Philippine Spanish: Carnaval de Manila) was formerly a major annual event in Manila during the early American colonial period up to the time before the Second World War. It was organized by the American colonial administration to showcase the economic development of the Philippines. The highlight of the event is the crowning of the Carnival Queens, which is the precursor of later national pageants like Miss Philippines. It is also notable for founding and hosting the first Far Eastern Championship Games (then known as the "First Oriental Olympic Games") which became the precursor of the modern Asian Games.

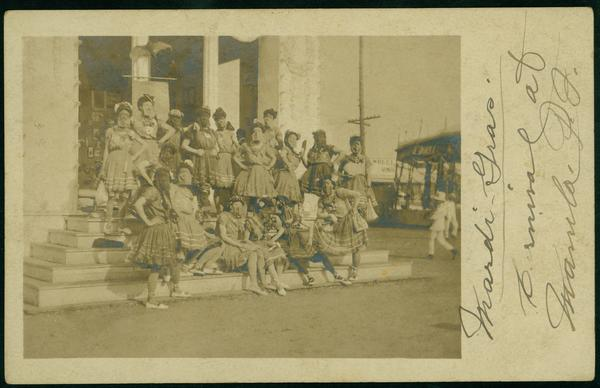
Postcard from the Manila Carnival (c. 1920s)

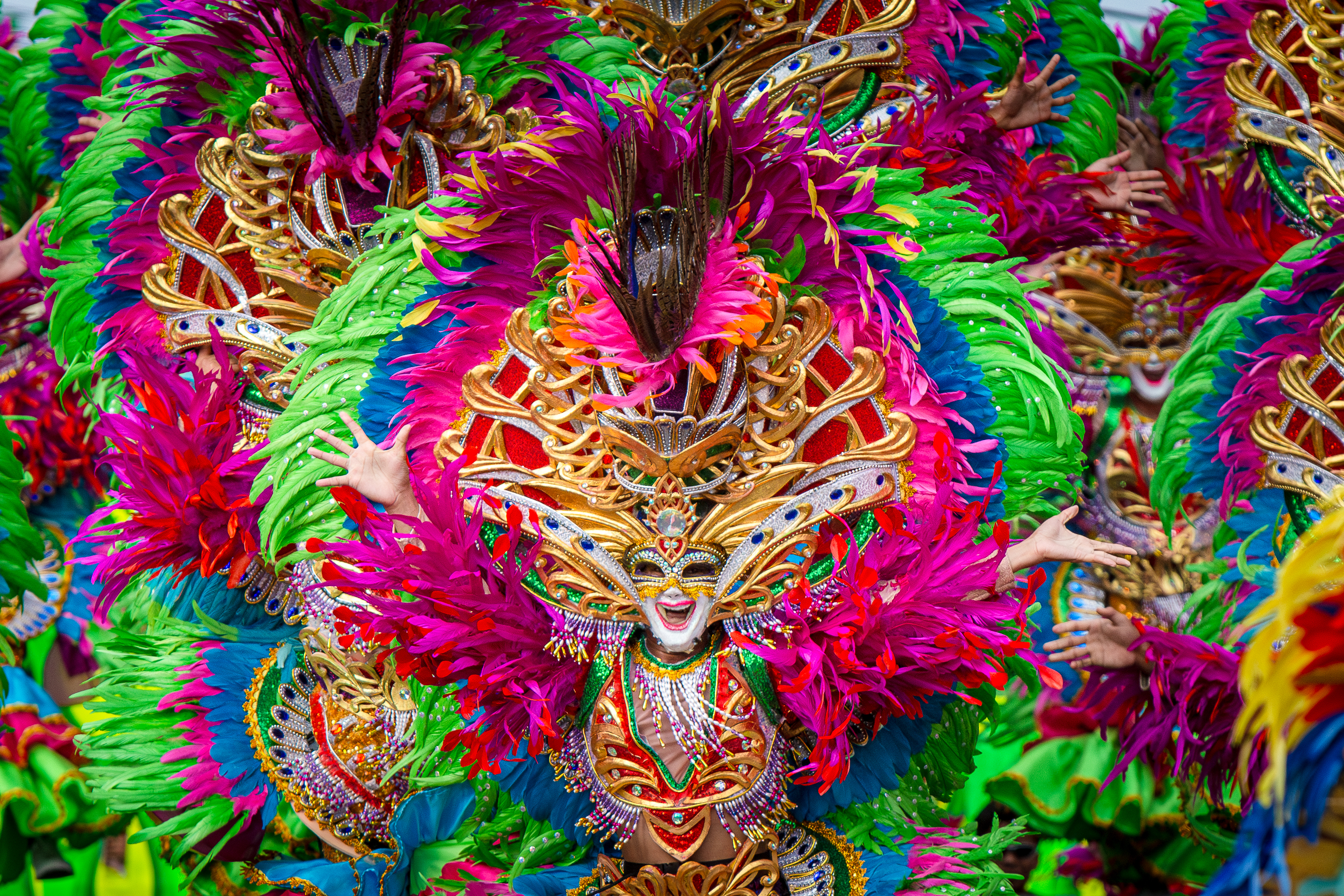
Parade contingents in the 2024 Masskara Festival of Bacolod, Philippines

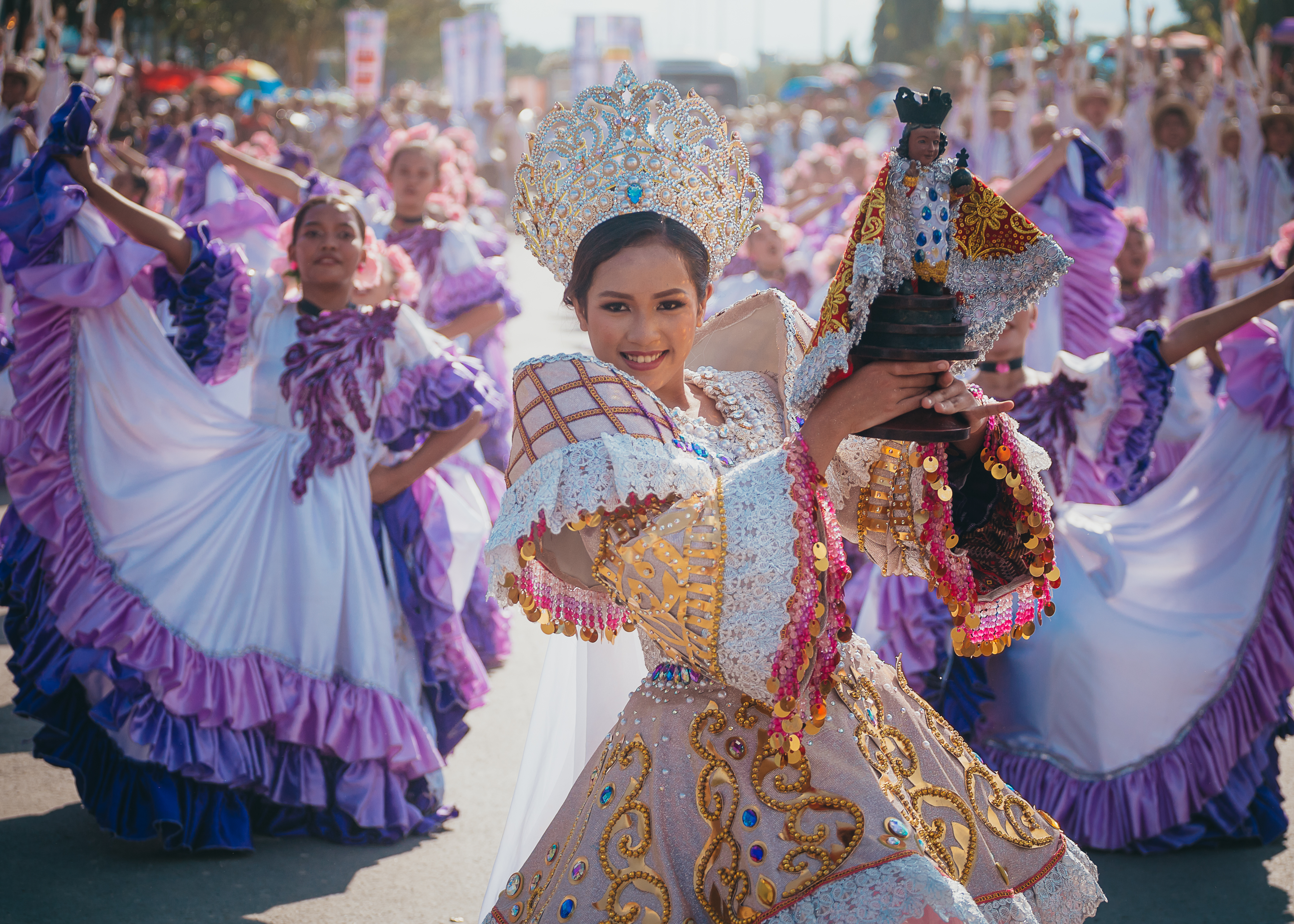
Parade contingents in the 2023 Sinulog Festival of Cebu, Philippines

The carnival lasted around two weeks in which a variety of shows were presented like circus, vaudeville, slapstick comedies, and theater. Five parades were also held, an opening parade, a military parade, a school parade, a business and industry parade (which included foreign participants), and the floral parade (which featured the Carnival Queen winner).

The carnival was first held in February 1908 and was initially only a city celebration. It expanded to a national scope by 1912, the year that it was held concurrently with the Philippine Exposition. It was discontinued in 1939, due to the outbreak of the Second World War. It was also not held during the Japanese occupation of the Philippines (1941 to 1944). After Philippine independence in 1946, it was never renewed.

In the modern Philippines, thousands of annual festivals and fiestas throughout the islands feature public celebrations and street parade competitions with elaborate costumes similar to the carnival. However, there are a few surviving pre-lent festivities among this huge list. In the municipality of Paoay, Ilocos Norte, they celebrate the Guling-Guling Festival Held on Shrove Tuesday, the townspeople believe that this is the last day to enjoy all forms of merrymaking before lent. Guling-Guling comes from the Ilocano word guling meaning "to mark, smear or make a sign". In the olden days, the alcalde (now mayor) of the town would imprint the sign of the cross on a person's forehead using w wet, shite rice flour symbolizing purity and through this marking, a person was cleansed of his past sins.

Paoayeños don their best traditional dress and then they cook a sweet rice cake called dudol, which is the main delicacy served during the festivity. They are then met by the mayor who applies the wet, white rice flour in a form of sign of the cross and locals believe that it is a sign of bad luck if they didn't have the guling. After the ritual, the people will then consume dudol and basi. A parade will continue to the church, the streets and the town plaza where the merrymaking reaches its peak. People dance traditional dances such as Sabunganay, Ariquen-quen, Amorosa, Binatbatan, and La Jota.

The Tagalog regions also host a few surviving carnival festivities tied to lent. According to El Folklore Filipino, Isabelo de los Reyes wrote that Tagalogs have a type of carnival celebration and usually held Sunday before Ash Wednesday they call de la paz where they eat a lot of meat and lechon. In the Pambansang Diksiyonaryo, lapas, from Spanish la paz, means celebrating for three days before Ash Wednesday. In the Spanish account Viajes por Filipinas: de Manila a Tayabas, it was recorded:

"Al aproximarse la cuaresma el indio de Tayabas se prepara á despedirse de comer carne, con las fiestas de lapasan, las que siempre se celebran en las sementeras. Si los que las dan son ricos, asiste la música; si no lo son, la guitarra, las voces y las palmas la sustituyen. En los aristocráticos lapasan, se bailan habaneras y rigodones, se cantan trozos de cualquier cosa, y se bebe vino de Europa en vaso: mientras que en los lapasan tradicionales, en los puros tagalos, se empina coquillo, se baila cumintang, se canta cutang-cutang, se bebe en tabo, se come lechón, y por todo mantel está el verde césped, por todo tenedor los cinco dedos, y por todo pan sendas pelotas de morisqueta."

"As Lent approaches, the Tayabas Indians prepares to bid farewell to eating meat with the lapasan celebrations, which are always held in the fields. If the hosts are wealthy, music is present; if not, guitars, voices, and clapping take its place. At the aristocratic lapasan, habaneras and rigodons are danced, snippets of any kind are sung, and European wine is drunk from glasses; while at the traditional, purely Tagalog lapasan, coquillo is sipped, cumintang is danced, cutang-cutang is sung, drinks are taken from tabo, suckling pig is eaten, and the green grass serves as a tablecloth, five fingers as a fork, and small balls of morisqueta bread as bread."

On the same account, it was noted that the natives celebrate the feast day of St. John the Baptist and the three days of carnival with water splashing and native boat races.

There's another Tagalog term for carnival celebrations and the feast day of San Juan. Checking the Vocabulario de la lengua Tagala by Juan de Noceda, the tagalog word for carnestolendas is Boling-Boling or Buling-Buling. Checking again the Pambansang Diksiyonaryo, Buling-Buling is defined as the act of throwing water at the feast day of Saint John the Baptist. Buling-Buling etymologically came from the Tagalog word buling meaning "tarnish, smut, smudge, or smear". In other Philippine languages like Cebuano and Hiligaynon, the word buling means dirt, soot or stain and are mostly used within the context of Ash Wednesday. In the town of Mogpog, Marinduque they have a ritual done on the eve of Ash Wednesday called Buling or Buling-Buling where they dance and sing for the parish priests before the ritual burning of blessed palms are done.

In the town of Catanauan, Quezon, they celebrate the Boling-Boling festival for three days before Ash Wednesday. People don elaborate costumes or any costume they prefer while some opt to dress as Karnabal, a clown character unique to this town. The Karnabals throw white powders to participants in the revelry. There are also who just cover themselves with mud and dried leaves or cover themselves with soot. It is said that this is done as a symbol that we all came from dust and from dust we return. There are also old women who dance with decorated hats and traditional dresses called Denoñas. They dance and sing from house to house in exchange of money to raise funds for their future church activities and festivities.

In the neighboring town of Guinayangan, Quezon, they also have a pre-lenten rites called Buling-Buling. Done either on the Shrove Tuesday or Ash Wednesday, groups of people, men and women, dance from house to house similar to Denoñas of Catanauan for raising funds. They perform the Buling-Buling folk dance.

In the parish of Santuario de San Antonio in Makati City, they also do the Buling-Buling festivities before Ash Wednesday, where they perform traditional folk dances, modern dances, and singing performances.

Buling-Buling is also celebrated in Lipa, Batangas. Celebrated Sunday before Ash Wednesday, participants perform a riotous water festival similar to the Wattah Wattah Festival of San Juan City. The festivity is currently gaining scrutiny due to riotous nature and water pranks done on people regardless if they conset to participate or not. This particular celebration is the one more faithful to the carnival celebrations recorded in Viajes por Filipinas: De Manila a Tayabas where it is celebrated with water like the feast day of St. John the Baptist.

The Buling-Buling carnivals are seem to be connected with the Buling-Buling festivities done on the day of San Juan. Traditionally, the Basaan revelry done on this day is called buling-buling. Some towns that has preserved this name for their fiesta for St. John the Baptist are the Basaan or Buling-Buling water revelry done on Balayan, Batangas, that also involves the famous parada ng lechon, and the Buling-Buling of Tiaong, Quezon, also involving water festivities.

Finally, it was recorded that the towns of Antipolo, Cardona and Teresa once celebrated or at least had an activity related to the pre-lent carnivals. Every carnival season, It was recorded that wives of the officers of the municipality with hats on their heads go around the town with a band of music after them. They dance without formality and the way they please. From time to time they visit houses of prominent men where they were being offered spirited drinks and gifts like certain amount of money to which they used for their entertainment or for the mass. The practice declined as the newer generation saw the practice as outdated.

=== Europe ===
==== Albania ====
Carnivals have begun to be celebrated in Korça before 1940, a period in which cultural life in this city has been varied. Although a pagan holiday, the Carnival was later celebrated on Feast Day in February. In addition to the many carnival-wearing individuals, there were bands with guitars, bows, and butaphoric masks such as animal heads and humans. The Korça Carnival took a big hit after the creation of cultural societies such as the "Korça Youth". During this period carnivals were accompanied by mandolins, guitars and humorous songs. Carnival celebrations were discontinued after 1960, to resume in other social conditions after 1990. Korça is one of the first cities to revive the Carnival tradition by establishing the Carnival Association in 1992 as part of the National Carnival Association of Albania. On 10 April 1994, the first International Carnival Festival in Albania was organized in Korça. The following year, the second International Carnival Festival is even larger. Since this year and until 2008, the Korca Carnival group has been represented at a number of international festivals organized in various European countries.

==== Belgium ====
Many parts of Belgium celebrate Carnival, typically with costume parades, partying and fireworks. These areas include the province of Limburg with its cities Maasmechelen, Maaseik and Lanaken along the river Meuse, the cities of Aalst, Ninove, Binche, Eupen, Halle, Heist, Kelmis, Malmedy, and Stavelot.

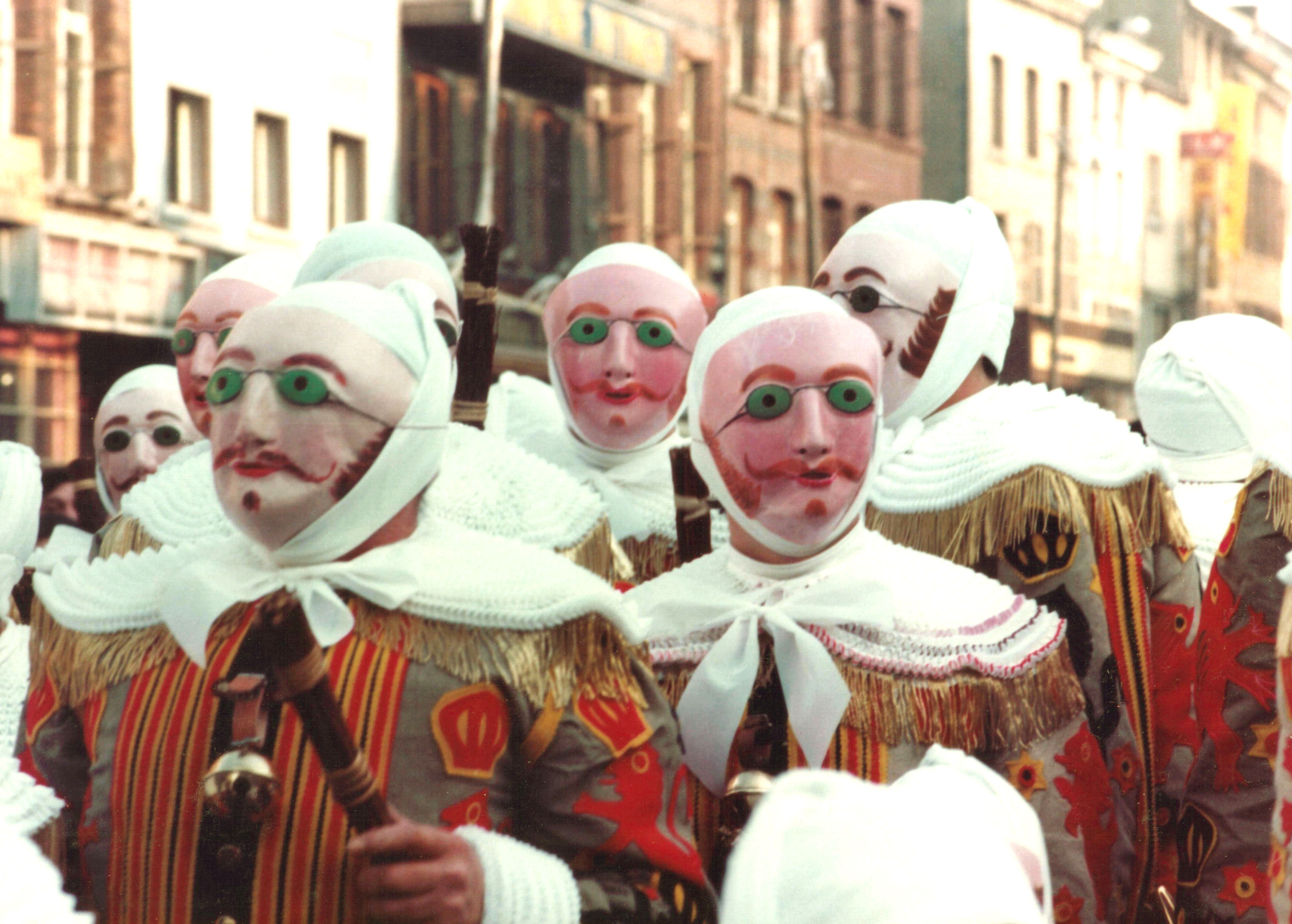
The Gilles at the Carnival of Binche, in Binche, Belgium

The Carnival of Binche dates at least to the 14th century. Parades are held over the three days before Lent; the most important participants are the Gilles, who wear traditional costumes on Shrove Tuesday and throw blood oranges to the crowd. In 2003, the Carnival of Binche was recognised as one of the Masterpieces of the Oral and Intangible Heritage of Humanity.

The Carnival of Aalst, celebrated during the three days preceding Ash Wednesday, received the same recognition in 2010.

Belgium's oldest parade is the Carnival Parade of Maaseik, also held on Laetare Sunday, which originated in 1865.

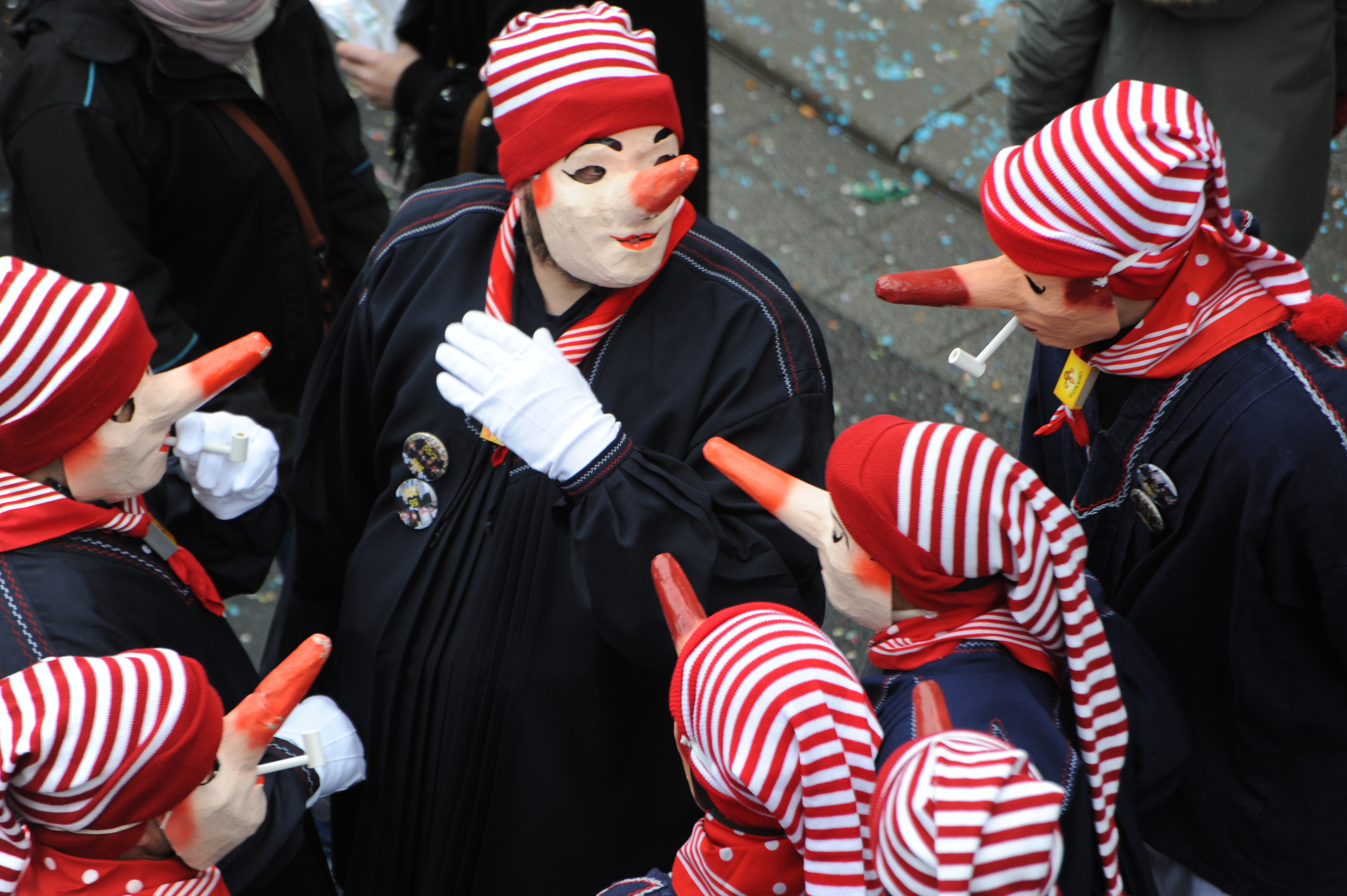
Long-Né and Longuès-Brèsses at the Carnival of Malmedy (Cwarmê), in Malmedy, Belgium

The Carnival of Malmedy is locally called Cwarmê. Even if Malmedy is located in the east Belgium, near the German-speaking area, the Cwarmê is a pure Walloon and Latin carnival. The celebration takes place during the four days before Shrove Tuesday. The Cwarmê Sunday is the most important and interesting to see. All the old traditional costumes parade in the street. The Cwarmê is a "street carnival" and is not only a parade. People who are disguised pass through the crowd and perform a part of the traditional costume they wear. The famous traditional costumes at the Cwarmê of Malmedy are the Haguète, the Longuès-Brèsses, and the Long-Né.

Some Belgian cities hold Carnivals during Lent. One of the best-known is Stavelot, where the Carnival de la Laetare takes place on Laetare Sunday, the fourth Sunday of Lent. The participants include the Blancs-Moussis, who dress in white, carry long red noses and parade through town attacking bystanders with confetti and dried pig bladders. The city of Halle also celebrates on Laetare Sunday.

==== Bosnia and Herzegovina ====
In Bosnia and Herzegovina, the Croat-majority city of Ljubuški holds a traditional Carnival (Bosnian: Karneval). Ljubuški is a member of the Federation of European Carnival Cities (FECC).

==== Croatia ====
The most famous Croatian Carnival (Croatian: karneval, also called maškare or fašnik) is the Rijeka Carnival, during which the mayor of Rijeka hands over the keys to the city to the Carnival master (meštar od karnevala). The festival includes several events, culminating on the final Sunday in a masked procession. (A similar procession for children takes place on the previous weekend.)

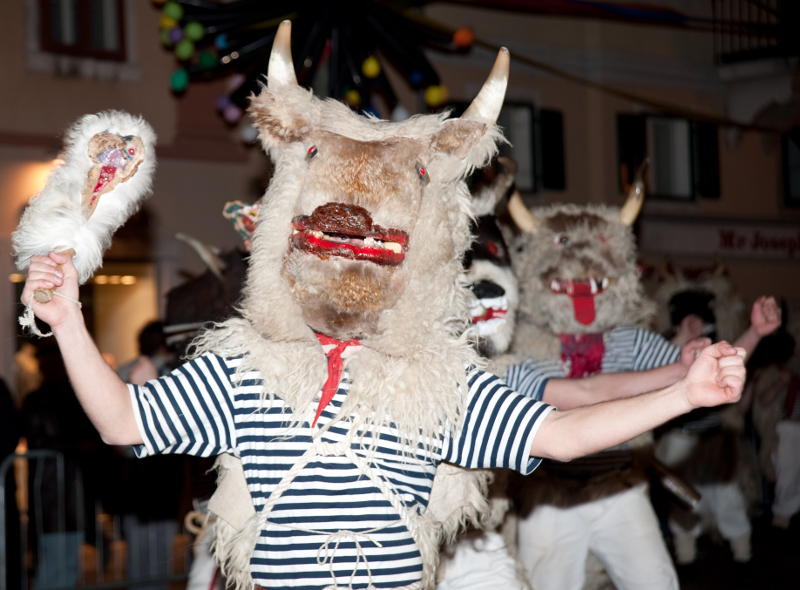
Halubajski zvončari at Rijeka Carnival, in Rijeka, Croatia

Many towns in Croatia's Kvarner region (and in other parts of the country, e.g. in Međimurje County in Northern Croatia) observe the Carnival period, incorporating local traditions and celebrating local culture. Some of the towns and places are Grobnik, Permani, Kastav and many others places near Rijeka, then Čakovec, Samobor etc. Just before the end of Carnival, every Kvarner town burns a man-like doll called a "Pust", who is blamed for all the strife of the previous year. The Zvončari, or bell-ringers push away winter and all the bad things in the past year and calling spring, they wear bells and large head regalia representing their areas of origin (for example, those from Halubje wear regalia in the shape of animal heads). The traditional Carnival food is fritule, a pastry. This festival can also be called Poklade.

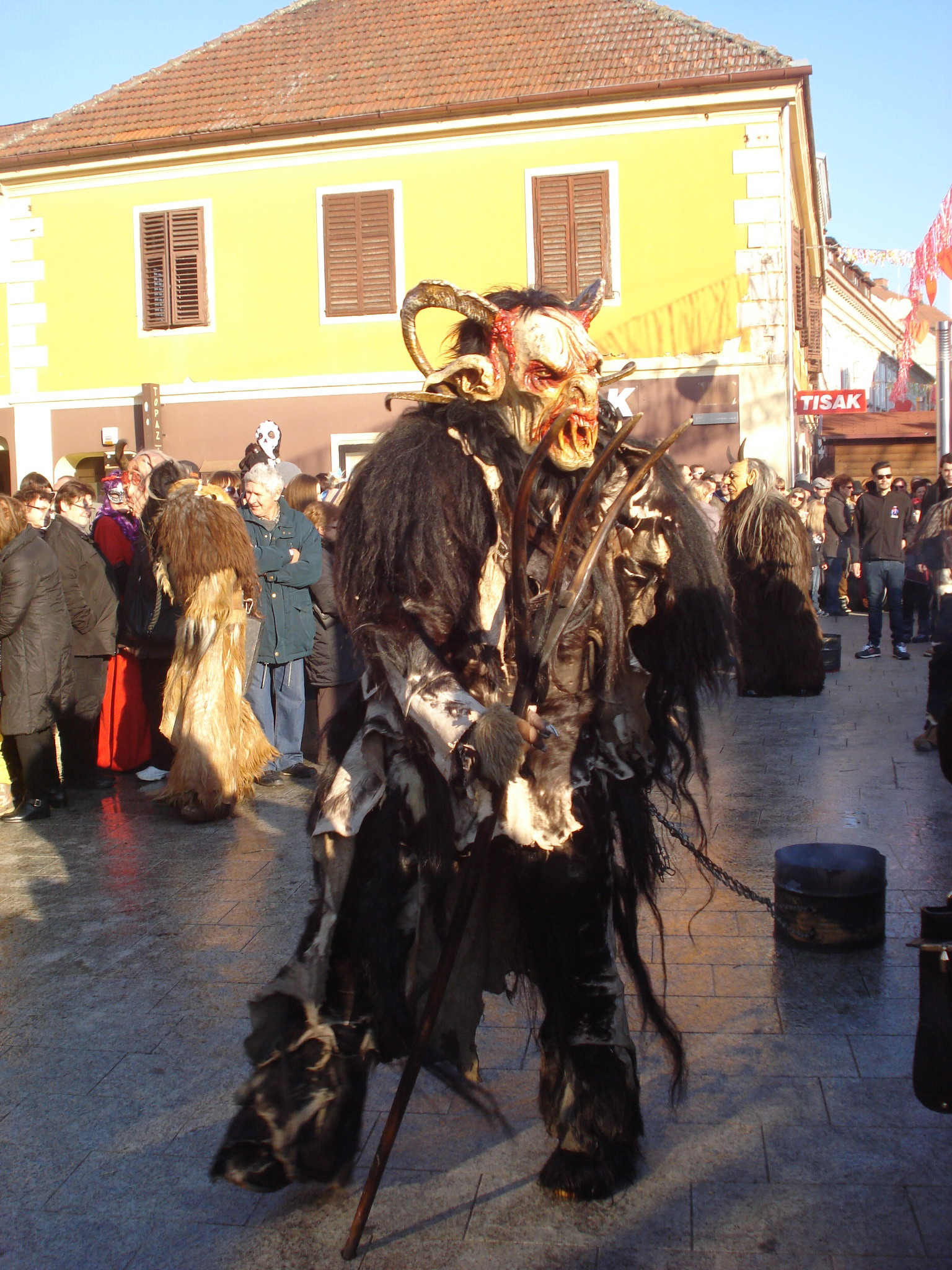
A Krampus from Međimurje County, northern Croatia

Masks are worn to many of the festivities, including concerts and parties. Children and teachers are commonly allowed to wear masks to school for a day, and also wear masks at school dances or while trick-or-treating. Carnivals also take place in summer. One of the most famous is the Senj Summer Carnival – first celebrated in 1968. The towns of Cres, Pag, Novi Vinodolski, and Fužine also organise Summer Carnivals.

==== Cyprus ====
Carnival has been celebrated in Cyprus for centuries. The tradition was likely established under Venetian rule around the 16th century. It may have been influenced by Greek traditions, such as festivities for deities such as Dionysus. The celebration originally involved dressing in costumes and holding masked balls or visiting friends. In the twentieth century, it became an organized event held during the 10 days preceding Lent (according to the Greek Orthodox calendar). The festival is celebrated almost exclusively in the city of Limassol.

Three main parades take place during Carnival. The first is held on the first day, during which the "Carnival King" (either a person in costume or an effigy) rides through the city on his carriage. The second is held on the first Sunday of the festival, and the participants are mainly children. The third and largest takes place on the last day of Carnival and involves hundreds of people walking in costume along the town's longest avenue. The latter two parades are open to anyone who wishes to participate.

==== Czech Republic ====
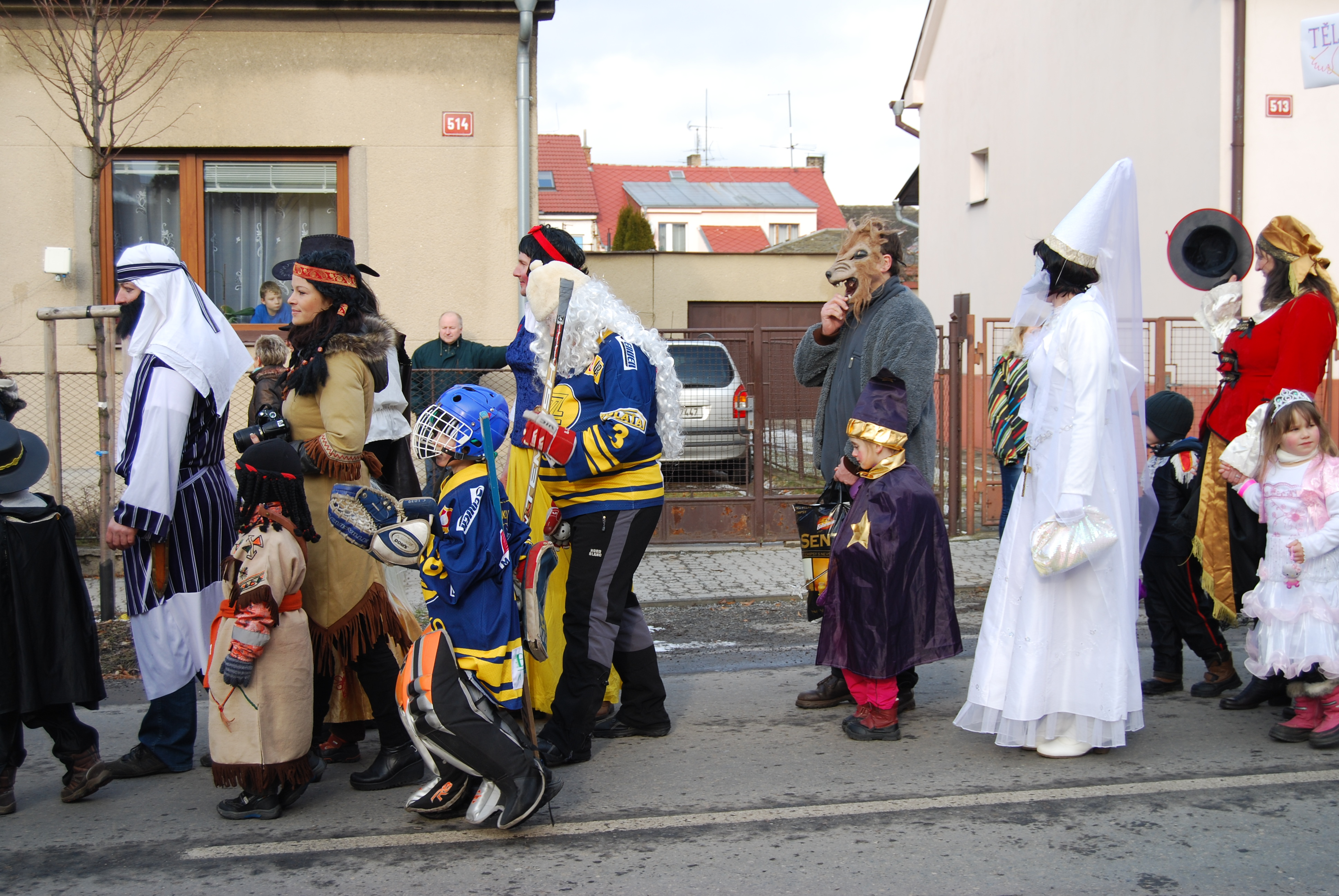
Masopust masks in Milevsko, Czech Republic

In the Czech Republic, the Masopust Festival takes place from Epiphany (Den tří králů) through Ash Wednesday (Popeleční středa). The word masopust translates literally from old Czech to mean "meat fast", and the festival often includes a pork feast. The tradition is most common in Moravia but also occurs in Bohemia. While practices vary, masks and costumes are present everywhere.

==== Denmark ====
Carnival in Denmark is called Fastelavn, and is held on the Sunday or Monday before Ash Wednesday. The holiday is sometimes described as a Nordic Halloween, with children dressing in costume and gathering treats for the Fastelavn feast. One popular custom is the fastelavnsris, a switch that children use to flog their parents to wake them up on Fastelavns Sunday.

==== Norway ====
In Norway, students having seen celebrations in Paris introduced Carnival processions, masked balls, and Carnival balls to Christiana in the 1840s and 1850s. From 1863, the artist federation Kunstnerforeningen held annual Carnival balls in the old Freemasons lodge, which inspired Johan Svendsen's compositions Norsk Kunstnerkarneval and Karneval in Paris. The following year, Svendsen's Festpolonaise was written for the opening procession. Edvard Grieg attended and wrote "Aus dem Karneval" (Folkelivsbilleder Op. 19). Since 1988, the student organization Tårnseilerne has produced annual masquerade balls in Oslo, with masks, costumes, and processions after attending an opera performance. The Carnival season also includes Fastelavens søndag (with cream buns) and fastelavensris with decorated branches.

==== Finland ====
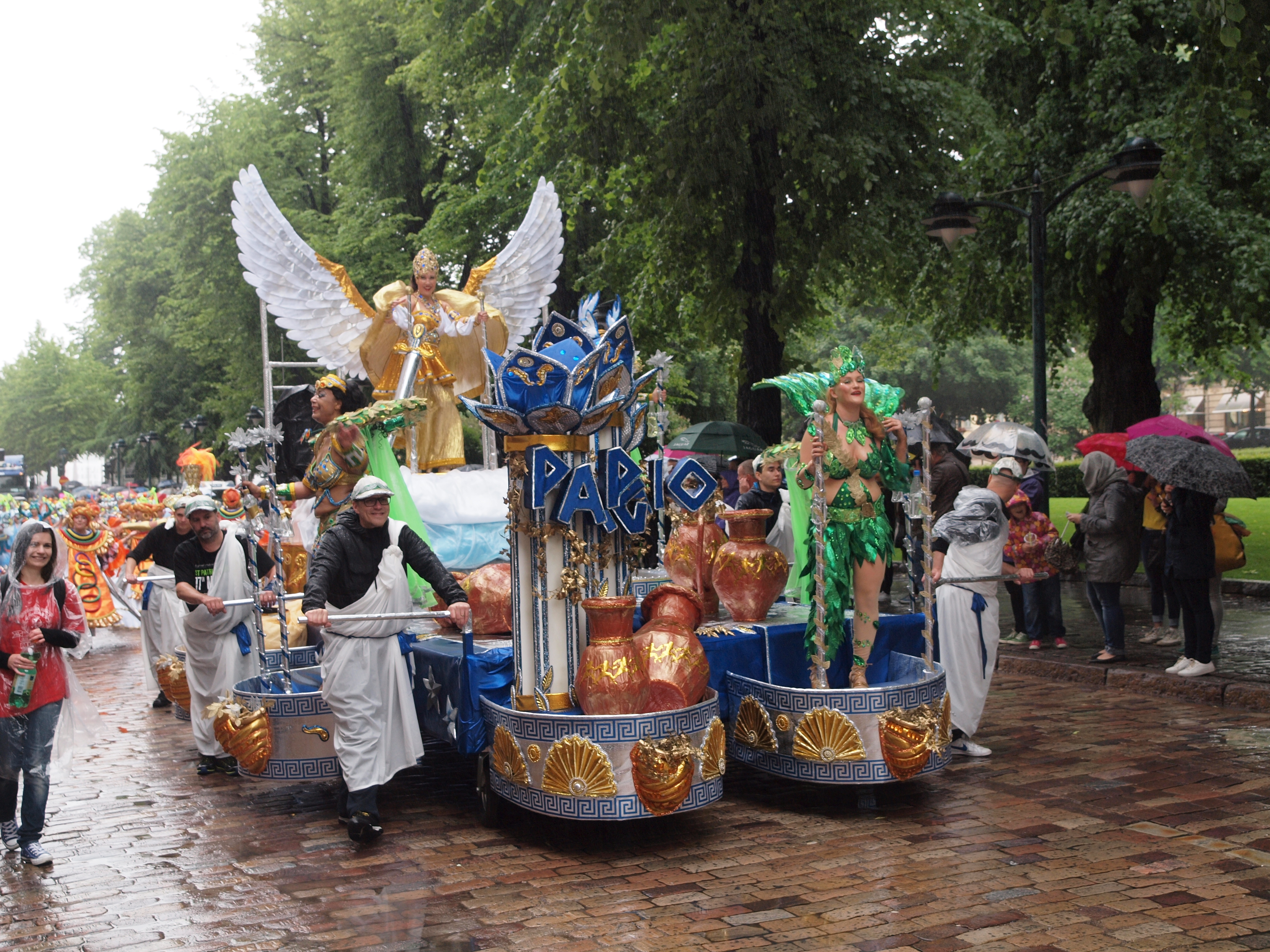
The 2016 Helsinki Samba Carnaval in Helsinki, Finland

The Helsinki Samba Carnaval, modelled after the samba carnivals in Brazil, takes place every year in middle June. The carnival lacks a proper historical tradition and has instead mostly grown from experimenting.

==== France ====
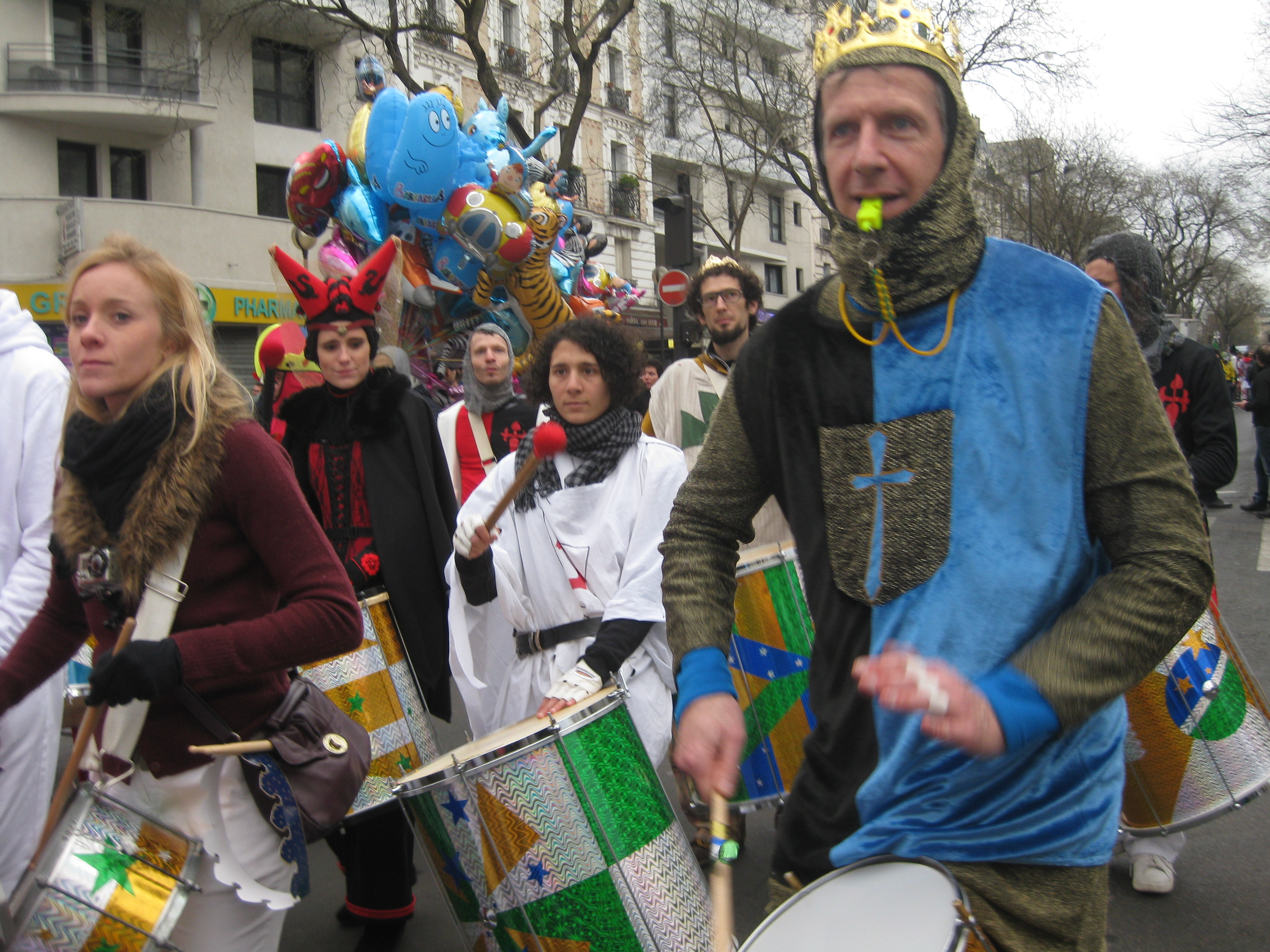
Carnival in Paris, France

Some major Carnivals of mainland France are the Nice Carnival, the Dunkirk Carnival and the Limoux Carnival. The Nice Carnival was held as far back as 1294, and annually attracts over a million visitors during the two weeks preceding Lent.

Since 1604, a characteristic masked Carnival is celebrated in Limoux.

The Dunkirk Carnival is among the greatest and most exuberant carnivals celebrated in Europe. Its traditions date back to the 17th century and are based on the vischerbende as fishermen went from one café to another accompanied by their relatives and friends just before departing to Icelandic fishing grounds.

In the French West Indies, it occurs between the Sunday of Epiphany and Ash Wednesday; this dates back to the arrival of French colonists in the islands.

==== Germany and Austria ====
===== Germany =====
The earliest written record of Carnival in Germany was in 1296 in Speyer. The first worldwide Carnival parade took place in Cologne in 1823. The most active Carnival week begins on the Thursday before Ash Wednesday, with parades during the weekend, and finishes the night before Ash Wednesday, with the main festivities occurring around Rosenmontag (Rose Monday). This time is also called the "Fifth Season". Shrove Tuesday, called Fastnacht or Veilchendienstag, is celebrated in some cities.

Parties feature self-made and more fanciful costumes and occasional masks. The parties become more exuberant as the weeks progress and peak after New Year, in January and February. The final Tuesday features all-night parties, dancing, hugging, and smooching. Some parties are for all, some for women only and some for children. Fasnachtsküchle (similar to Kreppel or donuts) are the traditional Fasching food and are baked or fried.

In Germany, Rheinischer Karnival and Schwäbische Fastnacht are distinct; first is less formal and more political, second is much more traditional.

===== "Rhenish Carnival" (Rheinischer Karneval, Fasnacht, Fasnet, Fastabend, Fastelovend, Fasteleer, Fasching) =====
The "Rheinische" Carnival is held in the west of Germany, mainly in the states of North Rhine-Westphalia and Rhineland-Palatinate, but also in Hesse (including Upper Hesse). Similar forms of the festival occur in Bavaria, and other states. Some cities are more famous for celebrations such as parades and costume balls. The Cologne Carnival, as well as those in Mainz, Eschweiler and Düsseldorf, are the largest and most famous. Other cities have their own, often less well-known celebrations, parades, and parties, such as Aachen, Bonn, Worms am Rhein, Speyer, Kaiserslautern, Frankfurt, Darmstadt, Duisburg, Dortmund, Essen, Mannheim, Münster, Krefeld, Ludwigshafen, Mönchengladbach, Stuttgart, Augsburg, Munich, and Nuremberg. The biggest German carnival club is located in the relatively small town of Dieburg in South Hesse. Festivities start as early as 11 November at 11:11am for some carnival organizations, but the main events usually take place after the Christmas season. On Carnival Thursday (called "Old Women Day" or "The Women's Day" in commemoration of an 1824 revolt by washer-women), women storm city halls, cut men's ties, and are allowed to kiss any passing man. Special acrobatic show dances in mock uniforms are a traditional contribution to most festive balls. They may or may not have been a source of inspiration to American cheerleading. The Fasching parades and floats make fun of individual politicians and other public figures. Many speeches do the same.

Traditions often also include the "Faschingssitzung" – a sit-only party with dancing and singing presentations, and often many speeches given that humorously criticize politics.

===== "Swabian-Alemannic" Carnival (Schwäbische Fastnacht) =====
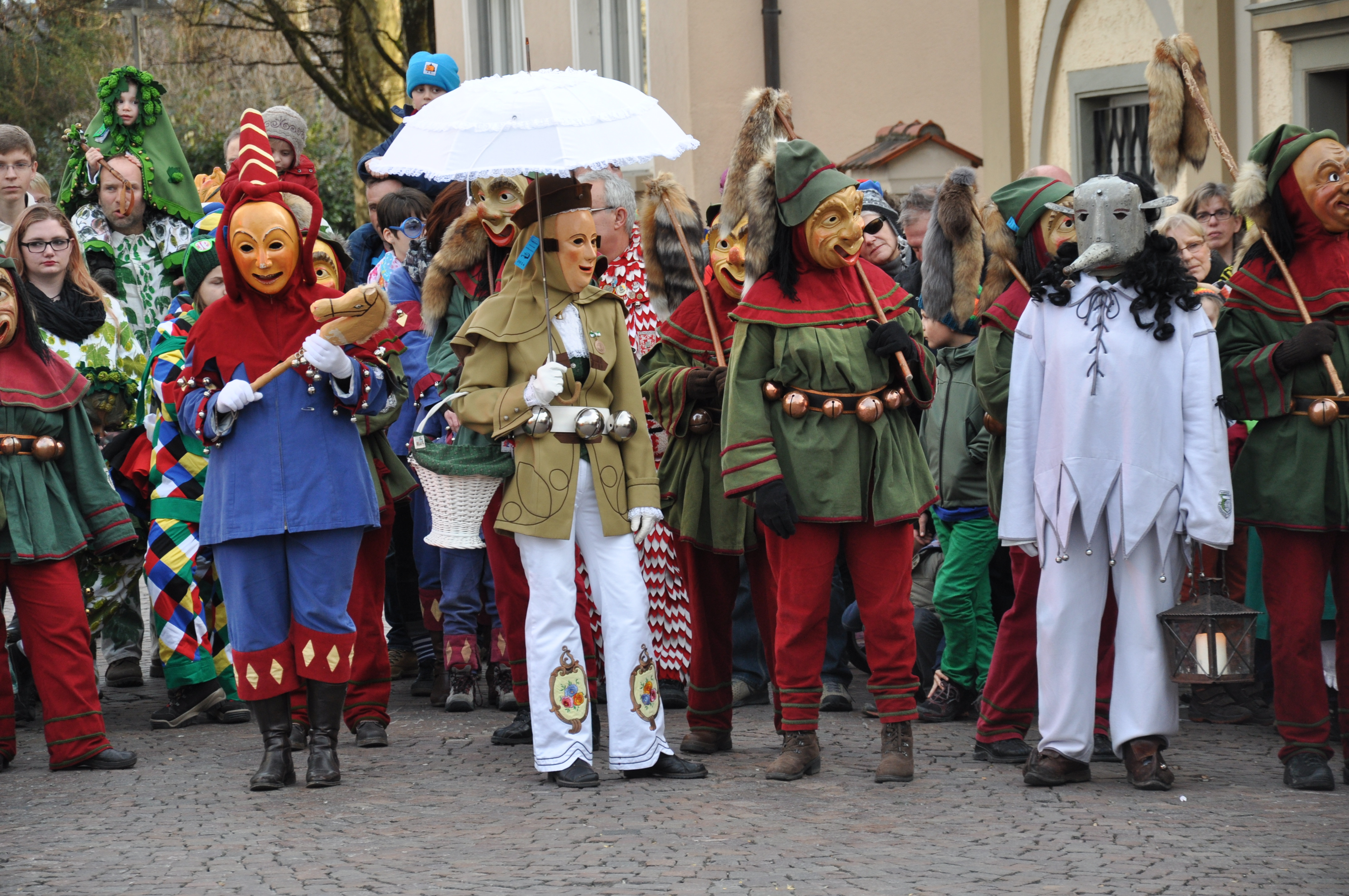
Reitenderle, der Grundholde, Hudelmale, Schnarragagges; popular Fasnet characters from Kisslegg im Allgäu, Swabia, Germany

The Swabian-Alemannic Fastnacht, known as Schwäbische Fastnacht, takes place in Baden, Swabia, the Allgäu, Alsace, and Vorarlberg (western Austria). During the pagan era, it represented the time of year when the reign of the grim winter spirits is over, and these spirits are hunted and expelled. It then adapted to Catholicism. The first official record of Karneval, Fasching or Fastnacht in Germany dates to 1296. Often the costumes and masks on parades strictly follow traditional designs and represent specific historical characters, public figures – or specific daemons.

==== Switzerland ====
===== Swiss Fasnacht =====
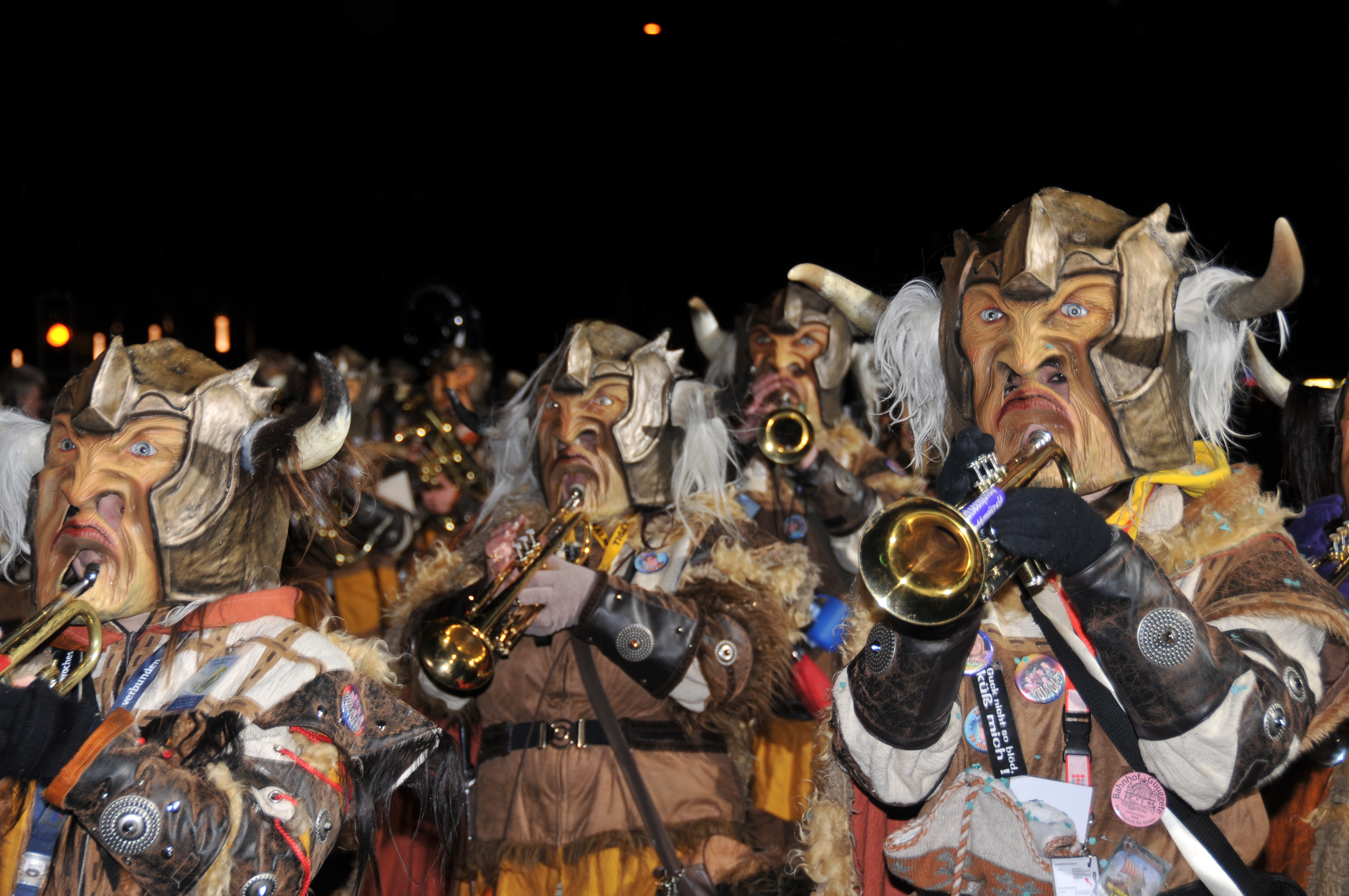
Monstercorso on Güdisdienstag's evening in Lucerne, Switzerland

In Switzerland, Fasnacht takes place in the Catholic cantons of Switzerland, e.g. in Lucerne (Lozärner Fasnacht), but also in Protestant Basel. However, the Basler Fasnacht begins on the Monday after Ash Wednesday. Both began in the Late Middle Ages. Smaller Fasnacht festivities take place across German Switzerland, e.g. in Bern and Olten, or in the eastern part (Zürich, St. Gallen, Appenzell).

==== Greece ====
In Greece, Carnival is known as Apókries (Απόκριες, lit. '[goodbye] to meat'), and officially begins with the "Opening of the Triodion", the liturgical book used by the Orthodox Church from then until Holy Week. Apokries is made up of three themed weeks of celebration known as Prophoní (Προφωνή, 'preannouncement week'), Kreatiní (Κρεατινή, 'meat week'), and Tiriní (Τυρινή, 'cheese week'). One of the season's high points during Kreatini is Tsiknopémpti (lit. 'Smoky-Thursday'), when celebrants throw large outdoor parties and roast huge amounts of meat; the ritual is repeated the following Sunday, after which point meat is forbidden until Easter. The following week, Tirini, is marked by similar festivities revolving around the consumption of cheese, eggs, and dairy and culminates with a "Cheese Sunday". Great Lent, and its restrictive fasting rules, begins in earnest the next day on Clean Monday. Throughout the Carnival season, festivals, parades, and balls are held all over the country. Many people disguise themselves as maskarádes ("masqueraders") and engage in pranks and revelry throughout the season.

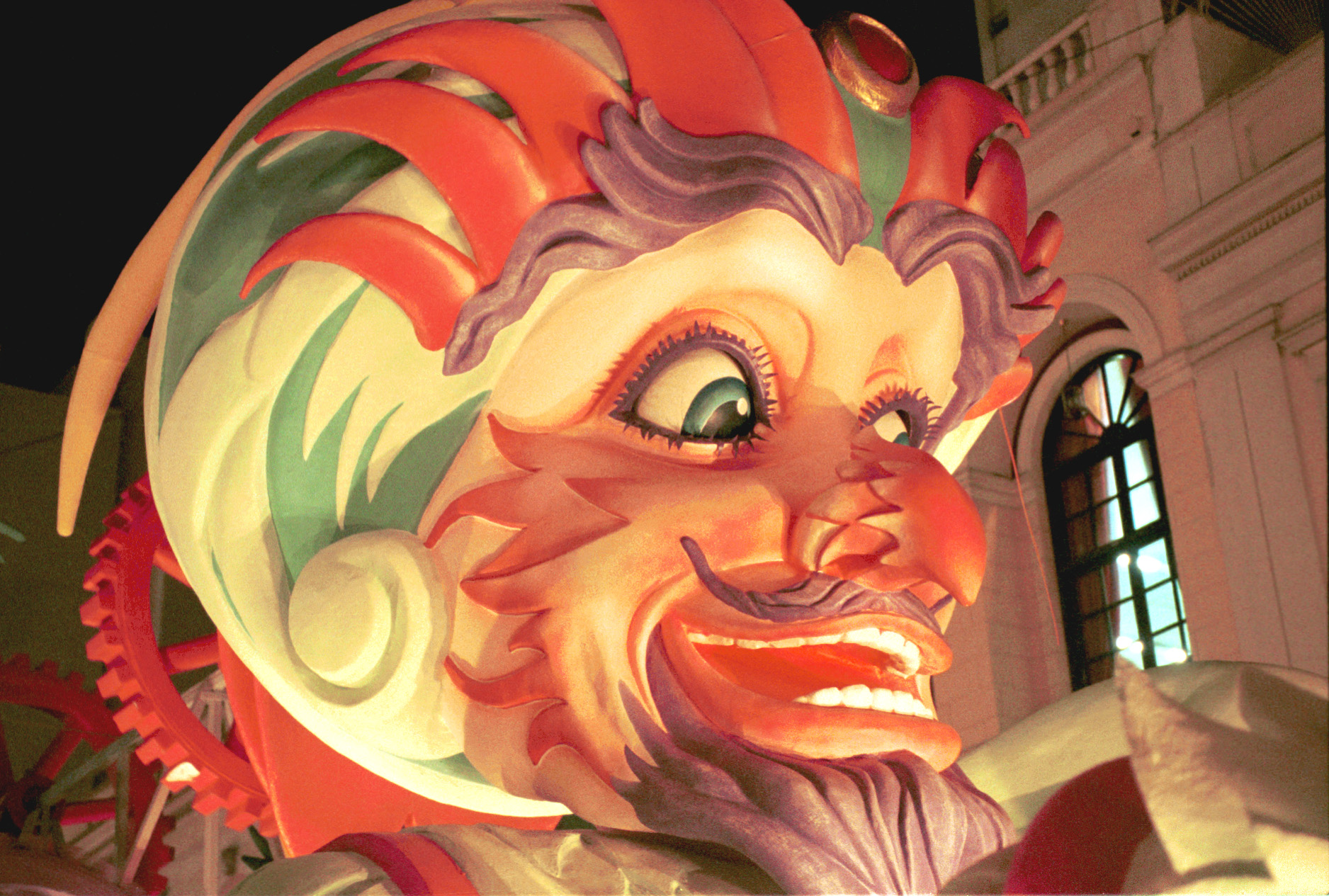
The float of the King Carnival parading in Patras, Greece

Patras holds the largest annual Carnival in Greece, and one of the largest in the world. The famous Patras Carnival is a three-day spectacle replete with concerts, theatre performances, parading troupes, an elaborate treasure hunt game, three major parades, parallel celebrations specifically for children, and many masquerade balls including the famous Bourboúlia (Μπουρμπούλια) ball in which women wear special robe-like costumes called a dómino to hide their identy. The festivities come to a crescendo on "Cheese Sunday" when The Grand Parade of troupes and floats leads celebrators to the harbor for the ceremonial burning of the effigy of King Carnival.

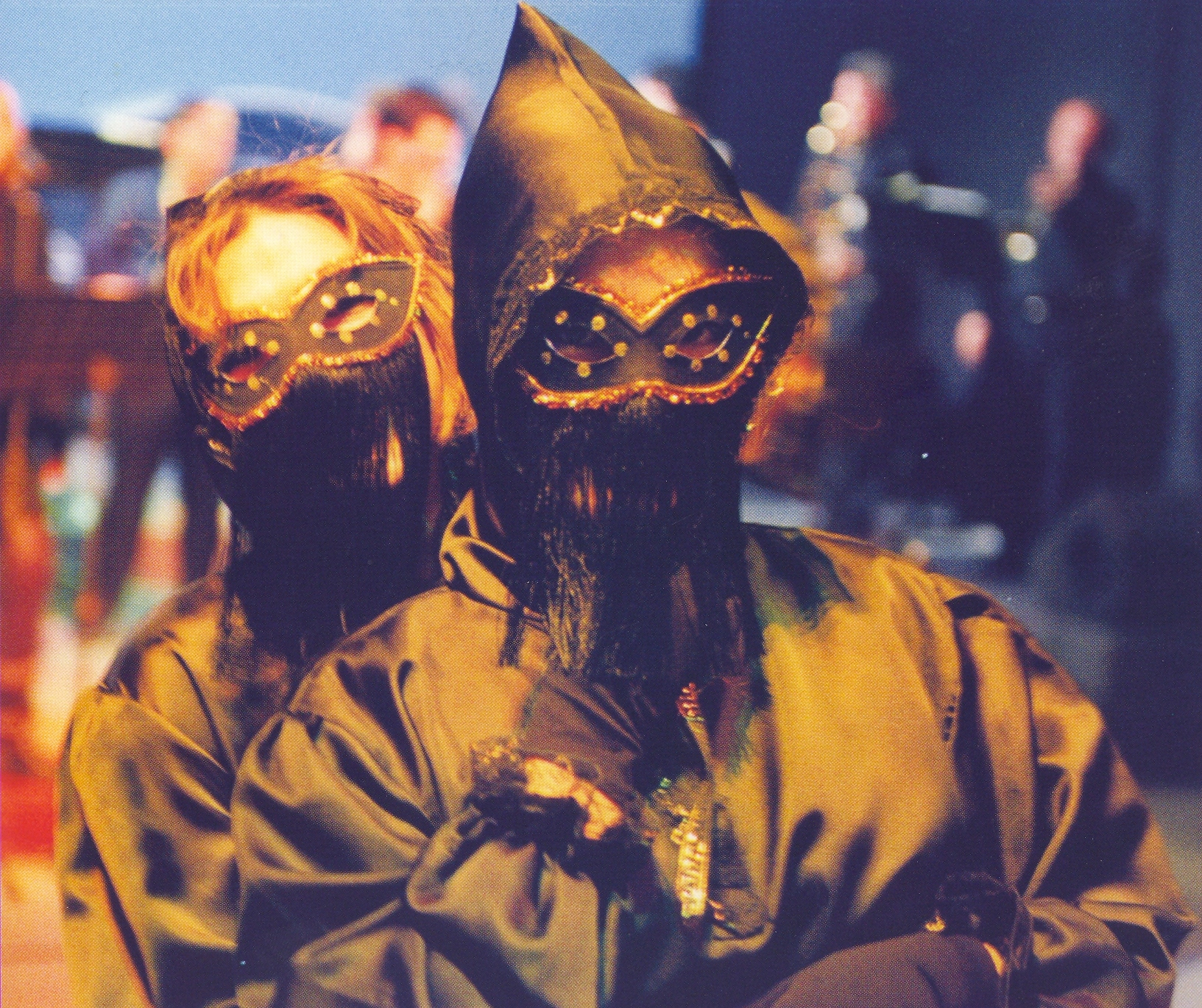
Ladies on their way to the historic Bourboulia ball in Patras, Greece, wearing the dómino costumes unique to that ball

The Carnival in Corfu is much influenced by the Carnival of Venice. During this period, various theatrical sketches are presented on the island, called Petególia or Petegolétsa (Πετεγολέτσα) in the local dialect. In previous centuries, existed also the custom of "Giostra" (jousting).

The second biggest Carnival in Greece takes place in Xanthi (Eastern Macedonia and Thrace) since 1966 and it is the major event of its kind in Northern Greece. The Xanthi Carnival manages to attract visitors from the nearby countries such as Bulgaria, Turkey, and Romania. Other regions host festivities of smaller extent, focused on the reenactment of traditional carnival customs, such as Tyrnavos (Thessaly), Kozani (Western Macedonia), Rethymno (Crete). Tyrnavos holds an annual Phallus festival, a traditional "phallkloric" event in which giant, gaudily painted effigies of phalluses made of papier-mâché are paraded, and which women are asked to touch or kiss. Their reward for so doing is a shot of the famous local tsipouro alcohol spirit.

Every year, from the 1st to the 8th of January, mostly in regions of Western Macedonia, traditional Carnival festivals erupt. Best known of these is the Ragoutsária (Ραγκουτσάρια) festival in the city of Kastoria whose celebration may date back to antiquity and whose name derives from the Latin word rogatores 'beggars', in reference to the beggars who could mingle with the rich in their masks. It takes place from 6–8 January with mass participation and is noted for its brass bands, flutes, and Macedonian drums. It is an ancient celebration of nature's rebirth akin to ancient festivals for Dionysus (Dionysia) and Kronos (Saturnalia).

==== Hungary ====
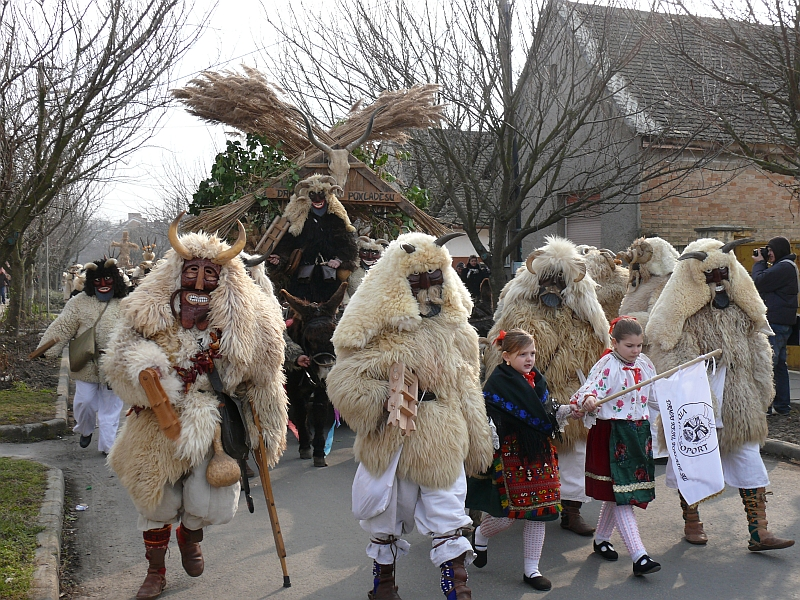
The Busójárás in Mohács, Hungary

Carnival season called "Farsang" in Hungarian happens between Epiphany (January 6) and Shrove Tuesday and is the time when costume parties traditionally take place, primarily for children (similar to Halloween).

In Mohács, Hungary, the Busójárás is a celebration held at the end of the Carnival season. It involves locals dressing in woolly costumes, with scary masks and noise-makers. According to legend, the festival celebrates both the conclusion of the winter season and a victory by the local people over invading Ottomans in 1526.

==== Italy ====
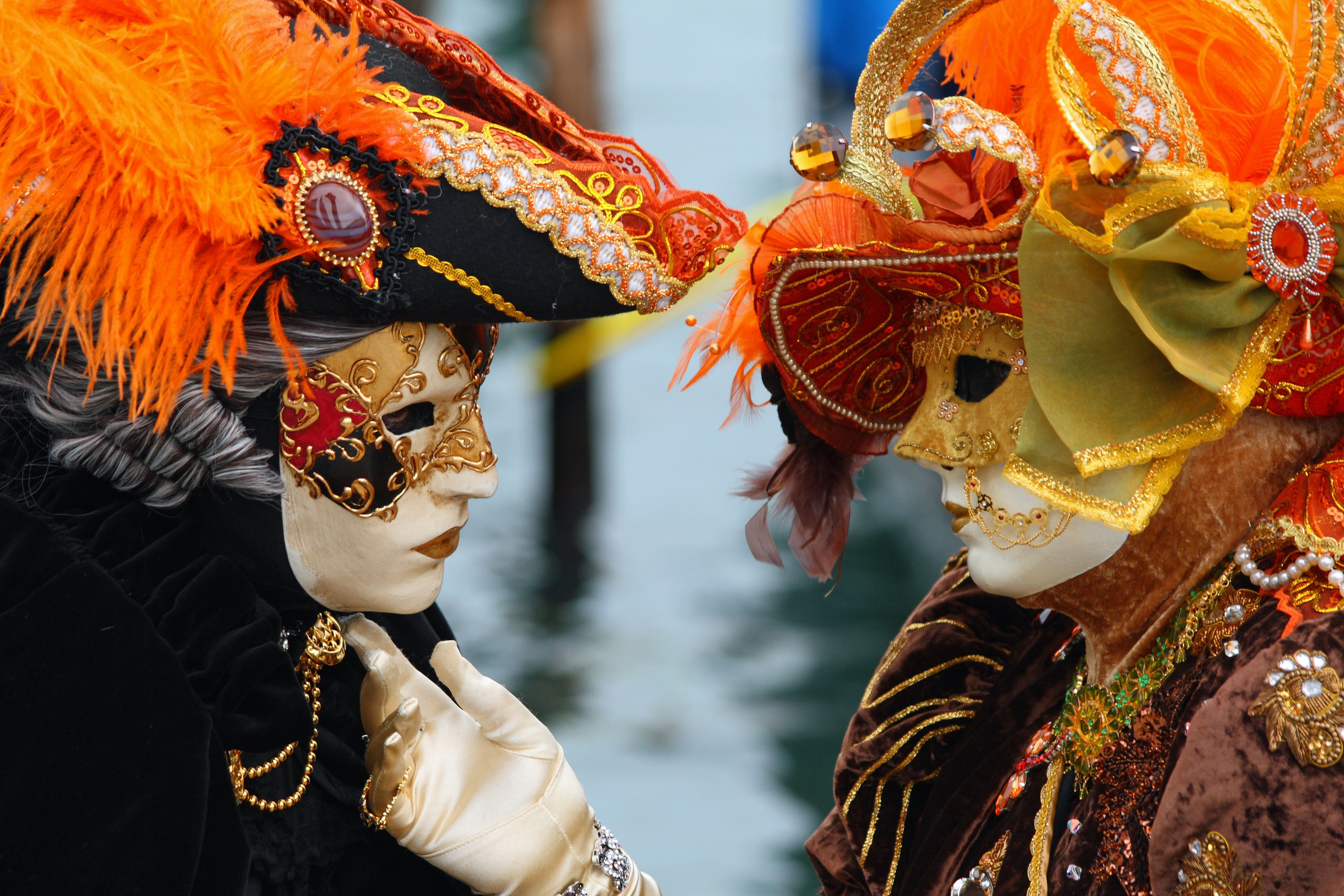
Distinctive Venetian masks at the Carnival of Venice

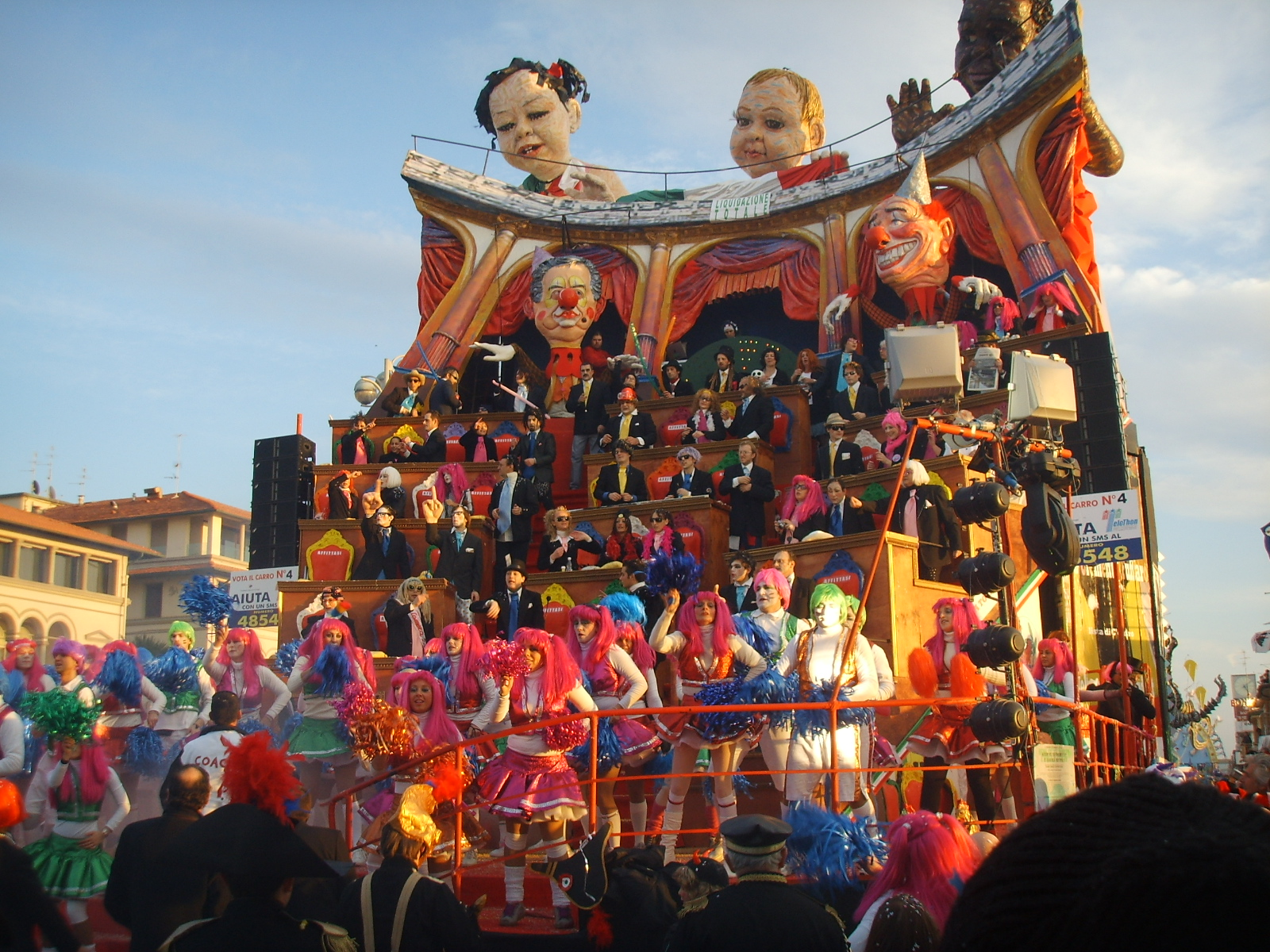
Carnival of Viareggio 2011, Uer iz de parti?

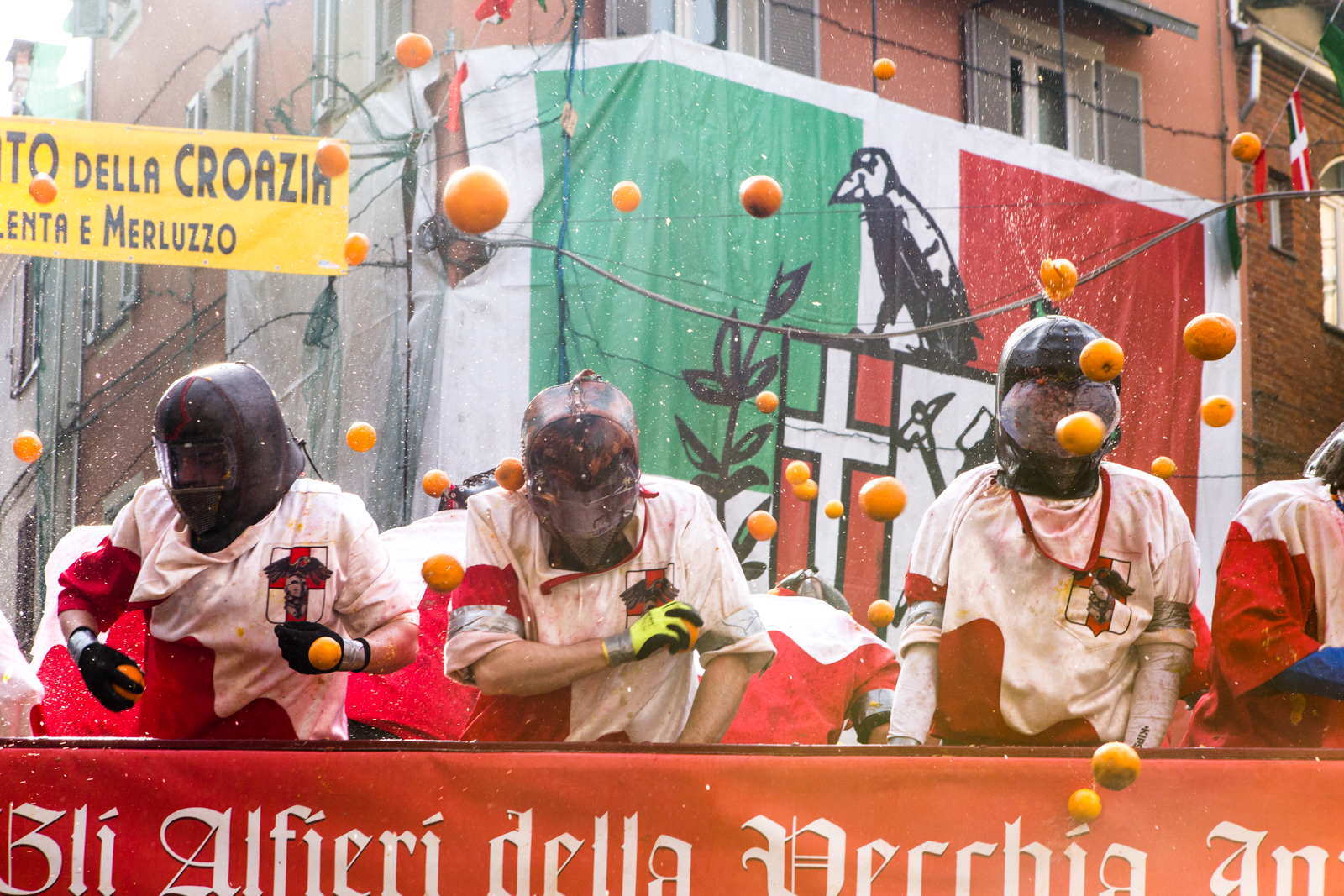
The Battle of the Oranges at the Carnival of Ivrea, in Ivrea, Italy

Carnival in Italy is a farewell party to eat, drink, and have fun before the limitations and solemnity of Lent. About a month before Ash Wednesday, Italians celebrate over many weekends with parades, masks, and confetti. The origins of this event may be traced to ancient Greece and Rome, when they worshipped Bacchus and Saturn. Some think they date back to archaic winter-to-spring ceremonies. Despite its pagan origins, the event was so extensively celebrated and the tradition so powerful that it was swiftly altered to fit into Catholic rituals. Carnival in Italy is traditionally celebrated on Fat Tuesday, but the weekend prior features activities as well.

Carnival traditions vary across Italy. In the Ambrosian rite regions around Milan, Carnival ends on the first Sunday of Lent. The Carnival of Venice and Carnival of Viareggio are particularly renowned, featuring sophisticated masquerades and parades. In Sardinia, a distinct carnival form survives, possibly rooted in pre-Christian winter rituals of awakening the earth. These Carnivals include masquerades and parades.

The Carnival in Venice was first documented in 1296, with a proclamation by the Venetian Senate announcing a public festival the day before the start of Lent. Its subversive nature is reflected in Italy's many laws over the centuries attempting to restrict celebrations and the wearing of masks. Carnival celebrations in Venice were halted after the city fell under Austrian control in 1798, but were revived in the late 20th century.

The Carnival of Viareggio is the second-most popular in Italy. It lasts a month with night and day celebrations, floats, parades, district celebrations, masked dances, and other shows. The first masquerade took place in 1873, in response to the upper classes' dissatisfaction with having to pay hefty taxes. Thousands of travelers go to Italy for parades, Carnival masks and costumes, concerts, and music.In 2001, the town built a new "Carnival citadel" dedicated to Carnival preparations and entertainment.

The Carnival of Ivrea is famous for its "Battle of the Oranges" fought with fruit between the people on foot and the troops of the tyrant on carts, to remember the wars of the Middle Ages, allegory of struggle for freedom. It is considered one of the most ancient Carnivals in the world. The fight commemorates Ivrea's rebellion against tyrannical rule in the Middle Ages. The miller's daughter, "la Mugnaia", allegedly killed the city's dictator after he tried to kidnap her, sparking an uprising that gave the inhabitants more freedom. Ivrea's Carnival celebration now includes parades in medieval costumes, folkloric ensembles, and musical performances from Italy and Europe. A bean soup, fagiolata, is associated with the festival.

The Ambrosian Rite (Italian: rito ambrosiano) is a Latin liturgical rite of the Catholic Church and the Eastern Orthodox Church (specifically The Divine Liturgy of Saint Ambrose). The rite is named after Saint Ambrose, a bishop of Milan in the fourth century. It is used by around five million Catholics in the greater part of the Archdiocese of Milan (excluding Monza, Treviglio and Trezzo sull'Adda), in some parishes of the Diocese of Como, Bergamo, Novara, Lodi, in the Diocese of Lugano, Canton of Ticino, Switzerland, less prominently in some Western Rite orthodox parishes and on special occasions of other jurisdictions. In the most part of the Archdiocese of Milan, the Carnival lasts four more days, ending on the Saturday after Ash Wednesday, because of the Ambrosian Rite.

In Sardinia, the Carnival (in Sardinian language Carrasecare or Carrasegare) varies greatly from the one in the mainland of Italy. the majority of the Sardinian celebrations features not only feasts and parades but also crude fertility rites such as bloodsheds to fertilize the land, the death and the resurrection of the Carnival characters and representations of violence and torture. The typical characters of the Sardinian Carnival are zoomorphic and/or androgynous, such as the Mamuthones and Issohadores from Mamoiada, the Boes and Merdules from Ottana and many more. The Carnival is celebrated with street performances that are typically accompanied by Sardinian dirges called attittidus, meaning literally "cry of a baby when the mother doesn't want nursed him/her anymore" (from the word titta meaning breasts). Other particular and important Carnival instances in Sardinia are the Sartiglia in Oristano and the Tempio Pausania Carnival.

==== Lithuania ====
Užgavėnės is a Lithuanian festival that takes place on Shrove Tuesday. Its name in English means "the time before Lent". The celebration corresponds to Carnival holiday traditions.

Užgavėnės begins on the night before Ash Wednesday, when an effigy of winter (usually named Morė) is burnt. A major element symbolizes the defeat of winter in the Northern Hemisphere. It is a staged battle between Lašininis ("porky") personifying winter and Kanapinis ("hempen man") personifying spring. Devils, witches, goats, the grim reaper, and other joyful and frightening characters appear in costumes during the celebrations.

Eating pancakes is an important part of the celebration. Eating pancakes during Užgavėnės is a traditional practice symbolizing the sun's return and the anticipation of a bountiful harvest, aligning with the festival's theme of bidding farewell to winter and welcoming spring.

==== Luxembourg ====
In Luxembourg, the pre-Lenten holiday season is known as Fuesend. Throughout the Grand-Duchy, parades and parties are held.

Pétange is the home of the Grand-Duchy's largest pre-Lenten Karneval celebration. Annually hosting a cavalcade with roughly 1,200 participants and thousand of celebrants, the official name is Karneval Gemeng Péiteng or "Kagepe" (the initials in Luxembourgish are pronounced "Ka", "Ge" and "Pe").

The town of Remich holds a three-day-long celebration, notable for two special events in addition to its parades. The first is the Stréimännchen, which is the burning of a male effigy from the Remich Bridge that crosses the Moselle River separating the Grand Duchy from Germany. The Stréimännchen symbolizes the burning away of winter. The other special event at the Remich Fuesend celebrations is the Buergbrennen or bonfire that closes the celebration.

Like Remich, the town of Esch-sur-Alzette holds a three-day celebration. Other major Fuesend parades in Luxembourg are held in the towns of Diekirch and Schifflange.

==== Malta ====
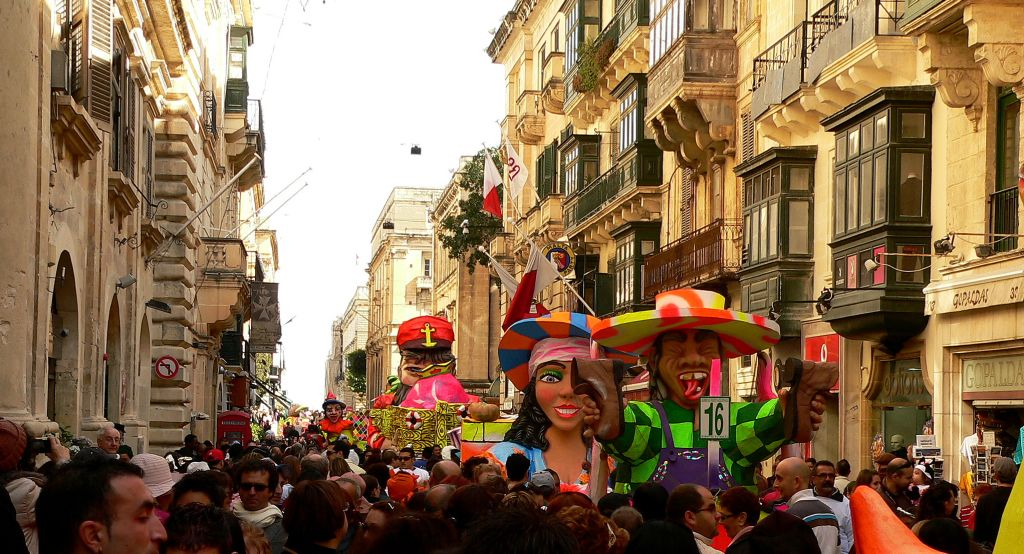
Carnival procession in Valletta, Malta

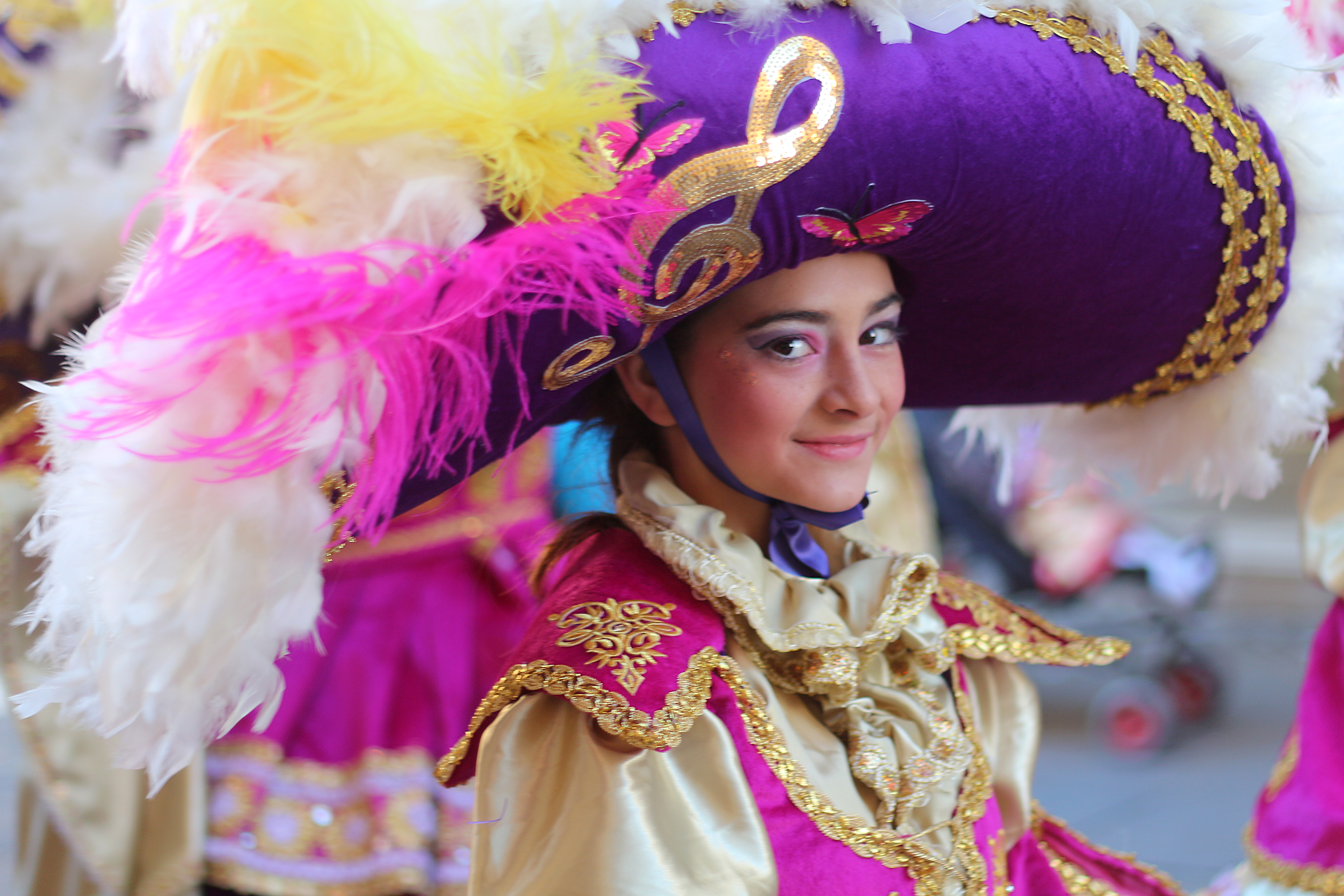
Carnival in Valletta, Malta

Carnival in Malta (Maltese: il-Karnival ta' Malta) was introduced to the islands by Grand Master Piero de Ponte in 1535. It is held during the week leading up to Ash Wednesday, and typically includes masked balls, fancy dresses, and grotesque mask competitions, lavish late-night parties, a colourful, ticker-tape parade of allegorical floats presided over by King Carnival (Maltese: ir-Re tal-Karnival), marching bands, and costumed revellers.

The largest celebration takes place in and around the capital city of Valletta and Floriana; several more "spontaneous" Carnivals take place in more remote areas. The Nadur Carnival is notable for its darker themes. In 2005, the Nadur Carnival hosted the largest-ever gathering of international Carnival organizers for the FECC's global summit.

Traditional dances include the parata, a lighthearted re-enactment of the 1565 victory of the Knights Hospitaller over the Turks, and an 18th-century court dance known as il-Maltija. Carnival food includes perlini (multi-coloured, sugar-coated almonds) and the prinjolata, which is a towering assembly of sponge cake, biscuits, almonds, and citrus fruits, topped with cream and pine nuts.

==== Netherlands ====
Carnival in the Netherlands is called carnaval, vastenavond ("Eve of Lent") or, in Limburgish, vastelaovend(j), and is mostly celebrated in traditionally Catholic regions, particularly in the southern provinces of North Brabant and Limburg, but also in Overijssel, especially in Twente. While Dutch carnival is officially celebrated on the Sunday through Tuesday preceding Ash Wednesday, since the 1970s the feast has gradually started earlier and generally includes now the preceding weekend and sometimes even multiple weekends before that. Although traditions vary from town to town, Dutch carnival usually includes a parade, a "Prince Carnival" plus cortège ("Council of 11", sometimes with a Jester or Adjutant), sometimes also the handing over by the mayor of the symbolic keys of the town to Prince Carnival, the burning or burial of a symbolic figure, a peasant wedding (boerenbruiloft), and eating herring (haring happen) on Ash Wednesday.

Two main variants can be distinguished: the Rhineland carnaval, found in the province of Limburg, and the Bourgondische carnaval, found mainly in North Brabant. Maastricht, Limburg's capital, holds a street carnival that features elaborate costumes.

The first known documentation dates from the late 8th century (Indiculus superstitionum et paganiarum), but carnaval was already mentioned during the First Council of Nicaea in 325 and by Caesarius of Arles (470–542) around 500 CE. In the Netherlands itself, the first documentation is found in 1383 in 's-Hertogenbosch. The oldest-known images of Dutch carnival festivities date from 1485, also in 's-Hertogenbosch.

Normal daily life comes to a stop for about a week in the southern part of the Netherlands during the carnival, with roads temporary blocked and many local businesses closed for the week as a result of employees who are en masse taking the days off during and the day after the carnival.

==== North Macedonia ====
The most popular Carnivals in North Macedonia are in Vevčani and Strumica.

The Vevčani Carnival (Macedonian: Вевчански Kарневал, translated Vevchanski Karneval) has been held for over 1,400 years, and takes place on 13 and 14 January (New Year's Eve and New Year's Day by the old calendar). The village becomes a live theatre where costumed actors improvise on the streets in roles such as the traditional "August the Stupid".

The Strumica Carnival (Macedonian: Струмички Карневал, translated Strumichki Karneval) has been held since at least 1670, when the Turkish author Evlija Chelebija wrote while staying there, "I came into a town located in the foothills of a high hillock and what I saw that night was masked people running house–to–house, with laughter, scream and song." The Carnival took an organized form in 1991; in 1994, Strumica became a member of FECC and in 1998 hosted the XVIII International Congress of Carnival Cities. The Strumica Carnival opens on a Saturday night at a masked ball where the Prince and Princess are chosen; the main Carnival night is on Tuesday, when masked participants (including groups from abroad) compete in various subjects. As of 2000, the Festival of Caricatures and Aphorisms has been held as part of Strumica's Carnival celebrations.

==== Poland ====
The Polish Carnival season includes Fat Thursday (Polish: Tłusty Czwartek), when pączki (doughnuts) are eaten, and Śledzik (Shrove Tuesday) or Herring Day. The Tuesday before the start of Lent is also often called Ostatki (literally "leftovers"), meaning the last day to party before the Lenten season.

The traditional way to celebrate Carnival is the kulig, a horse-drawn sleigh ride through the snow-covered countryside. In modern times, Carnival is increasingly seen as an excuse for intensive partying and has become more commercialized, with stores offering Carnival-season sales.

==== Portugal ====
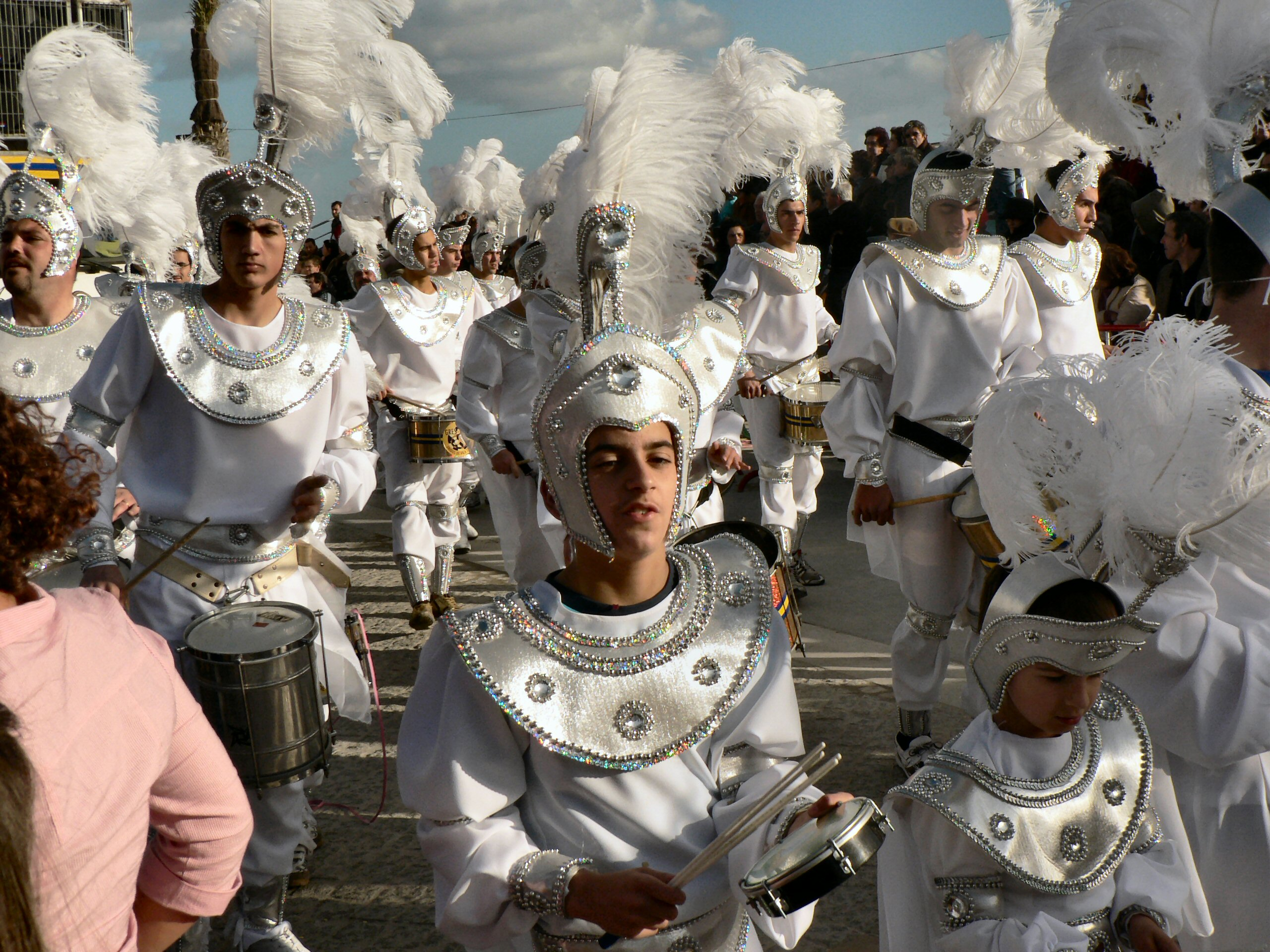
Sesimbra Carnival, in Sesimbra, Portugal

Carnival is Carnaval in Portugal, celebrated throughout the country, most famously in Ovar, Sesimbra, Madeira, Loulé, Nazaré, Mealhada, and Torres Vedras. Carnaval in Podence and Lazarim incorporates pagan traditions such as the careto, while the Torres Vedras celebration is probably the most typical.

===== Azores =====
On the islands of the Azores, local clubs and Carnival groups create colorful and creative costumes that jab at politics or culture.

On São Miguel Island, Carnival features street vendors selling fried dough, called a malassada. The festival on the biggest island starts off with a black tie grand ball, followed by Latin music at Coliseu Micaelense. A children's parade fills the streets of Ponta Delgada with children from each school district in costume. A massive parade continues past midnight, ending in fireworks.

The event includes theatre performances and dances. In the "Danças de Entrudo", hundreds of people follow the dancers around the island. Throughout the show the dancers act out scenes from daily life. The "Dances de Carnival" are allegorical and comedic tales acted out in the streets. The largest is in Angra do Heroísmo, with more than 30 groups performing. More Portuguese-language theatrical performances occur there than anywhere else.

Festivities end on Ash Wednesday, when locals sit down for the "Batatada" or potato feast, in which the main dish is salted cod with potatoes, eggs, mint, bread and wine. Residents then return to the streets for the burning of the "Carnival clown", ending the season.

===== Madeira =====
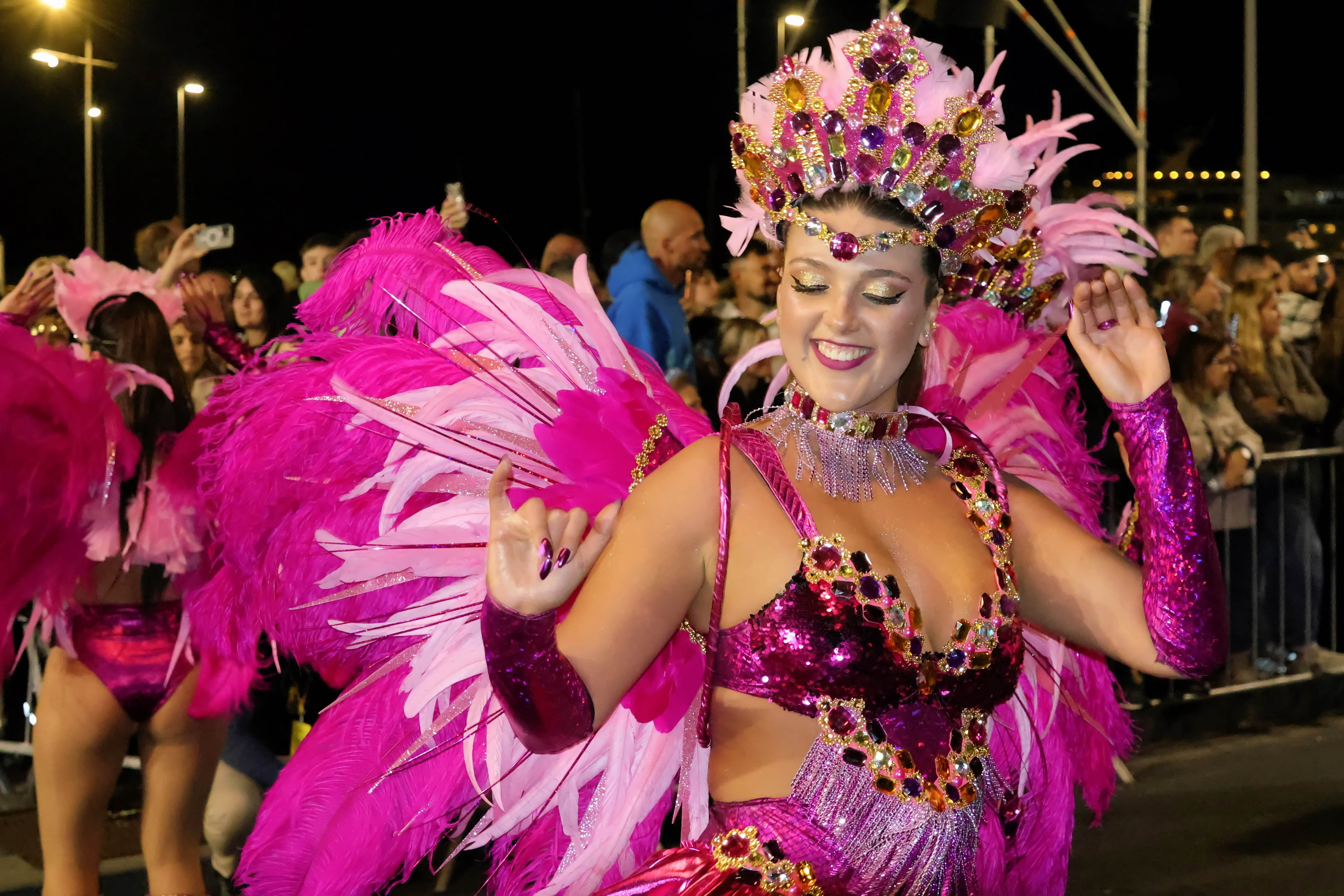
A dancer in the Carnival of Madeira, in Funchal, Portugal

On the island of Madeira, the island's capital, Funchal, wakes up on the Friday before Ash Wednesday to the sound of brass bands and Carnival parades throughout downtown. Festivities continue with concerts and shows in the Praça do Município for five consecutive days. The main Carnival street parade takes place on Saturday evening, with thousands of samba dancers filling the streets. The traditional street event takes place on Tuesday, featuring daring caricatures.

Arguably, Brazil's Carnival could be traced to the period of the Portuguese Age of Discoveries when their caravels passed regularly through Madeira, a territory that emphatically celebrated Carnival.

===== Ovar =====
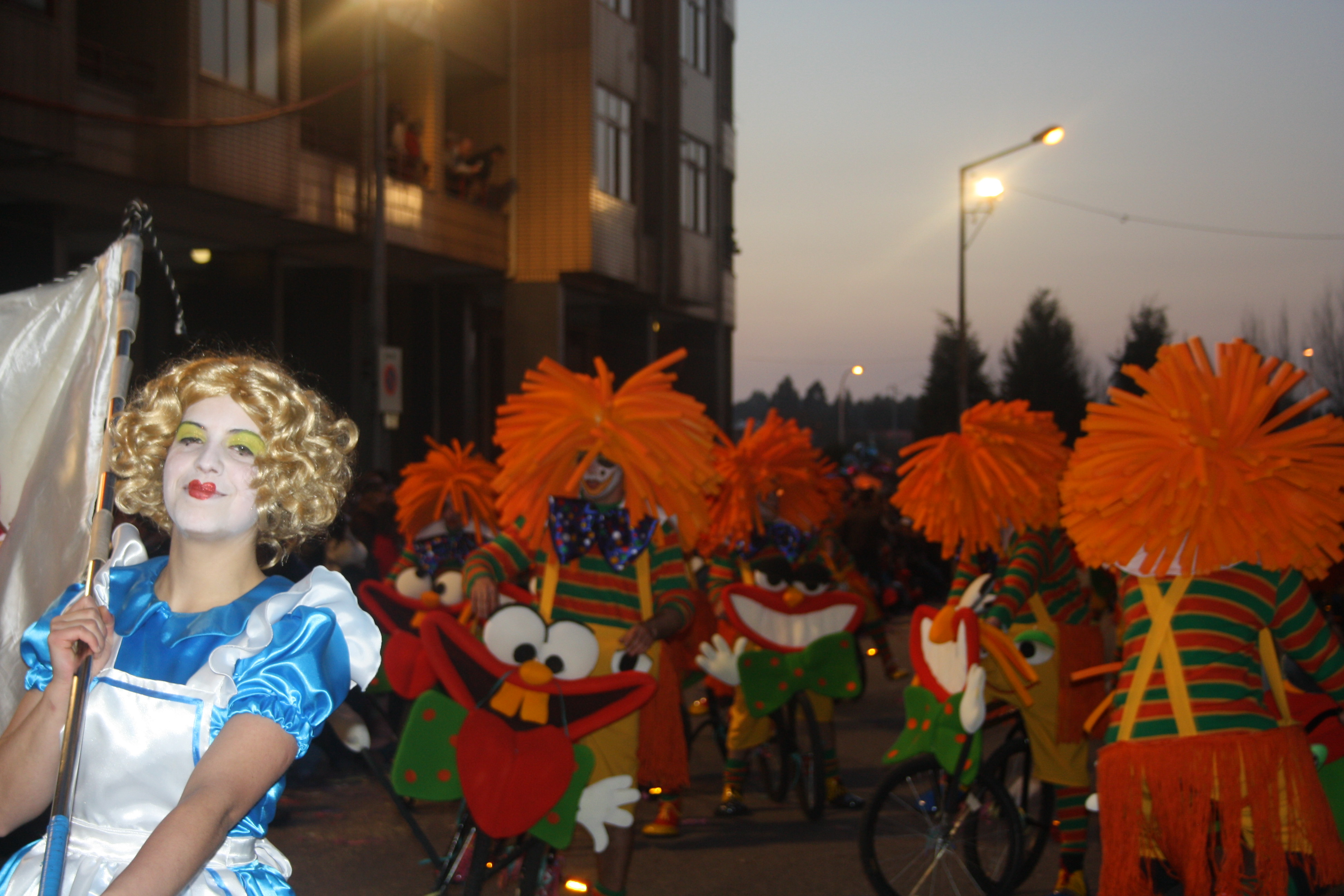
Carnival of Ovar in Ovar, Portugal

Carnival in the town of Ovar, in the Aveiro Region, began in 1952 and is the region's largest festivity, representing a large investment and the most important touristic event to the city. It is known for its creative designs, displayed in the Carnival Parade, which features troupes with themed costumes and music, ranging from the traditional to pop culture. Along with the Carnival Parade, there are five nights of partying, finishing with the famous 'Magical night' where people come from all over the country, mostly with their handmade costumes, only to have fun with the locals.

===== Other regions =====
In Estarreja, in the Central region of Portugal, the town's first documented references to Carnival date to the early twentieth century, with "Flower Battles", richly decorated floats that paraded through the streets. At the beginning of the twentieth century, these festivities ended with the deaths of its main promoters, only to reappear again in the 1960s to become one of many important Carnival festivals in Portugal.

In the Northern region of Podence, children appear from Sunday to Tuesday with tin masks and colorful multilayered costumes made from red, green and yellow wool. In the Central Portugal towns of Nelas and Canas de Senhorim, Carnival is an important tourist event. Nelas and Canas de Senhorim host four festive parades that offer colorful and creative costumes: Bairro da Igreja and Cimo do Povo in Nelas and do Paço and do Rossio in Canas de Senhorim.

In Lisbon, Carnival offers parades, dances and festivities featuring stars from Portugal and Brazil. The Loures Carnival celebrates the country's folk traditions, including the enterro do bacalhau or burial of the cod, which marks the end of Carnival and the festivities.

North of Lisbon is the famous Torres Vedras Carnival, described as the "most Portuguese in Portugal". The celebration highlight is a parade of creatively decorated streetcars that satirize society and politics.

Other Central Portugal towns, such as Fátima and Leiria, offer colorful, family-friendly celebrations. In these towns, everyone dresses up as if it were Halloween. Children and adults wear masks.

In the Algarve region, several resort towns offer Carnival parades. Besides the themed floats and cars, the festivities include "samba" groups, bands, dances, and music.

In Lazarim, a civil parish in the municipality of Lamego, celebrations follow the pagan tradition of Roman Saturnalias. It celebrates by burning colorful effigies and dressing in home-made costumes. Locally-made wooden masks are worn. The masks are effigies of men and women with horns, but both roles are performed by men. They are distinguished by their clothes, with caricature attributes of both men and women.

The Lazarim Carnaval cycle encompasses two periods, the first starting on the fifth Sunday before Quinquagesima Sunday. Masked figures and people wearing large sculpted heads walk through the town. The locals feast on meats, above all pork. The second cycle, held on Sundays preceding Ash Wednesday, incorporates the tradition of the Compadres and Comadres, with men and women displaying light-hearted authority over the other.

Over the five weeks, men prepare large masked heads and women raise funds to pay for two mannequins that will be sacrificed in a public bonfire. This is a key event and is unique to Portugal. During the bonfire, a girl reads the Compadre's will and a boy reads the Comadre's will. The executors of the will are named, a donkey is symbolically distributed to both female and male "heirs", and then there is the final reckoning in which the Entrudo, or Carnival doll, is burned.

==== Russia ====
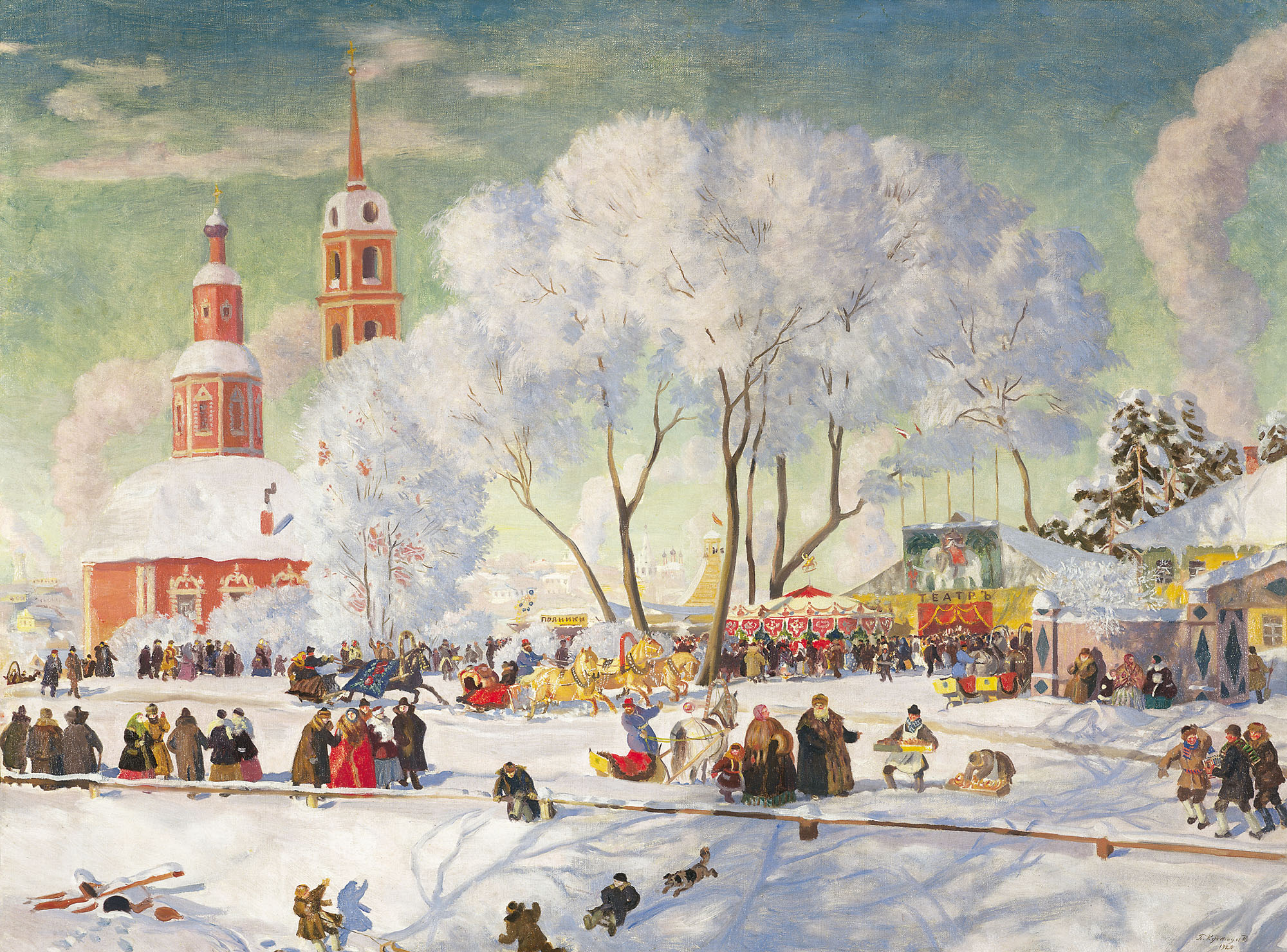
Boris Kustodiev's painting of Maslenitsa, Russia

Maslenitsa (Масленица, also called "Pancake Week" or "Cheese Week") is a Russian folk holiday that incorporates some pagan traditions. It is celebrated during the last week before Lent. The essential element is bliny, Russian pancakes, popularly taken to symbolize the sun. Round and golden, they are made from the rich foods allowed that week by the Orthodox traditions: butter, eggs, and milk. (In the tradition of Orthodox Lent, the consumption of meat ceases one week before that of milk and eggs.)

Maslenitsa also includes masquerades, snowball fights, sledding, swinging on swings, and sleigh rides. The mascot is a brightly dressed straw effigy of Lady Maslenitsa, formerly known as Kostroma. The celebration culminates on Sunday evening, when Lady Maslenitsa is stripped of her finery and put to the flames of a bonfire.

==== Slovakia ====
In Slovakia, the Fašiangy (fašiang, fašangy) takes place from Three Kings Day (Traja králi) until the midnight before Ash Wednesday (Škaredá streda or Popolcová streda). At the midnight marking the end of fašiangy, a symbolic burial ceremony for the contrabass is performed, because music ceases for Lent.

==== Slovenia ====
The Slovenian name for carnival is pust. The Slovenian countryside displays a variety of disguised groups and individual characters, among which the most popular and characteristic is the Kurent (plural: Kurenti), a monstrous and demon-like, but fluffy figure. The most significant festival is held in Ptuj (see: Kurentovanje). Its special feature are the Kurents themselves, magical creatures from another world, who visit major events throughout the country, trying to banish the winter and announce spring's arrival, fertility, and new life with noise and dancing. The origin of the Kurent is a mystery, and not much is known of the times, beliefs, or purposes connected with its first appearance. The origin of the name itself is obscure.

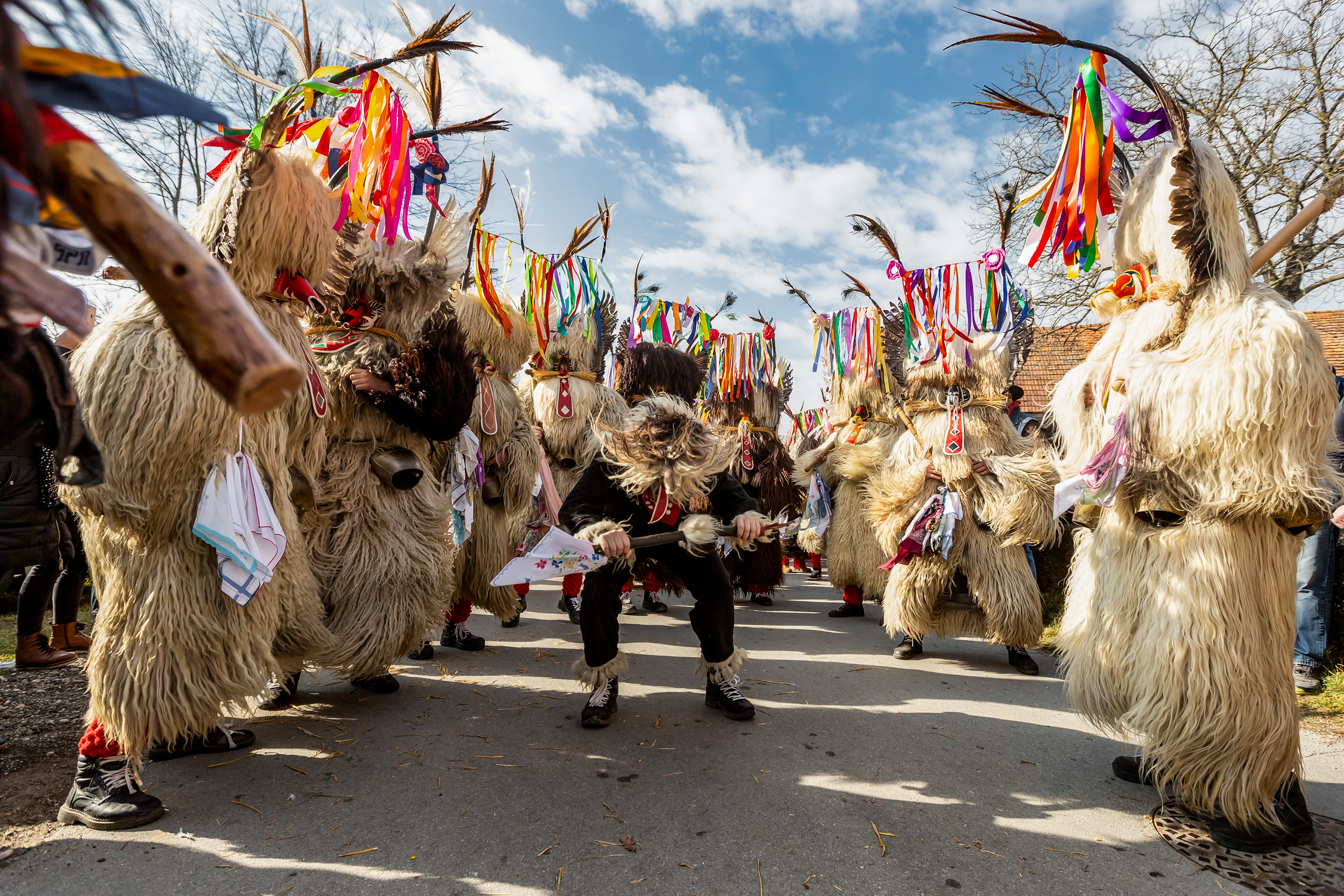
Kurentovanje in Ptuj, Slovenia

The Cerknica Carnival is heralded by a figure called "Poganjič" carrying a whip. In the procession, organised by the "Pust society", a monstrous witch named Uršula is driven from the mountain Slivnica, to be burned at the stake on Ash Wednesday. Unique to this region is a group of dormice, driven by the Devil and a huge fire-breathing dragon. Cerkno and its surrounding area are known for the Laufarji, Carnival figures with artistically carved wooden masks.

The Maškare from Dobrepolje used to represent a triple character: the beautiful, the ugly (among which the most important represented by an old man, an old woman, a hunchback, and a Kurent), and the noble (imitating the urban elite).

The major part of the population, especially the young and children, dress up in ordinary non-ethnic costumes, going to school, work, and organized events, where prizes are given for the best and most original costumes. Costumed children sometimes go from house to house asking for treats.

==== Spain ====
The Burial of the Sardine, Francisco Goya, c. 1812

Arguably the most famous Carnivals in Spain are Santa Cruz, Las Palmas, Sitges, Vilanova i la Geltrú, Tarragona, Águilas, Solsona, Cádiz, Badajoz, Bielsa (an ancestral Carnival celebration), Plan, San Juan de Plan, Laza, Verín, Viana, and Xinzo de Limia.

One of the oldest pre-Indo-European carnival in Europe takes place in Ituren and Zubieta in Navarre in late January/early February. The carnival symbolises the eternal struggle between the forces of good and evil, light and darkness, winter and spring.

===== Andalusia =====
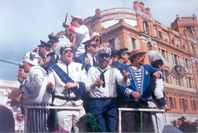
A choir singing in the Carnival of Cádiz, in Cádiz, Andalusia, Spain

In Cádiz, the costumes worn are often related to recent news, such as the bird flu epidemic in 2006, during which many people were disguised as chickens. The feeling of this Carnival is the sharp criticism, the funny play on words and the imagination in the costumes, more than the glamorous dressings. It is traditional to paint the face with lipstick as a humble substitute of a mask.

The most famous groups are the chirigotas, choirs, and comparsas. The chirigotas are well known witty, satiric popular groups who sing about politics, new times, and household topics, wearing the same costume, which they prepare for the whole year. The Choirs (coros) are wider groups that go on open carts through the streets singing with an orchestra of guitars and lutes. Their signature piece is the "Carnival Tango", alternating comical and serious repertory. The comparsas are the serious counterpart of the chirigota in Cádiz, and the poetic lyrics and the criticism are their main ingredients. They have a more elaborated polyphony that is easily recognizable by the typical countertenor voice.

===== Canary Islands =====
The Santa Cruz Carnival is the most important festival for Spanish tourism and Spain's largest Carnival. In 1980, it was declared a Festival Tourist International Interest. Every February, Santa Cruz de Tenerife, the capital of the largest of the Canary Islands, hosts the event, attracting around a million people.

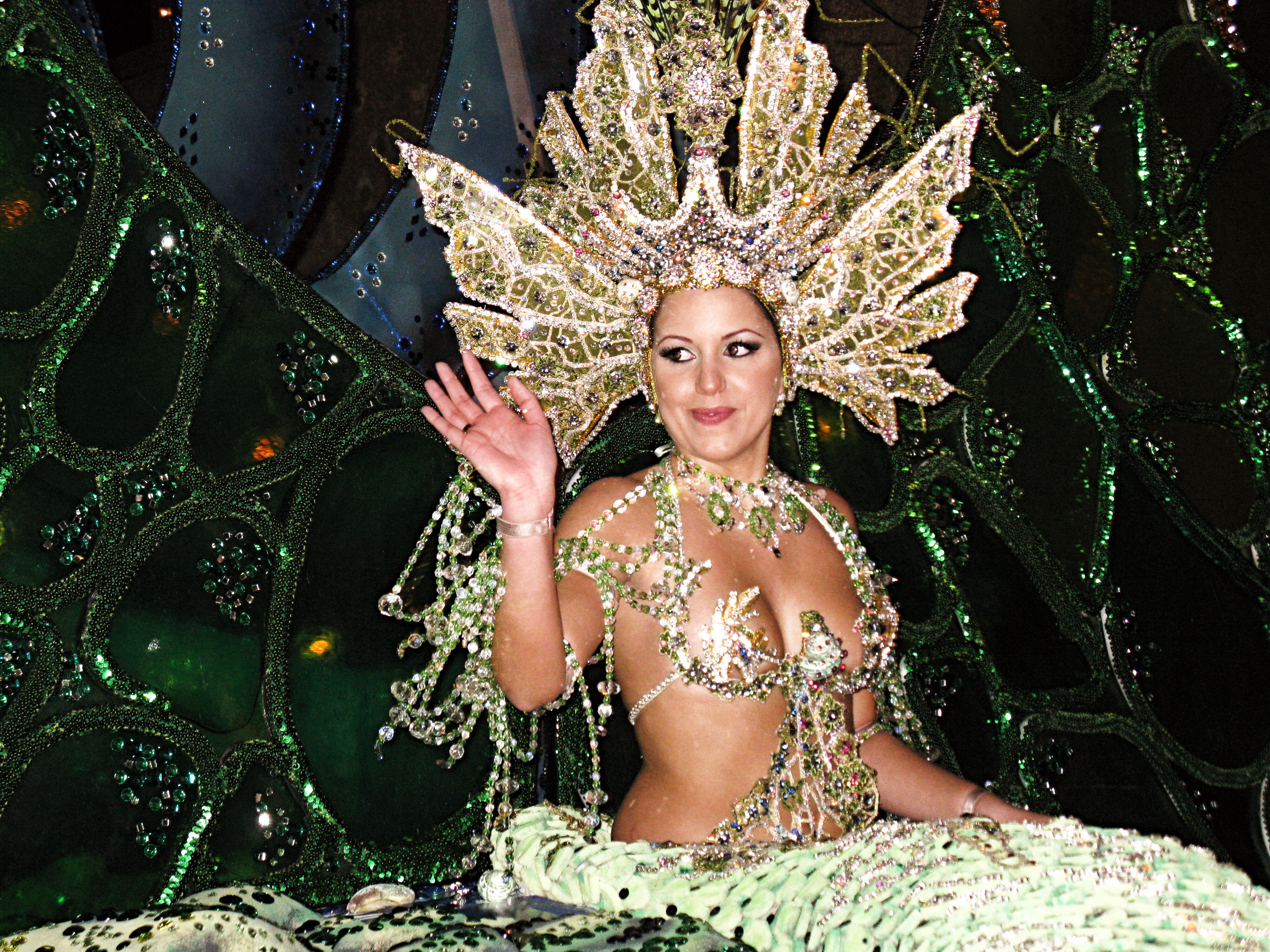
Carnival Queen of Santa Cruz de Tenerife, Canary Islands, Spain

In 1987, Cuban singer Celia Cruz with orchestra Billo's Caracas Boys performed at the "Carnival Chicharrero", attended by 250,000 people. This was registered in the Guinness Book of World Records as the largest gathering of people in an outdoor plaza to attend a concert, a record she holds today.

The Carnival of Las Palmas (Gran Canaria) has a drag queen's gala where a jury chooses a winner.

===== Catalonia =====
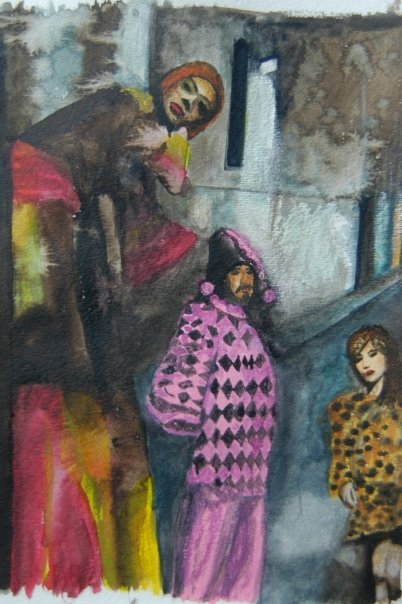
Vidalot is the last night of revelry before Ash Wednesday in Vilanova, Catalonia, Spain. Water color painting by Brad Erickson.

In Catalonia, people dress in masks and costume (often in themed groups) and organize a week-long series of parties, pranks, outlandish activities such as bed races, street dramas satirizing public figures, and raucous processions to welcome the arrival of Sa Majestat el Rei Carnestoltes ("His Majesty King Carnival"), known by various titles, including el Rei dels poca-soltes ("King of the crackpots"), Princep etern de Cornudella ("eternal Prince of Cuckoldry"), Duc de ximples i corrumputs ("Duke of the fool and corrupt"), Marquès de la bona mamella ("Marquis of the lovely breast"), Comte de tots els barruts ("Count of the insolent"), Baró de les Calaverades ("Baron of mocturnal debaucheries"), and Senyor de l'alt Plàtan florit, dels barraquers i gamberrades i artista d'honor dalt del llit ("Lord of the tall blooming Banana, of the voyeurs and punks and the artist of honor upon the bed").

The King presides over a period of misrule in which conventional social rules may be broken and reckless behavior is encouraged. Festivities are held in the open air, beginning with a cercavila, a ritual procession throughout the town to call everyone to attend. Rues of masked revelers dance alongside. On Thursday, Dijous Gras (Fat Thursday) is celebrated, also called 'omelette day' (el dia de la truita), on which coques (de llardons, butifarra d'ou, butifarra), and omelettes are eaten. The festivities end on Ash Wednesday with elaborate funeral rituals marking the death of King Carnival, who is typically burned on a pyre in what is called the "burial of the sardine" (enterrament de la sardina), or, in Vilanova, as l'enterro.

The Carnival of Vilanova i la Geltrú has a documented history from 1790 and is one of the richest in the variety of its acts and rituals. It adopts an ancient style in which satire, the grotesque body (particularly cross-dressing and displays of exaggerated bellies, noses, and phalli), and, above all, active participation are valued over glamorous, media-friendly spectacles that Vilanovins mock as "thighs and feathers". It is best known for Les Comparses, a tumultuous dance held on Sunday in which thousands of dancers in traditional dresses and Mantons de Manila (Manila Shawls), organized into groups of couples march in the street forming lines while throwing tons of hard candies at one another. Vilanovinians organize several rituals during the week. On Dijous Gras, Vilanovin children are excused from school to participate in the Merengada, a day-long scene of eating and fighting with sticky, sweet meringue while adults have a meringue battle at midnight at the historic Plaça de les Cols.

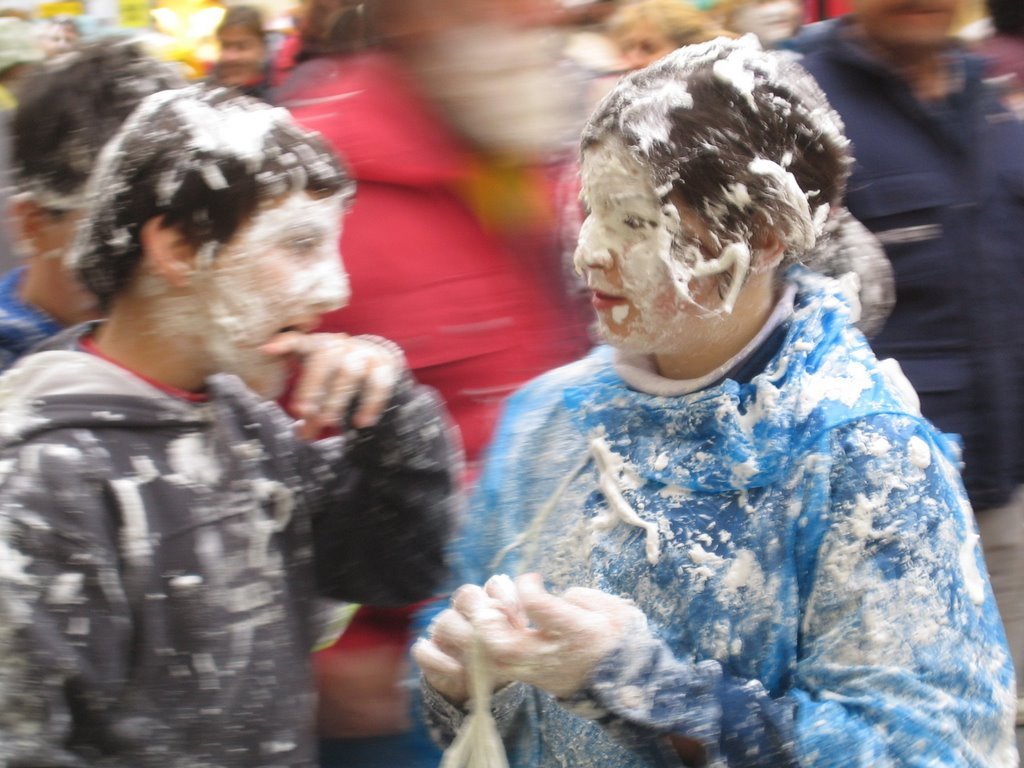
Children become covered in meringue during Dijous Gras, in Vilanova, Catalonia, Spain

On Friday citizens are called to a parade for the arrival of King Carnival called l'Arrivo that changes every year. It includes a raucous procession of floats and dancers lampooning current events or public figures and a bitingly satiric sermon (el sermo) delivered by the King himself. On Saturday, the King's procession and his concubines scandalize the town with their sexual behavior; the mysterious Moixo Foguer (Little-Bird-Bonfire) is shown accompanied by the Xerraire (jabberer), who try to convince the crowd about the wonders that this mighty bird carries in a box (which ends up being in fact a naked person covered in feathers); and other items such as: sport acts and barbecues in the streets; the talking-dance of the Mismatched Couples (Ball de Malcasats); the children's King Caramel whose massive belly, long nose and sausage-like hair hint at his insatiable appetites; or the debauched Nit dels Mascarots dance.

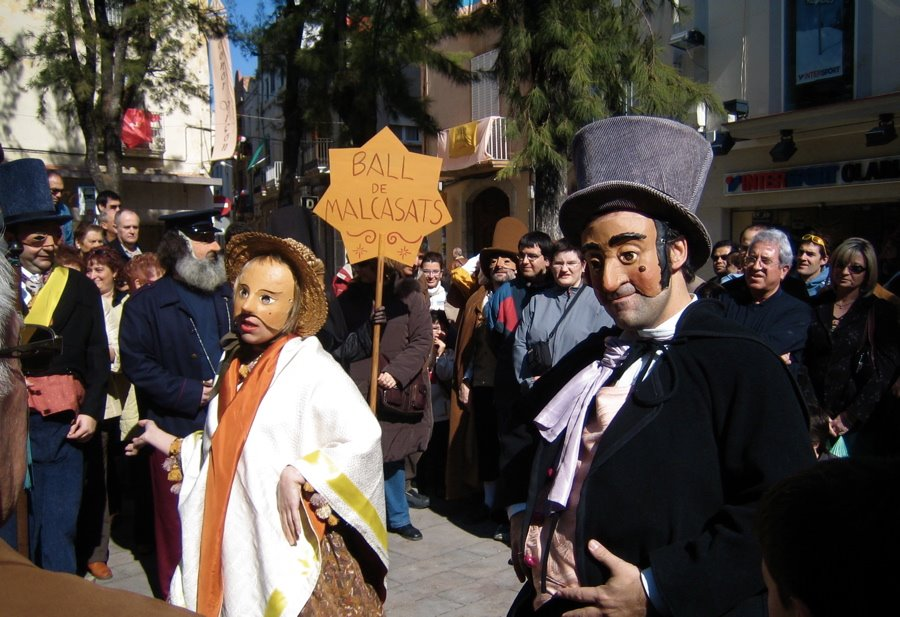
The Ball de Malcasats (Dance of the Mismatched Couples) is a satiric talking-dance traditional to Carnaval in Vilanova, Catalonia, Spain.

After Sunday, vilanovinians continue its Carnival with the children's party Vidalet, the satirical chorus of Carnestoltes songs and the last night of revelry, the Vidalot. For the King's funeral, people dress in elaborate mourning costume, many of them cross-dressing men who carry bouquets of phallic vegetables. In the funeral house, the body of the King is surrounded by weeping concubines, crying over the loss of sexual pleasure brought about by his death. The King's body is carried to the Plaça de la Vila where a satiric eulogy is delivered while the townspeople eat salty grilled sardines with bread and wine, suggesting the symbolic cannibalism of the communion ritual. Finally, amid rockets and explosions, the King's body is burned in a massive pyre.

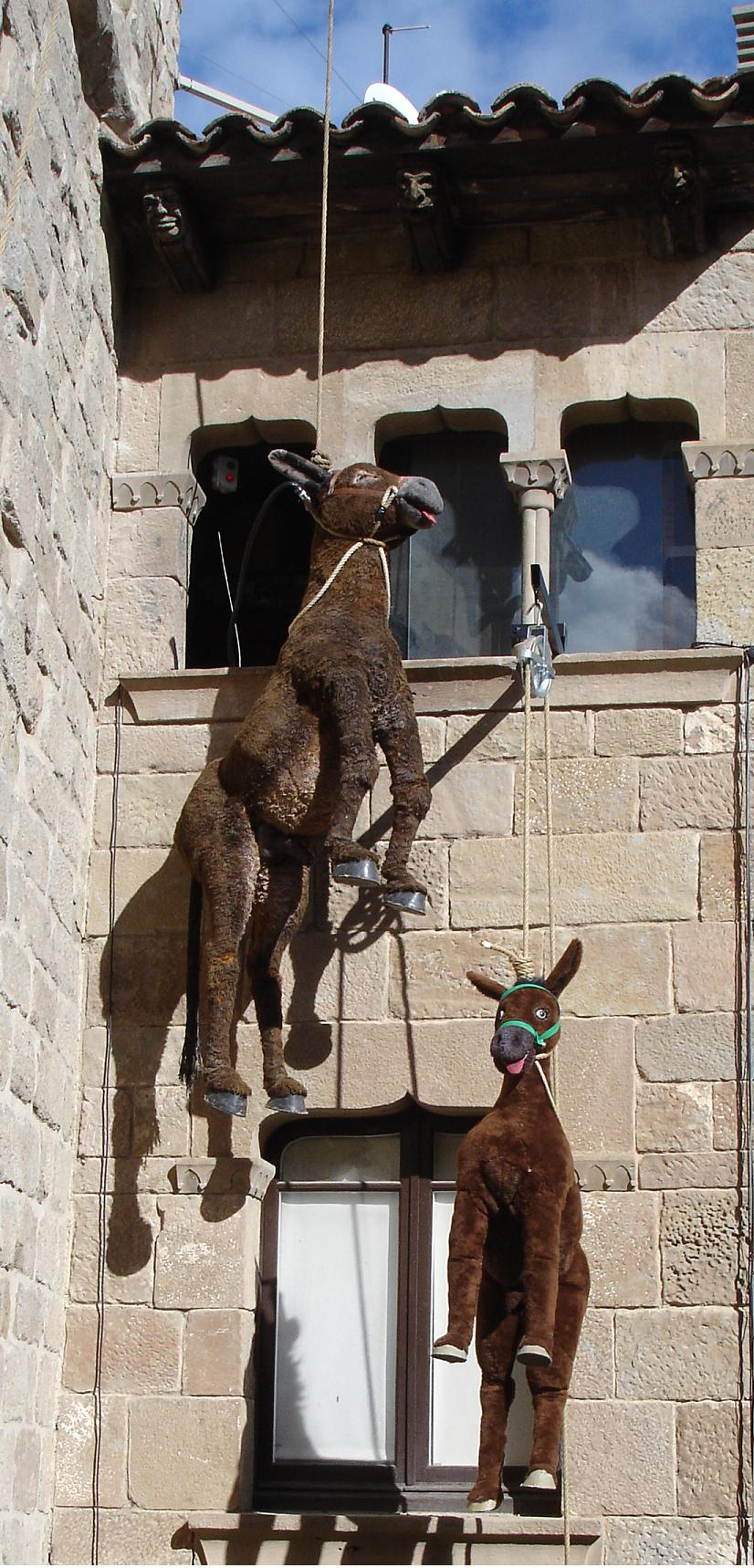
Donkeys of Solsona, Catalonia, Spain, hung in the tower bell

Carnaval de Solsona takes place in Solsona, Lleida. It is one of the longest; free events in the streets and nightly concerts run for more than a week. The Carnival is known for a legend that explains how a donkey was hung at the tower bell − because the animal wanted to eat grass that grew on the top of the tower. To celebrate this legend, locals hang a stuffed donkey at the tower that "pisses" above the excited crowd using a water pump. This event is the most important and takes place on Saturday night. For this reason, the inhabitants are called matarrucs ("donkey killers").

"Comparses" groups organize free activities. These groups of friends create and personalize a uniformed suit to wear during the festivities.

In Sitges, special feasts include xatonades (xató is a traditional local salad of the Penedès coast) served with omelettes. Two important moments are the Rua de la Disbauxa (Debauchery Parade) on Sunday night and the Rua de l'Extermini (Extermination Parade) on Tuesday night. In 2022, the Rua de la Disbauxa hosted 34 floats and over 1,200 participants.

Tarragona has one of the region's most complete ritual sequences. The events start with the building of a huge barrel and ends with its burning with the effigies of the King and Queen. On Saturday, the main parade takes place with masked groups, zoomorphic figures, music, and percussion bands, and groups with fireworks (the devils, the dragon, the ox, the female dragon). Carnival groups stand out for their clothes full of elegance, showing brilliant examples of fabric crafts, at the Saturday and Sunday parades. About 5,000 people are members of the parade groups.

===== Galicia =====
In Galicia, the celebration is commonly known as Entroido, or otherwise Antroido, Entroiro, Entruido or Entrudio. Throughout history, the cities, towns and villages of Galicia had poor connections between each other, so Entroidos are very diverse with different cultural traditions and characters based in the zone you're in. Nine Entroido celebrations have been declared as places of touristic interest in Galicia: Xinzo de Limia, Cobres, Laza, Verín, Felos de Maceda, Xenerais do Ulla, Vilariño de Conso, Androlla and Viana do Bolo and Manzaneda.

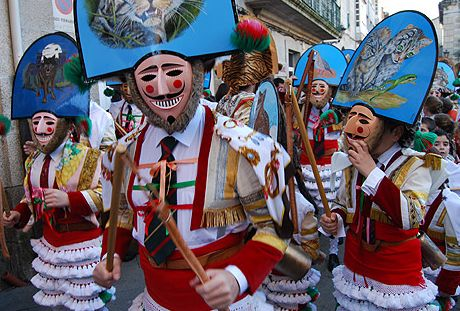
The Cigarrón, the typical character of the Entroido, in Verín, Galicia, Spain

In Galician cuisine, there are various traditional dishes of Entroido, such as Filloas (a dish similar to crêpes) and Orellas (A traditional dish of Catalonia and the Valencian Community, but also traditionally served in Galician and French carnivals). Other traditional foods include Chorizo, Lacón, Caldo, Androlla and Pig Heads.

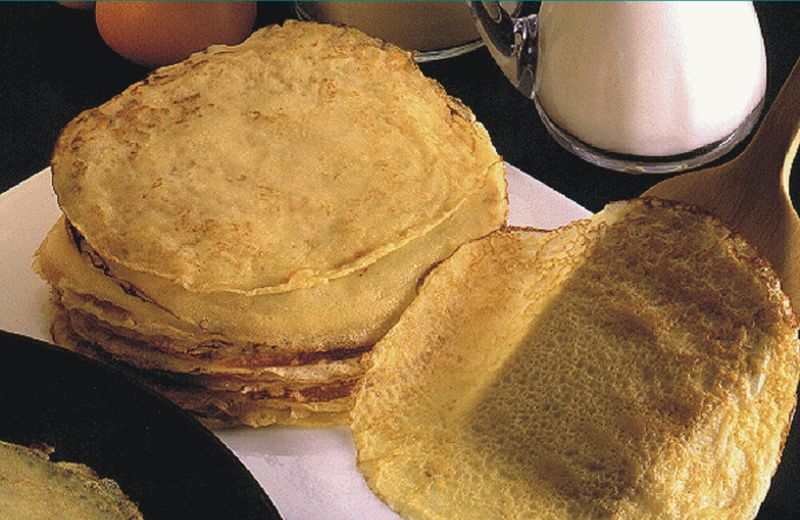
Filloas, a crêpe-like typical dish served in Galician Entroidos

===== Valencian Community =====
One of the most important Spanish Carnival Festivals is celebrated in Vinaròs. The Carnival Festival in Vinaròs was declared of Regional Touristic Interest. Every year in February, forty days before the Spanish Cuaresma, thirty-three "comparsas" go singing, dancing and walking down the streets in a costume parade in Vinaròs. In addition, many other festive, cultural and musical activities of all ages take place, such as the so-called "Entierro de la Sardina" (Burial of the Sardine). The most important event is the gala performance of the Carnival's Queen. In this show, it is elected the Queen of the Carnival, the major representative of the Carnival in Vinaròs all year round.

==== Turkey ====
For almost five centuries, local Greek Orthodox communities throughout Istanbul celebrated Carnival with weeks of bawdy parades, lavish balls, and street parties. This continued for weeks before Lent. Baklahorani took place on Shrove Monday or Clean Monday, the last day of the carnival season. The event was led by the Greek Orthodox community, but the celebrations were public and inter-communal. The final celebration was sited in the Kurtuluş district. In 2010, the festival was revived.

==== United Kingdom ====
In England, the three days before Lent were called Shrovetide. A time for confessing sins ("shriving"), it had fewer festivities than the continental Carnivals. Today, Shrove Tuesday is celebrated as Pancake Day, but little else of the Lent-related Shrovetide survived the 16th-century English Reformation.

Since 2012, Hastings in East Sussex has celebrated with its own Mardi Gras, or Fat Tuesday. Five days of music and street events culminating with a Grand Ball on Fat Tuesday itself.

- Birmingham International Carnival
- West Country Carnival
- Dover Carnival
- Leicester Caribbean Carnival
- Notting Hill Carnival
- Leeds West Indian Carnival
- St Pauls Carnival

== See also ==
- Adloyada
- Boeuf gras
- Calabar Carnival
- Careto
- Carnival of Basel
- Carnival in Mexico
- Carny
- Cirque du Soleil
- Cologne Carnival
- Culture of Popular Laughter
- Fair
- Feast of Fools
- Federation of European Carnival Cities
- Jamaica Carnival
- Mardi Gras
- Mardi Gras in Mobile, Alabama
- New Orleans Mardi Gras
- Sitalsasthi
- Narrenmarsch
- Traveling carnival
