= List of Caribbean carnivals around the world =

Annual cultural celebration spanning various Caribbean islands

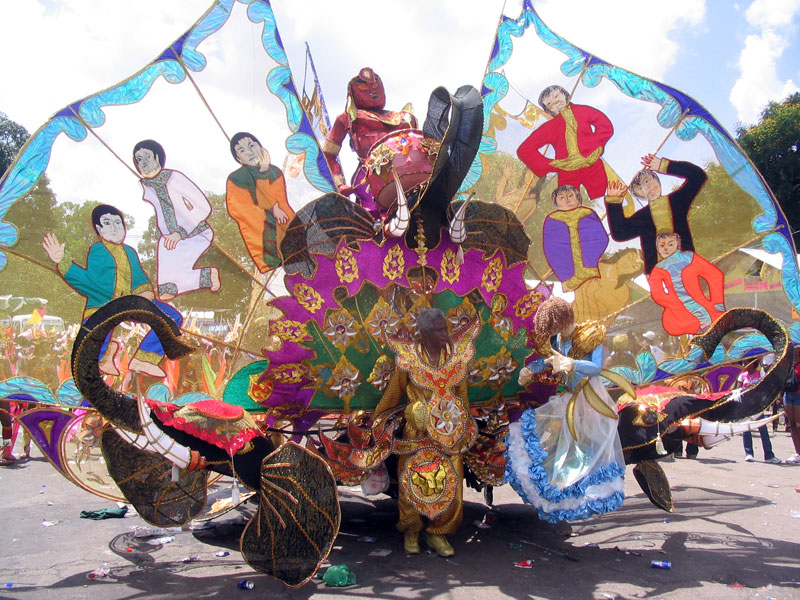
Trinidad and Tobago Carnival

Caribbean Carnival is the cultural celebration held annually throughout the year in many Caribbean islands and worldwide. It is a highly anticipated festival in the Caribbean where locals and visitors come together to dance, savor cultural music, and indulge in traditional foods.

It stems from a pagan holiday, later adopted by the Roman Catholic Church as Carne Vale. European slave traders brought it to the Caribbean, excluding African slaves and hosting lavish masquerade balls. After emancipation, freed African slaves transformed the festival into a celebration of freedom, blending African heritage and Caribbean Creole culture.

In 1834, the Caribbean festival took root in Trinidad and Tobago, when French settlers brought the Fat Tuesday masquerade tradition to the island. It soon became a vibrant celebration, blending Creole Canboulay festivities with the European masquerade, eventually evolving into the modern Caribbean Carnival. At its start, formerly enslaved individuals expressed their freedom through music, clothing, and dance, leading to the dynamic fusion of African influences and Creole culture.

Carnival traditions differ across islands, typically consisting of activities like playing Mas (masquerade), the selection of a King and Queen, and reveling in diverse Caribbean music styles like calypso, jam-band, steelpan, and soca. Pre-carnival festivities such as J'ouvert feature cultural characters such as the Moko Jumbie and Dame Lorraine, adding to the vibrant celebrations.

Although there are similar celebrations, not every Caribbean Carnival adopts the name "carnival". For instance, Junkanoo (also Jonkunnu) which originated in Jamaica, is a traditional Christmastime festival with similar characters and blend of cultures. It is also celebrated in the Bahamas, Belize and North Carolina. Barbados hosts the Crop Over Festival, dating back to the 17th century, honoring successful sugar cane harvests at the end of July.

== Local Caribbean carnivals ==
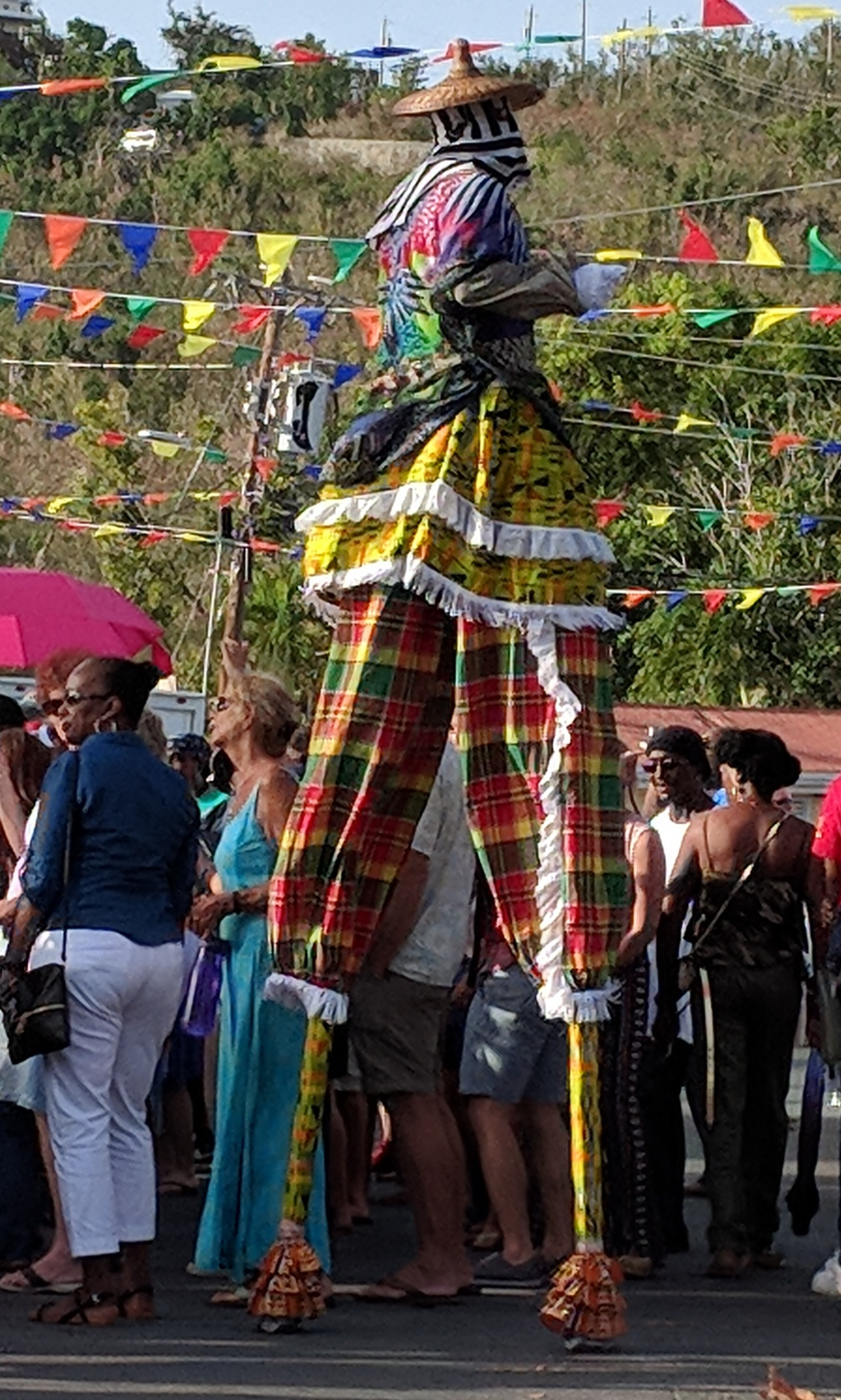
Mocko jumbie, St. John Festival, USVI

Approximate dates are given for the concluding festivities. Carnival season may last for more than a month prior to the concluding festivities, and the exact dates vary from year to year.

- Anguilla — Anguilla Summer Festival, early August
- Antigua and Barbuda
  - Antigua — Antigua Carnival, early August
  - Barbuda — Caribana, early June
- Aruba — Carnival, February, Ash Wednesday
- Austria — Vienna Carnival, first weekend in July
- Barbados — Crop Over, early August
- Bahamas - Bahamas Junkanoo Carnival, first week of May
- Belize — Carnival in Belize, September
- Bermuda — Bermuda Carnival (third weekend in June) https://carnivalinbermuda.com/
- Bonaire — Carnival, February Ash Wednesday
- British Virgin Islands
  - Tortola — BVI Emancipation (August) Festival, early August
  - Virgin Gorda — Virgin Gorda Easter Festival Celebrations, late March/early April
- Canada
  - Toronto — Caribana Toronto Caribbean Carnival (early August)
- Cayman Islands — Batabano, late April/early May,
- Cayman Islands – CayMAS Carnival, late June/early July
- Cuba
  - Cuba — Carnival of Santiago de Cuba, July
  - Cuba — Havana Carnival, July/August
- Curaçao — Carnival, February, Ash Wednesday
- Dominica — Carnival, February, Ash Wednesday
- Dominican Republic — Dominican Carnival, February, Dominican Independence Day
- French Guiana — Carnival in French Guiana usually takes place between Epiphany and Ash Wednesday, ending on Mardi Gras.
- Grenada
  - Carriacou — Carriacou Carnival, February, Ash Wednesday
  - Grenada — Spicemas, early August
- Guadeloupe — Carnaval – February, Ash Wednesday
- Guyana — Mashramani (Mash), February 23, Guyanese Republic Day
- Guyana — Guyana Carnival, Mid-May,
- Haiti — Kanaval, February, Ash Wednesday
- Jamaica
  - Jamaica Carnival / Bacchanal Jamaica, late March/early April
  - Ocho Rios Carnival, March
- Martinique — Carnival, February, Ash Wednesday
- Montserrat — Montserrat Festival, mid-December to early January, New Year's Day
- Puerto Rico — Carnaval de Ponce, February, Ash Wednesday
- Saba — Saba Summer Festival, late July/early August
- Saint-Barthélemy — Carnival, February, Ash Wednesday
- Saint Lucia — Lucian Carnival, July
- Saint Kitts and Nevis
  - Saint Kitts — Sugar Mas, December/January
  - Nevis — Culturama, late July/early August
- Saint-Martin
  - Dutch Side — Carnival, April
  - French Side — Carnival, February
- Saint Vincent and the Grenadines — Vincy Mas, late June/early July
- Sint Eustatius — Statia Carnival, late July/early August
- Sint Maarten — Carnival, late April/early May
- Trinidad and Tobago
  - Trinidad — Carnival, February, Ash Wednesday
  - Tobago — Tobago Carnival, October, Ash Wednesday
- Turks and Caicos Islands — Junkanoo Jump Up, in January
- United States Virgin Islands
  - Saint Croix — Crucian Carnival, late December/early January Three King's Day
  - Saint John — St. John Festival, June through July 3 & 4, V.I. Emancipation Day and U.S. Independence Day
  - Saint Thomas — V.I. Carnival, April through early May

== International Caribbean carnivals ==
=== Canada ===
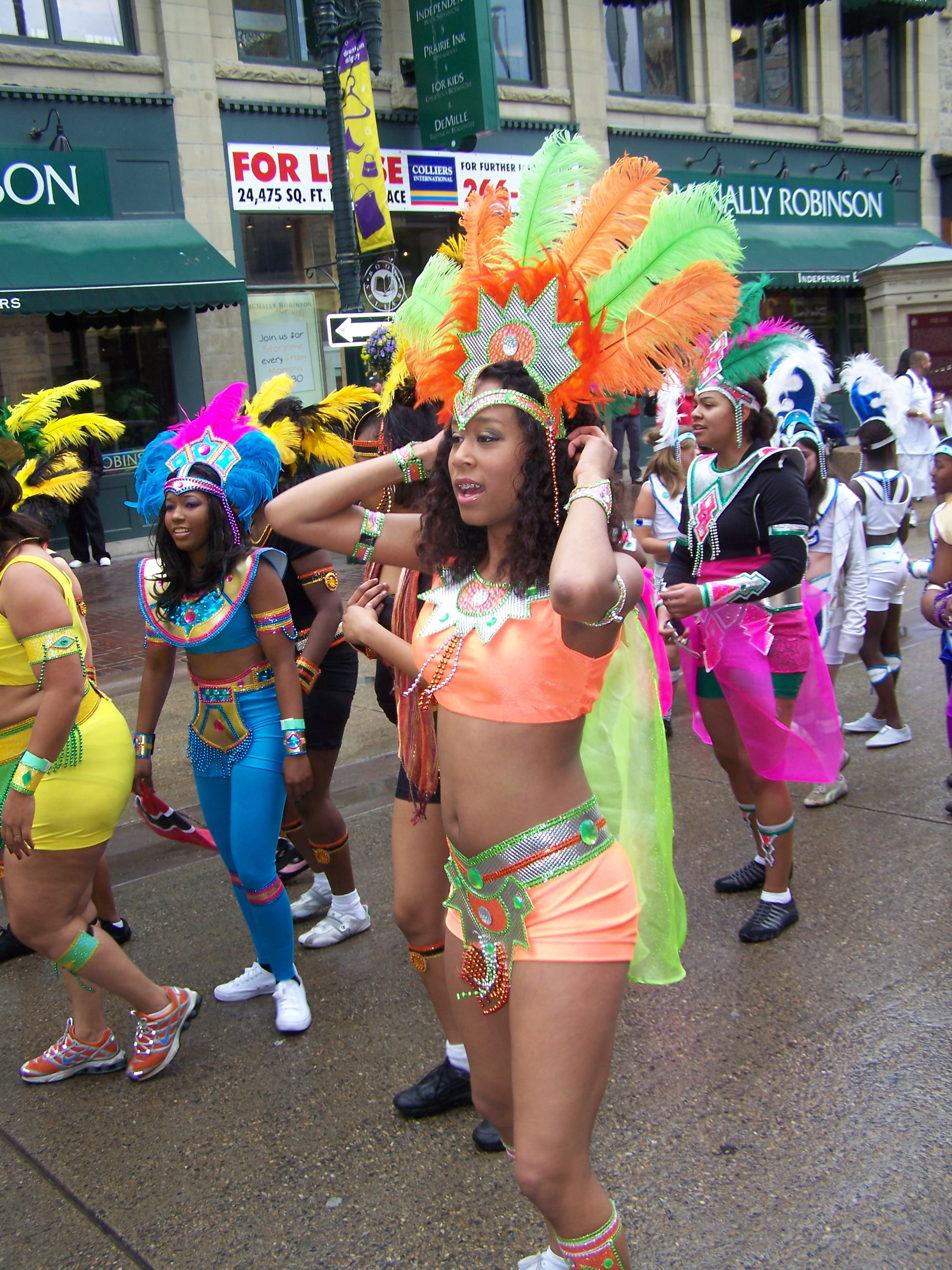
Carifest Parade in Calgary

- "Caribe-Expo" — In the city of Ottawa in Ontario, Canada
- CariMas (previously "Carifiesta") — In the city of Montreal in Quebec, Canada, typically on Canada Day weekend
- "Toronto Caribbean Carnival — In Toronto, Ontario, it draws close to a million visitors to the city
- "Carnival"(cancelled) — In the city of Hamilton, 1 week after Toronto's Caribana
- Carifest — In the city of Calgary in Alberta, Canada
- "Cariwest" — Held annually the second week of August in Edmonton, Alberta, Canada, drawing more than 60,000 visitors a year. Cariwest boasts an amazing display of masqueraders in the main parade, and is a beautiful festival full of food and entertainment in the heart of downtown.
- Barrie's Caribfest (parade has been cancelled since 2011)
- CariBridge Caribbean Carnival in Lethbridge Alberta brings a unique and diverse culture to southern Alberta and focuses on bringing Caribbean culture through food, music, dance, and art.

An attraction of this Caribbean event is its location. This event features Canadian and international Caribbean performers in music, dance, costumes, and world drumming. Events are held from Friday to Sunday throughout every third weekend of August. The Grand Parade in Toronto is held on the first Saturday of August to commemorate the abolition of the slave trade on August 1, 1838.

=== France ===
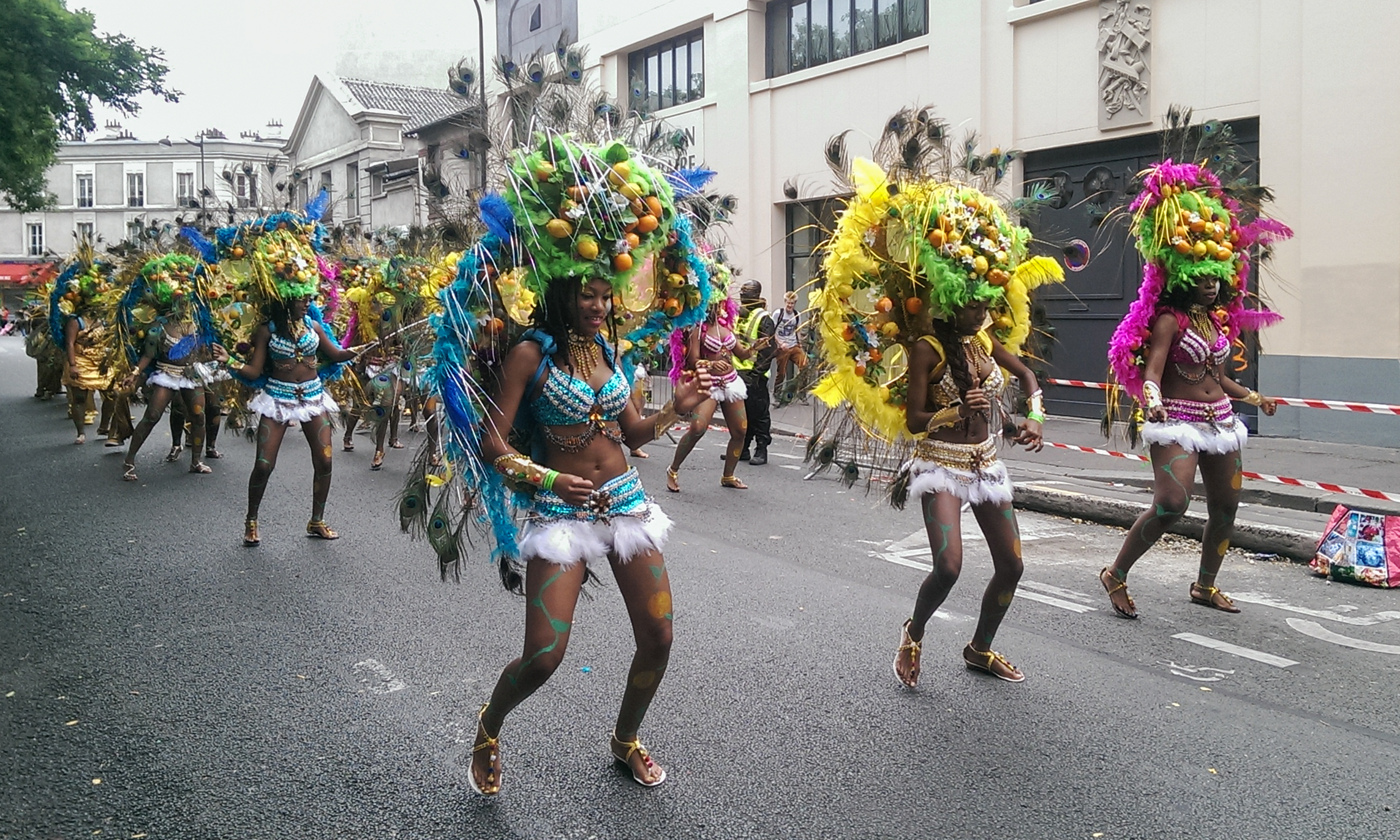
2014 Tropical Carnival of Paris

- Carnaval Antillais de Colombes — every year late June
- Carnaval Tropical de Paris — every year early July
- Carnaval de Montpellier — every year in February
- Carnaval of French West Indies, about two months between the Sunday of Epiphany and Ash Wednesday

=== Germany ===
- Berlin — Karneval der Kulturen (Carnival of Cultures), every year in May (Whitsuntide weekend)
- Bielefeld — Karneval der Kulturen (Carnival of Cultures) every year in June
- Munich — Munich Carnival, every year in June.
- Cologne — Cologne WKNDR, every year in July.

=== The Netherlands ===
- Rotterdam — Zomercarnaval (Summer Carnival) every year in July. Each year there are more than 800.000 visitors.

=== United Kingdom ===
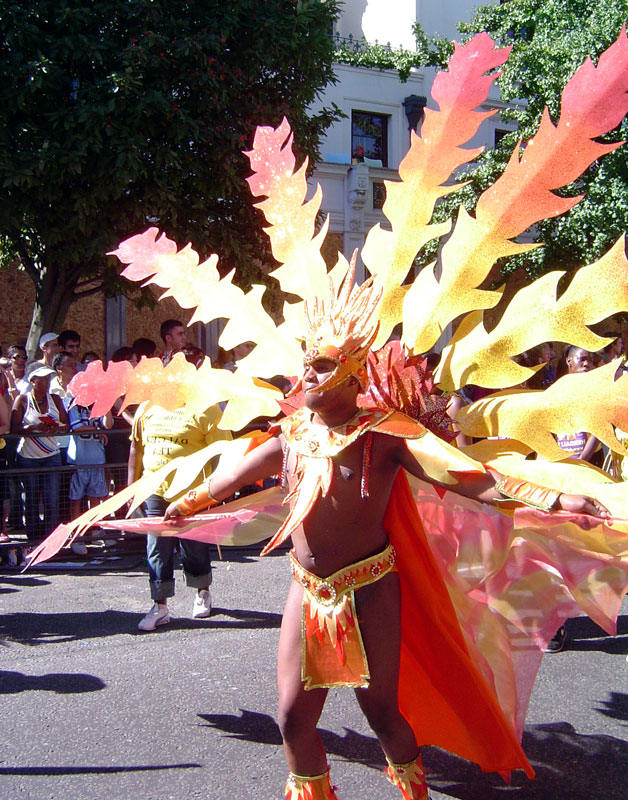
Notting Hill Carnival, London

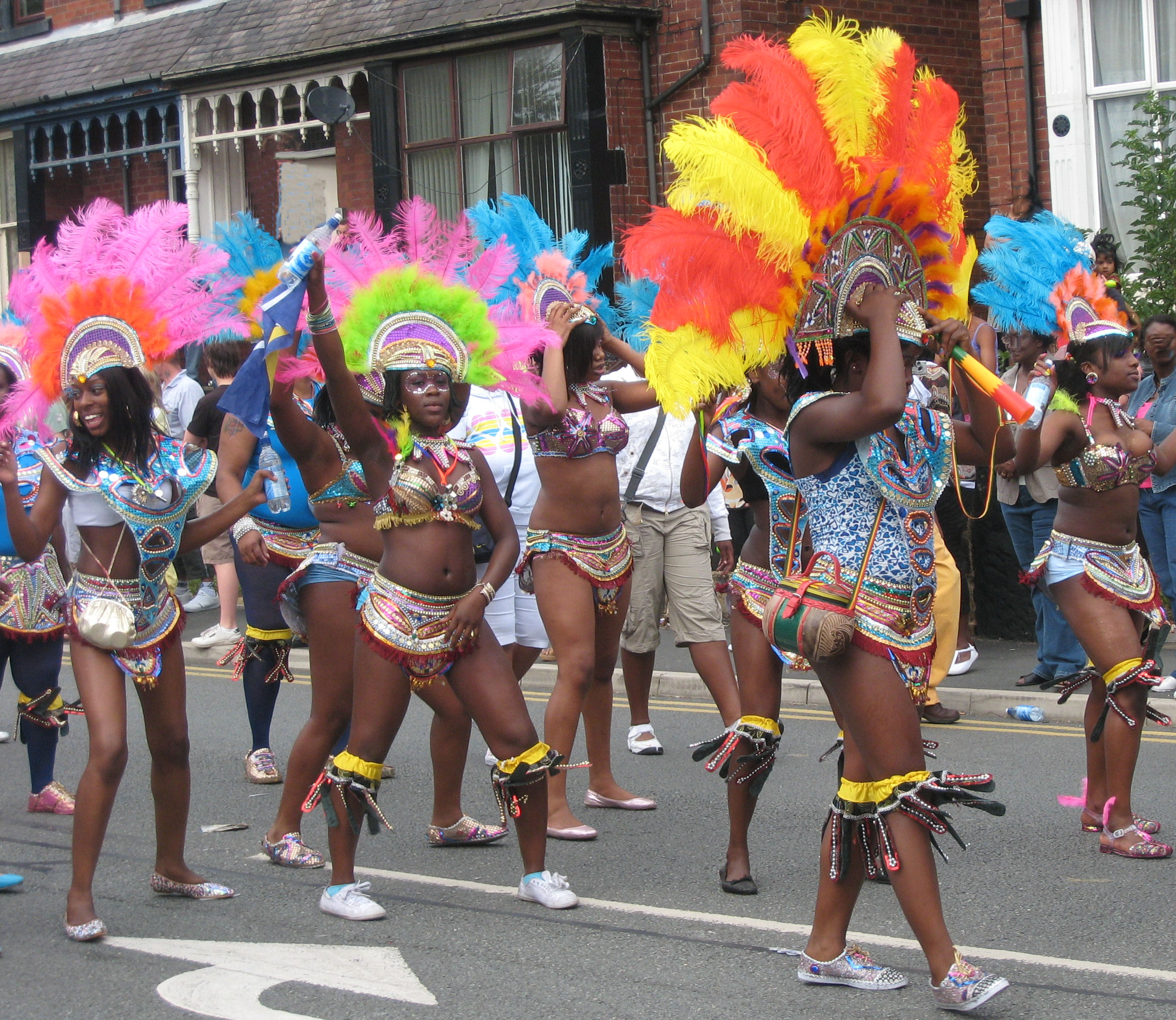
Chapeltown Carnival, Leeds

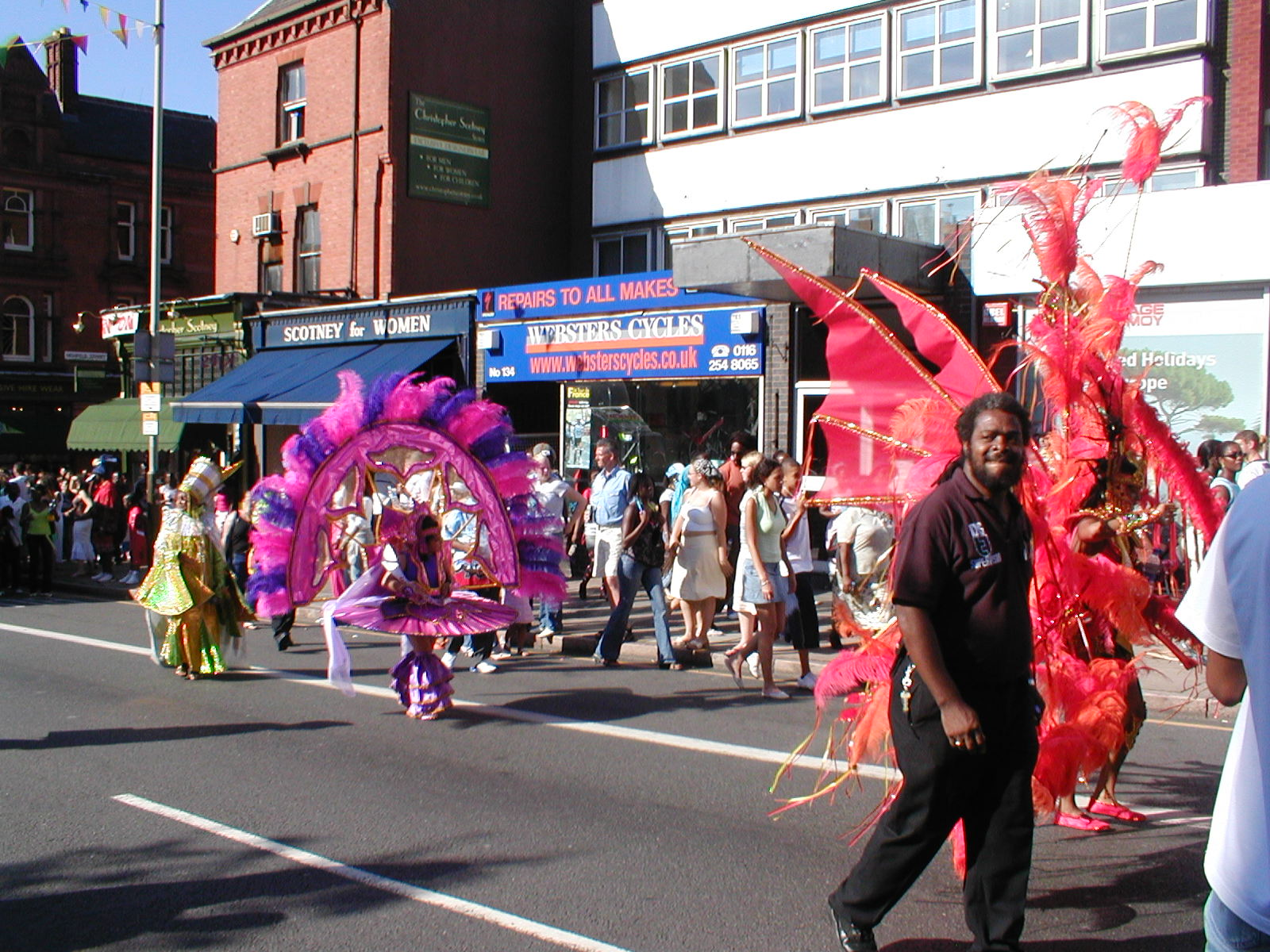
Leicester Caribbean Carnival

- Birmingham — Birmingham International Carnival, Birmingham
- Leicester — Leicester Caribbean Carnival, at Victoria Park, Leicester
- London — Notting Hill Carnival, in Ladbroke Grove, West London; the largest open outdoor event in Europe
- Leeds — Leeds West Indian Carnival, sometimes called Chapeltown Carnival in Leeds; the oldest West Indian Carnival in Europe
- Luton — Luton Carnival
- Manchester — Manchester Caribbean Carnival; the second-oldest Caribbean Carnival in the country, in Alexandra Park, Manchester
- Nottingham – Nottingham Caribbean Carnival, at Victoria Embankment in Nottingham
- Bristol — St Pauls Carnival in Bristol
- Preston — Preston Caribbean Carnival in Preston, Lancashire
- Derby – Derby Caribbean Carnival, at Osmanston Park, Derby

=== United States ===
- Atlanta Carnival Atlanta, Georgia — Last weekend in May, usually falls on Memorial Day weekend
- Austin, Texas — Carnaval Brasileiro, February 3
- Austin, Texas — Austin Summer Carnival, September 26 (FALL EQUINOX) End of Summer Celebration, Last weekend of Summer
- Baltimore, Maryland — Baltimore Caribbean-American Festival, every July in Clifton Park neighborhood in Baltimore.
- Boston, Massachusetts — last Saturday in August, Dorchester, Massachusetts
- Cambridge, Massachusetts — Cambridge Carnival International, Sunday following Labor Day — Held in Kendall Square
- Chicago, Illinois — Windy City Carnival formerly Chicago CARIFETE, third Saturday in August, on the Midway Plaisance in the confines of the University of Chicago Campus. (http://windycitycarnival.com/)
- Dallas Carnival – Typically held the 3rd weekend in September
- Hartford, CT – Established in 1962, the West Indian Independence Celebration carnival parade and free concert takes place the second week of August in downtown Hartford
- Houston, Texas — usually the weekend around Fourth of July. For 2017, the Ultimate Mega Fest (UMF) kicks off the Houston Caribbean festival season with soca, reggae, chutney, and Latin music.
- Jersey City, New Jersey — the fourth Saturday of July from Lincoln Park (Jersey City) parade route leading to the Festival at Exchange Place
- Las Vegas, Nevada — Las Vegas Latin Caribfest —last weekend in October (www.lvcaribfest.com)
- Long Island, New York — weekend after Labor Day Carnival — Held in Hempstead, Nassau County
- Los Angeles, California — Hollywood Carnival, Parade of the Bands, fourth weekend of June
- Madison, Wisconsin — Handphibians Carnaval, every year close to Brazilian Carnaval. February 24/25 in 2017
- Miami Broward Caribbean Carnival Miami, FL — the second weekend in October, Columbus Day weekend
- Minneapolis, Minnesota — CARIFEST — usually held the fourth weekend of July along West River Road right next to the Mississippi River. (www.Carifest.org)

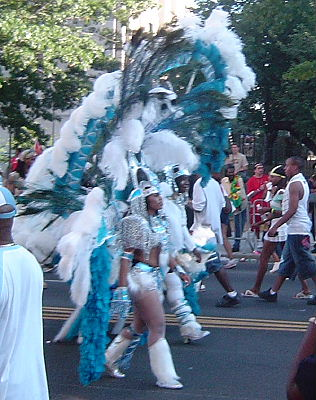
Labor Day Carnival, United States

- New Orleans, Louisiana — in November, the bayou Bacchanal is held on the first Saturday in downtown and Armstrong Park.
- New Orleans, Louisiana — The last full weekend of June, the NOLA Caribbean Festival host seven events in four days, including pre-parties, pool-parties, parades, and a Caribbean festival with music, food and crafts from all over the Caribbean.
- New Orleans, Louisiana — The last full weekend of June, the New Orleans Caribbean Carnival usually held in conjunction with the New Orleans Caribbean Experience, host a series of parties, four events, three days in celebration of the New Orleans Caribbean Carnival 2021
- New York City, New York — Labor Day Carnival — held in the Crown Heights neighborhood of the Brooklyn borough, along Eastern Parkway, with more than 2.3 million visitors annually.
- Philadelphia, Pennsylvania Held on Father's day weekend in the historic Fairmount Park.
- Pittsburgh, Pennsylvania Held on July 24 & July 25 2026 at the Allegheny Commons Park West.

Pittsburgh Caribbean Carnival www.pittsburghcarnival.org

- Orlando, Florida — usually held the last weekend in May, which is typically Memorial Day weekend. Most recently been held at the Citrus Bowl
- Raleigh/Durham, North Carolina CaribMask usually held on the third Saturday in August.
- Rochester, New York - Carifest - held the second weekend and August since 1985
- San Francisco, California — Carnaval San Francisco — last weekend in May, usually falls on Memorial Day weekend
- Seattle, Washington — Umoja Fest in early August.
- Tacoma, Washington — PLU campus Carnival, near Fat Tuesday
- Tampa, Florida — usually held at the beginning of June in St. Petersburg, Florida (Greater Tampa Bay Area), at Vinoy Park. Moved for 2011 to Raymond James Stadium.
- Norfolk, Virginia — Virginia CaribFest(2nd weekend in September)
- Washington, D.C. — DC Caribbean Festival, usually between June 16–24 every year.
- Worcester, Massachusetts — Worcester Caribbean American Carnival, The day after Boston, MA Carnival
- Charleston Carifest, Charleston, South Carolina — usually after Spoleto around the third weekend in June. This carnival celebration is held in honour of Caribbean American Heritage Month.

== See also ==
- Antigua Carnival
- CARIFESTA
- Carnival Road March
- Jamaica Carnival
- J'ouvert
- Kanaval
- List of calypso musicians
- List of chutney musicians
- List of islands in the Caribbean
- List of Trinidad and Tobago Carnival character costumes
- Mardi Gras
- Toronto Caribbean Carnival
- Trinidad Carnival
