= Carlyle Williams =

Canadian visual artist and musician (1946–2021)

- Born: November 26, 1946
- Died: March 27, 2021 (aged 74)
- Genres: pop, calypso, outsider music
- Labels: Eternal Art & Music
- Website: www.carlylewilliams.com

Carlyle Williams was a Canadian musician and visual artist.

== History ==
Carlyle Williams was born in 1946 in Trinidad and Tobago, and later immigrated to Canada. He studied painting and drawing at John Abbott College in Montreal, and later graduated from Concordia University with a Bachelor's Degree with a double major in fine arts and mathematics. While a student at Concordia, Williams was involved in the Sir George Williams affair student protests denouncing institutional racism on campus.

Williams' artistic output spanned several mediums including oil painting on canvas, music, metal sculpting, screen-printing and public performances. His practice was framed in relation to what Williams described as "Eternal Art and Music", influenced in part by Jungian psychology. Williams described his work as "the 'Sum total' of the Past, Present, and Future of Art and Music... created beyond the ' Time-Space' Continuum. This Creativity taps directly into Cosmic Consciousness". Despite Williams' formal training, his artwork, and musical output in particular, was sometimes described as part of the outsider art movement, and drew occasional comparisons to Daniel Johnston.

In 1988, Williams self-released his debut album 'Gotta Go for It!', on which he performed all musical parts. The album drew on styles including pop, classical music, industrial and psychedelia. A music video was produced for The Price, one of the songs on the album. 'Gotta Go for It!' came to be viewed as a unique and ambitious output and was eventually highly regarded by Williams' artistic contemporaries. 'Gotta Go for It!' was described by WeirdCanada as made up of "truly inspiring vocal work" and as an album that "is positive: obsessive self-awareness and accompanying self-criticism can be reality forming".

In the mid 1990s, Williams lived in an artist loft located above seminal Montreal venue the Isart Gallery, and was part of the emerging performing arts community that was involved with the space.

In 1998, Williams released his follow up album 'Life is Fun'. All 22 songs of the album were recorded during a one-day session in July 1998 at Studio Victor in Montreal's iconic Saint Henry neighborhood. For the recording, Williams incorporated other musicians including J.C. Young on backup vocals, John Bardis on percussion and Daniel Lachlan Sturton McKell on bass. Bardis was the former drummer of thrash metal band Eudoxis, while McKell was a member of gospel and bluegrass ensemble Lake of Stew.

As of 2006, Williams was working on a third musical album which was never released.

Williams regularly performed live, including at the annual Caribbean festival Carifiesta and at venues such as the Club Soda (Montreal), and occasionally exhibited his visual art as part of solo and group exhibitions. In 2004, he took part in a group show at Le Gesu. In 2013, his paintings were exhibited as part of a dedicated art show celebrating his work, held at the Ecole des Beaux Arts, during the Pop Montreal festival. His live performance as part of this exhibition was positively received, noted for its uniqueness and enthusiasm.

Williams was an active member of the Quebec Writers Federation and participated in a 2019 public storytelling series supported by the Canada Council for the Arts. As part of 2019 Black History Month, Williams took part in an event organized at la Maison d'Haiti to commemorate the 1968 Congress of Black Writers in Montreal and the 1969 Concordia University student protests.

Carlyle Williams died on March 27, 2021.

== Discography ==
=== Full-length albums ===
- 1988: Gotta Go for It! (Eternal Art & Music)
- 1998: Life is Fun (Eternal Art & Music)

=== EPs ===
- Is it / Shot Down 7" single (Stepenson Recordings)

=== Other contributions ===
- 2013: Black Chicken / Tracey Trance / The Savage Young Taterbug - Power (uncredited contribution)
