= Jessie Waddell =

Founder of the New York City West Indian Day Carnival (1892–1975)

Jessie Waddell soon after her arrival in New York.

Jessie Waddell (1892–1975) was a Trinidadian-American musician and performer. She was the founder of New York City's West Indian Day Parade, a celebration of West Indian culture held annually in Brooklyn.

== Early life ==
Waddell was born in Tunapuna, Trinidad and Tobago, the oldest of seven children. She was a musician from a young age, playing dance music as well as the organ at a local Anglican church. After the death of her father in 1907, she left school to work at the Arima Roman Catholic School.

She immigrated to New York City sometime in 1923 or 1924.

== West Indian Day Parade ==
In New York, Waddell sought to provide a cultural link for Harlem's Caribbean community by hosting Carnival festivities in the form of masquerade balls. From 1924 to 1944, she promoted some of the biggest masquerades at the Renaissance Ballroom. She also led a 10-piece orchestra, the "Nu-Tones", who performed at many of these dances.

In 1946, Waddell wrote to mayor William O'Dwyer about hosting the Carnival parade outdoors on Labor Day, along Seventh Avenue in Harlem. She was the chair of the Trinidad Carnival Pageant Committee of New York, the forerunner of the West Indian American Day Carnival Association, which sponsored the parade. Originally, the event was planned to be exclusively Trinidadian, but pressure from other Caribbean civic organizations and businesses caused Waddell to shift the event to a broader "West Indian Day" celebration. The first Carnival parade took place on September 1, 1947, attended by over 50,000 people and featuring a variety of floats, calypso bands and orchestras, and intricately costumed performers.

Waddell continued to be an important figure in organizing the annual parades and recruiting performers until the Harlem parade permit was revoked in 1964. When the parade was resumed in 1969 along Eastern Parkway in Brooklyn, it was under the leadership of Carlos Lezama.

== Personal life ==
After moving to the US, Waddell married Smithy Young and had two sons. The younger, Courtenay, was killed on Labor Day weekend, 1945, when he fell off the roof of their apartment building. Following her son's death, Waddell became deeply depressed. According to her niece and nephew, Waddell's friends and associates pushed her to host the West Indian Day parade as a means of escaping that depression, and for that reason she decided the parade would fall on Labor Day, the anniversary of Courtenay's death.

Waddell returned to Trinidad in 1972, and remained there until her death in 1975.
