= Jamaica Carnival =

Annual event held mainly in Kingston

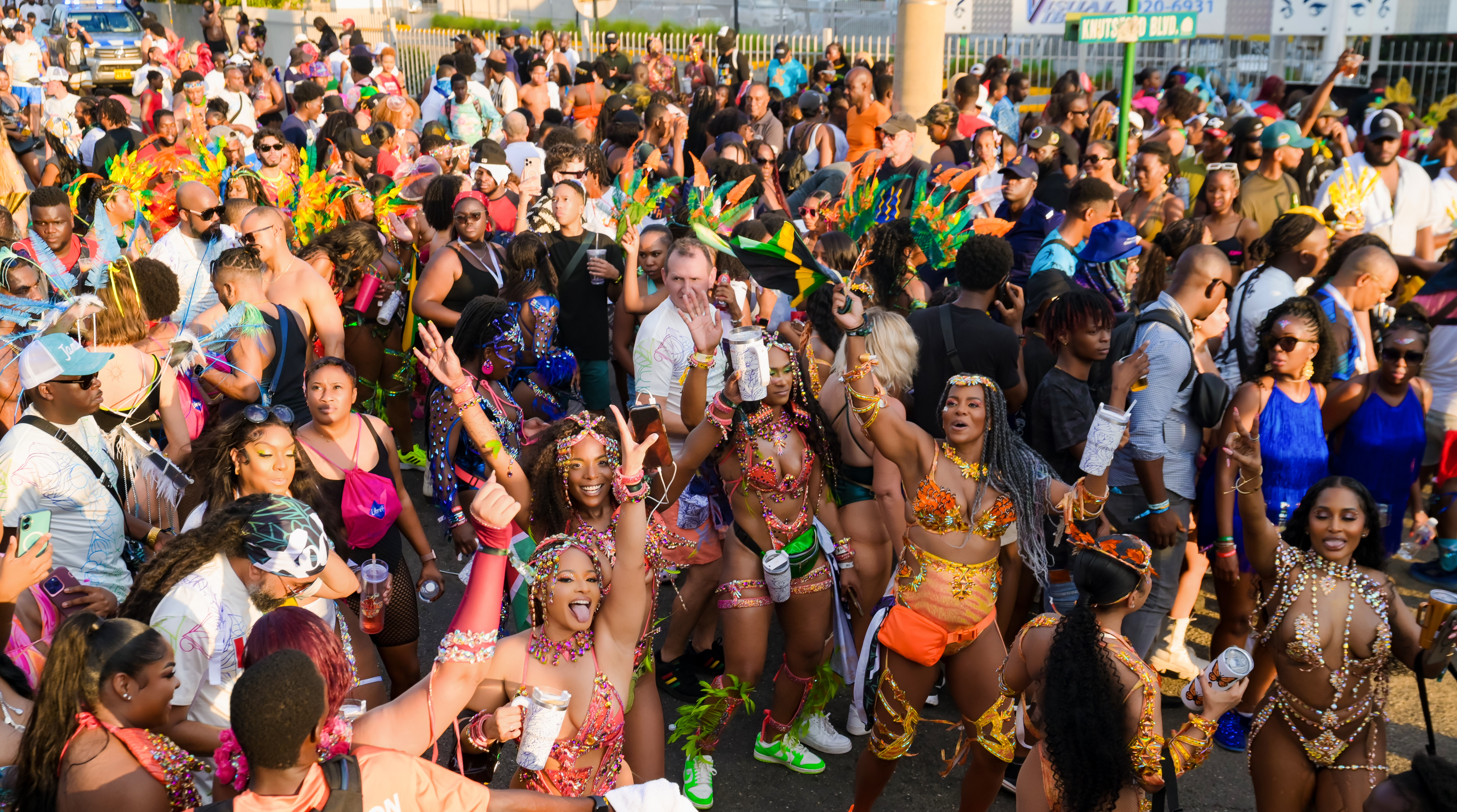
- Masqueraders revelling during the Road March on Carnival Sunday, in Kingston, Jamaica.
- Observed by: Jamaica
- Type: Cultural
- Significance: Celebration a week after Easter
- Celebrations: Costumes, bands, parades, music, dancing and parties
- Date: March / April; Carnival Sunday (Road March)
- Duration: 1 week
- Frequency: Annual
- Related to: Caribbean Carnival, Mardi Gras, Carnival, Shrove Monday, Easter, Lent, Byron Lee and the Dragonaires

Carnival in Jamaica, also referred to as Jamaica Carnival and Bacchanal Jamaica (also the names of Jamaica's longstanding bands), is an annual Caribbean Carnival event held mainly in Kingston, Jamaica, a week after Easter (usually during March or April). The festival is marked by week-long celebrations, fetes and entertainment events, which are a prelude to the official Mas or Road March finale on Carnival Sunday. The Road March is known for its parades of local and international revellers in vibrant costumes, bands, carnival trucks, live performances, dancing and other festivities. Other smaller road marches and carnival events take place in Ocho Rios, Montego Bay and Negril. The event is traditionally associated with calypso music and soca music, however it has since evolved into a unique fusion of dancehall, reggae and soca revelry.

== History ==
=== Origin ===
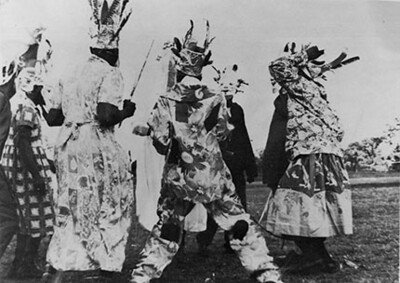
Jamaican burru, a post-emancipation fertility masquerade found mainly in Clarendon, which has similar features to jonkunnu.

The origin of Caribbean carnivals can be traced back to French and Spanish colonialists, who introduced the early Italian Catholic tradition of Shrovetide celebrations to the Americas. In particular, by the late 18th century, French settlers brought carnival to Caribbean islands including Haiti, Martinique, St Lucia, Trinidad et al., as a pre-Lenten Catholic celebration, involving masquerades and balls. Over time, slaves adapted elements of their cultures and indigenous cultures into these European celebrations, which became part of their tradition and evolved with dancing, costumes, songs and particular styles of music.

=== Jamaican carnival culture roots ===
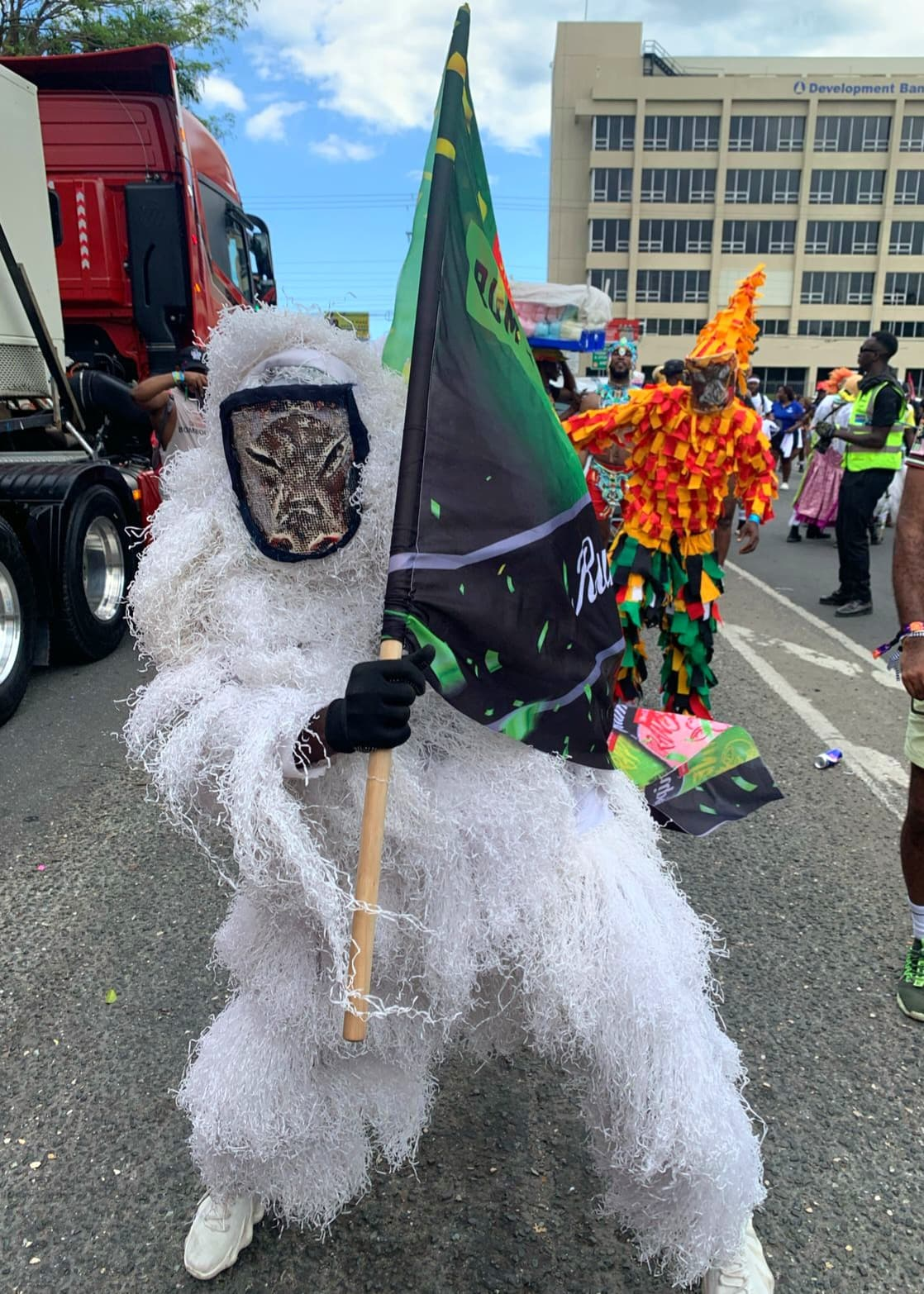
Jamaican jonkonnu characters participating in the Road March on Carnival Sunday.

Jamaica's history of Spanish and British colonialism, contributed colonial era, religious and post-emancipation celebrations, from which some of Jamaica's oldest parades, music and dance forms emerged. These include quadrille, burru and jonkunnu (a Christmastime festival)— all of which also entail masquerades, characters, costumes, music and dancing that depict fusions and adaptations of elements from European and African cultures. Other local Creole folk traditions including mento dance and music (sometimes called mento calypso or Jamaican calypso), which bears similarities to other Greater Antillean folk genres, were often featured at cultural celebrations and festivals. Elements of Jamaican traditions like jonkunnu and mento (music and dance) have spread to other regions, including North America (particularly North Carolina and Miami), The Bahamas, Belize and other parts of the Caribbean— thus, influencing international Caribbean carnivals like Caribana in Canada.

=== UWI Carnival ===
With the opening of the University of the West Indies, Mona, in the late 1940s, carnival culture from the Eastern Caribbean spread to Jamaica. This was due to the migration of Eastern Caribbean students, who recreated their celebrations on the university's campus, bringing steel pan music and organizing costume bands— a tradition that became popular in the mid-1950s, which continues on the campus to date.

In the early years, the Halls of Residence became the focus for carnival activities, with some halls having steel bands, and costume bands being key aspects of carnival for the halls. Hall residents started creating individual or group costumes independently. In the mid-1980s, a special hall committee decided the themes and sections for the halls’ bands, and organized the costume-making.

Events included Carnival Queen Show on Friday night, Ole Mas (masquerading) on Saturday morning, and the road march of costume bands on Saturday afternoon, in the Mona Heights and Ring Road vicinities. By the 1980s and early 90s, the carnival expanded to more than a week, including events such as Poolside Lyme, Reggae/Calypso Show, Costume Show and Firs’ Lap, where the parading and judging took place. This was followed by an Out-of-Town Lime, with the carnival ending on Shrove Tuesday with a Las’ Lap finale. Currently, UWI Carnival takes place around mid to late March, and includes Integration fete, J’ouvert, Ring Road and Beach Party.

=== Jamaica Carnival's inception and founder, Byron Lee ===
Around 1950, Byron Lee and the Dragonaires, a Jamaican ska and calypso band was formed. They are considered pioneers who popularized Caribbean music and carnival culture— with Byron Lee being considered the Father of Jamaica Carnival.

The band originally played mento, then ska which garnered international success, but they later included calypso and soca. They started touring Trinidad and Tobago in the early 1960s, working with Mighty Sparrow. The band played at Trinidad and Tobago Carnival for the first time in 1974, and released the album, Carnival in Trinidad. Throughout the 1970s, they recorded both reggae and carnival music, and by 1979, their focus shifted to calypso, soca and mas. The band performed at Trinidad's carnival and toured the Caribbean frequently. In the 1980s, carnival parties and bands (Frenchmen, Orange Carnival and Grapefruit Carnival) gained popularity in uptown Kingston. Byron Lee planned to bring a similar Eastern Caribbean carnival atmosphere to Jamaica, and in 1989 he announced the advent of Jamaica Carnival.

On Sunday, April 22, 1990, Jamaica Carnival's inaugural staging took place, which was held in the Constant Spring Road/Half-Way-Tree area. Despite predictions of failure, the carnival drew hundreds of thousands of attendees— successfully uniting Jamaicans of different social classes. It entailed a week of activities from April 14–22, and has since turned into an annual event which used to be televised live on local channels. The band consistently performed at Jamaica Carnival throughout the 1990s, and created the ragga-soca genre. Lee continued to play an active role in the island's carnival scene until his passing in 2008.

==== Kiddies Carnival ====
Along with numerous fetes, pan night, the display of Carnival Kings and Queens, the calypso tent, road march and other festivities, the carnival also featured Kiddies Carnival— a version of carnival which entailed children masqueraders in colourful costumes. Within the last two decades, Kiddies Carnival gradually phased out.

== Carnival bands ==
The oldest local carnival bands are Jamaica Carnival and Bacchanal Jamaica, which date back to 1989. However, Orange Carnival predates them— a prominent band which was created in 1976 by a small group of upper-class Jamaicans, who contributed to the development of Jamaica's carnival culture in the 1980s. In 2000, Bacchanal Jamaica was formed when the Oakridge Boys (Michael Ammar Jr, Ricky Mahfood and George Hugh, also pioneers of carnival in Jamaica) merged with Revellers (a carnival band in Jamaica since 1994) and Raiders (J'ouvert promoters since 1995).

According to Michael Ammar Jr, founder and CEO of Bacchanal Jamaica, "Bacchanal Carnival and Jamaica Carnival, in some ways, catered to different audiences, so between both of us we serviced most of the market. While we are mostly in Kingston, Jamaica Carnival would go to Negril and MoBay and Chukka Cove (St Ann)". Subsequently, Jamaica Carnival came together with Bacchanal Jamaica.

Other carnival bands which have emerged since the revival of carnival in the late 2010s, include Xodus Carnival, Xaymaca International, Ocho Rios Carnival, Yard Mas and GenXS. In 2022, Bacchanal Jamaica and Xodus Carnival, the biggest mas bands, forged a partnership.

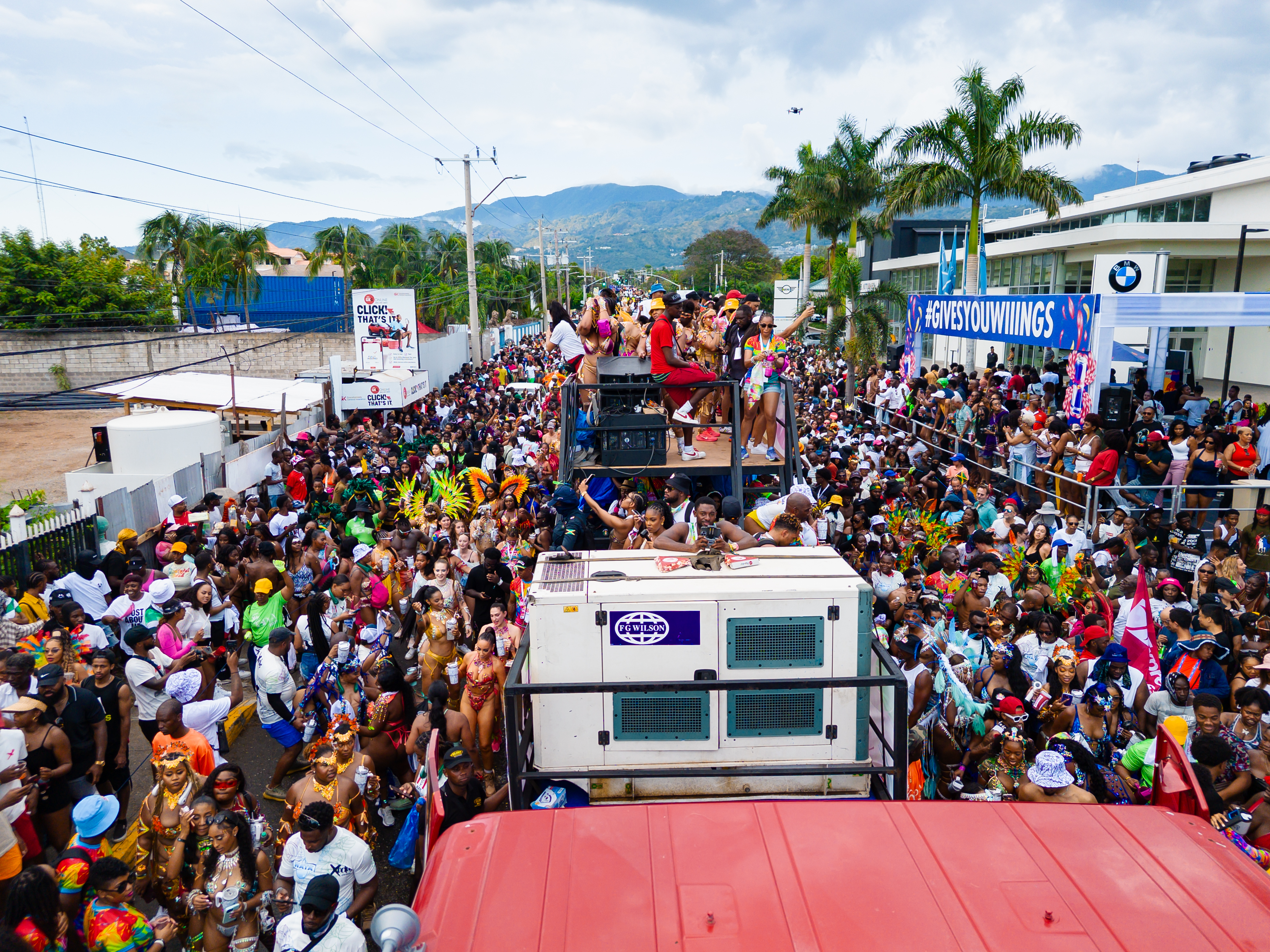
Carnival trucks and revellers on Carnival Sunday, in Kingston, Jamaica.

== Carnival dates ==
The table shows a list of Jamaica Carnival dates from 2009 to 2026.

Calendar Year	Carnival Sunday/Bacchanal Jamaica Road March
2009	April 19
2010	April 11
2011	May 1
2012	April 15
2013	April 7
2014	April 27
2015	April 12
2016	April 3
2017	April 23
2018	April 8
2019	April 28
2020	Postponed to October due to the COVID-19 pandemic, but was eventually cancelled.
2021	Cancelled due to the COVID-19 pandemic.
2022	July 10
2023	April 16
2024	April 7
2025	April 27
2026	April 12

== Celebrations and events ==
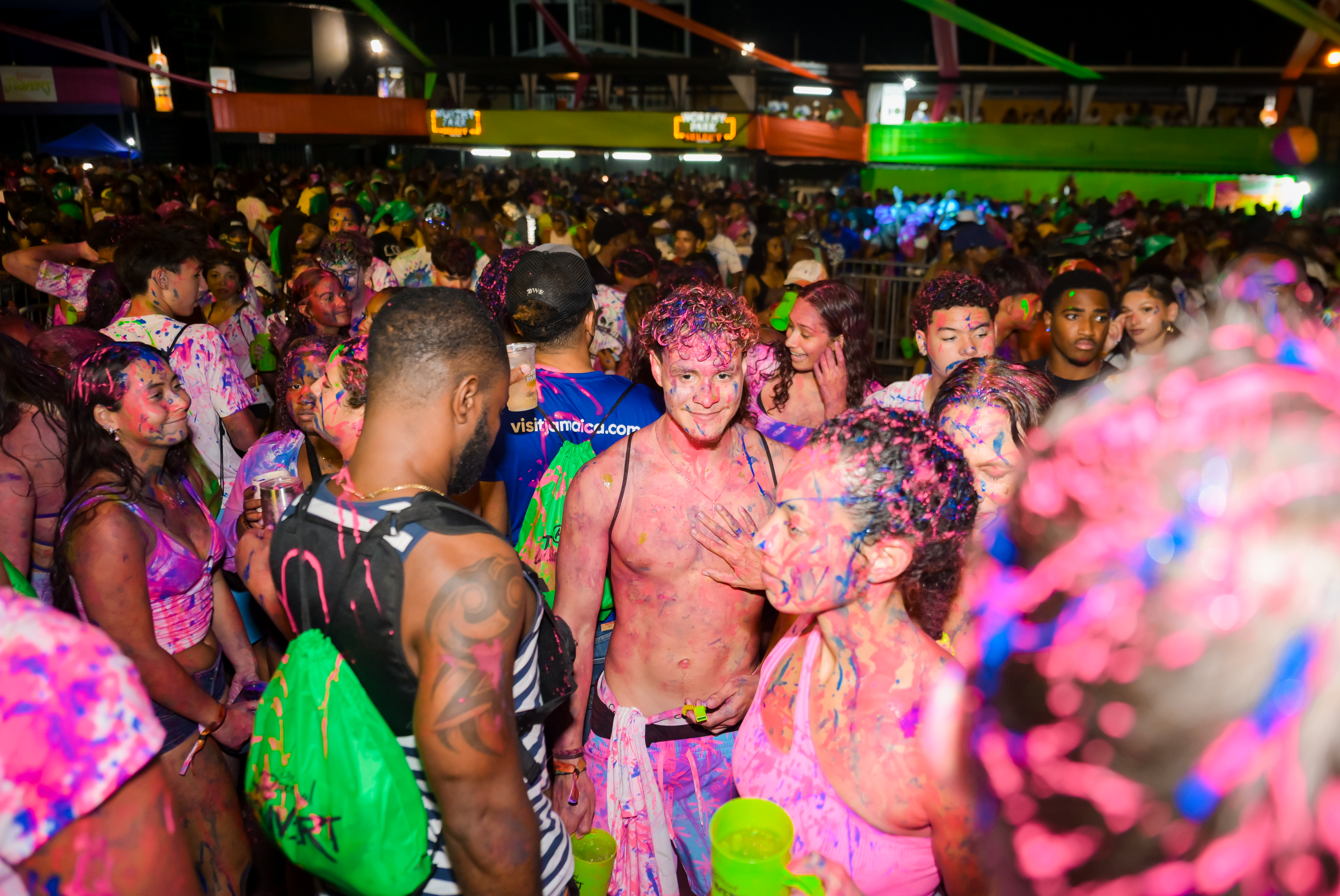
One of several J'ouvert events, in Jamaica— before the Road March.

Carnival in Jamaica celebrations kick off with a host of festivities, fetes and events which take place over several weeks, leading up to the Road March on Carnival Sunday. Many locals and international visitors (including celebrities) participate in the festivities. Jamaica's carnival calendar includes all-inclusive parties, galas, costume launch and band events, breakfast and brunch parties, cooler fetes, various J'ouvert fetes, beach parties including beach J'ouvert, boat parties like soca cruises, live events with performances by soca and calypso bands/singers from other islands, a series of pre-carnival soca fitness events and post-carnival parties. Several spin-off carnival events including road marches are held in Ochos Rios, Montego Bay, Negril and St Thomas.

The Road March, the main event, is a grand masquerade in the streets of Kingston, consisting of carnival bands, revellers in flamboyant themed costumes according to their bands sections, singing and dancing to music (dancehall, reggae, soca and calypso) from carnival trucks and floats, live entertainment from soca and calypso musicians, drinking and eating. Along the carnival routes, onlookers also attend to observe the Mas.

== See also ==
- Carnival
- Mento
- Jonkonnu
- Bacchanalia
- Labor Day Carnival
- New Orleans Mardi Gras
- List of Caribbean carnivals around the world
