= Leicester Caribbean Carnival =

Coordinates: 52.6236°N 1.1190°W

Leicester Caribbean Carnival is an annual event, held in early August in Leicester, England.

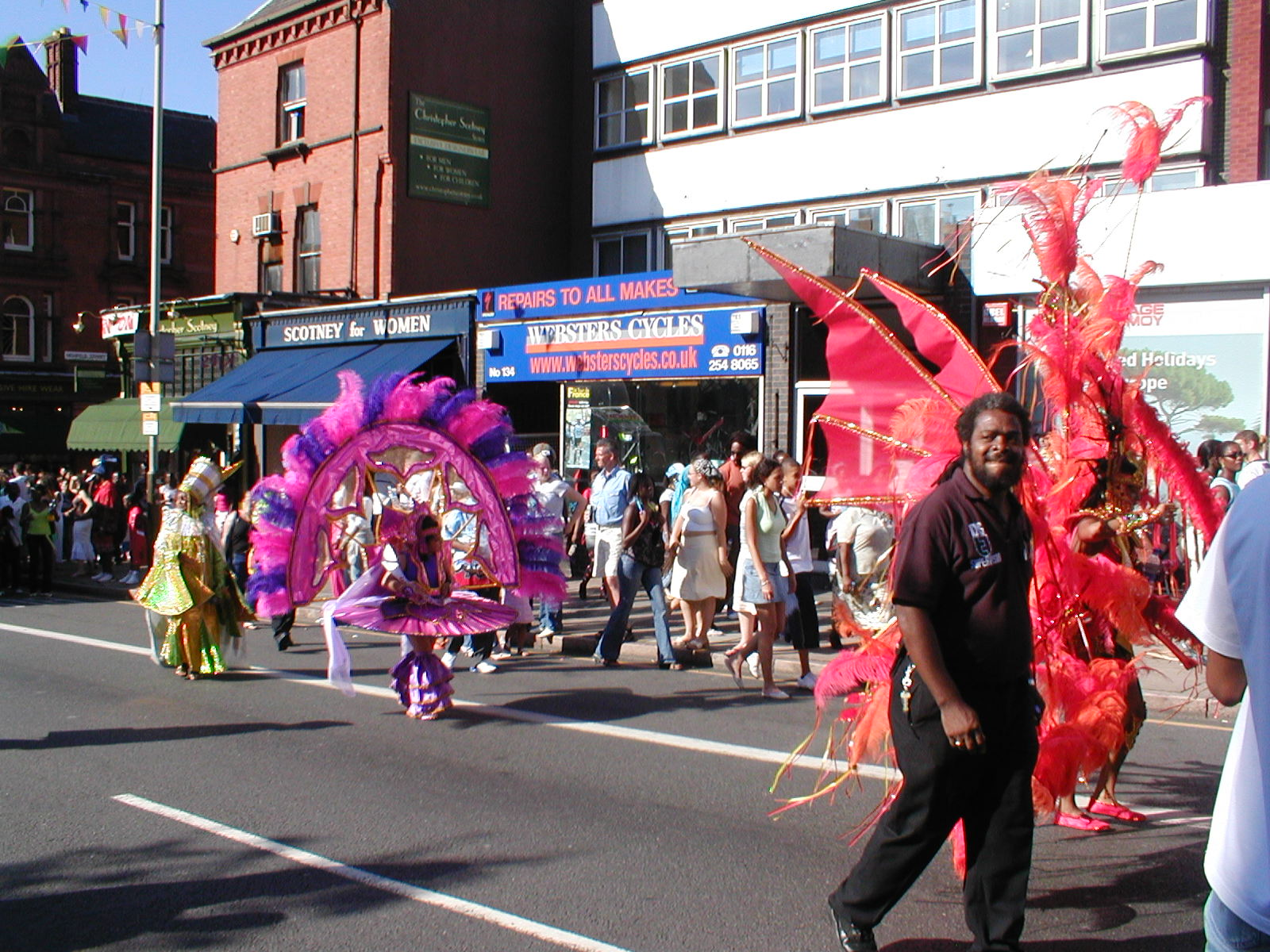
The carnival procession on London Road, 2004

The community-organised carnival has been held annually since 1985 (with the exception of 2006) on the first Saturday in August, with a parade around the city of Leicester (usually taking in the city centre and the suburb of Highfields), culminating in an event on Victoria Park. The parade is usually preceded by a week of cultural events. It is the third-largest Caribbean carnival in the UK, after the Leeds and Notting Hill carnivals.

The 2006 festival did not take place due to a lack of funding. It returned in 2007.

== See also ==
- Caribbean Carnival
- British African-Caribbean community
