= Carifiesta =

Annual Caribbean carnival in Montreal, Canada

- Formation: 1974
- Type: Cultural festival
- Legal status: Active, non-profit
- Purpose: Celebration of Caribbean heritage
- Headquarters: Montreal, Quebec, Canada
- Official language: English, French
- Parent organization: Caribbean Cultural Festivities Association
- Budget: $35,000
- Volunteers: 1
- Website: Carifiesta

Carifiesta (not to be confused with Carifesta) (French: Carifête) is an annual Caribbean Carnival held in Montreal, Quebec, Canada. It was established in 1974, and is held in July. The parade was cancelled in the 1990s due to conflict and firearm-related crime. As the situation progressed most of the participants moved to Toronto Caribana. In 2010 the parade was called off due to a legal battle between promoters Henry Antoine and Everiste Blaize, the city of Montreal. This resulted in many groups pulling out and a struggle to maintain a street parade. The organization put in place in 2019 a new liaison: Jason Forbes, who resigned in 2021 because of profit and organization issues. In 2023 The parade was cancelled. The city of Montreal denied funding the parade. The event is coordinated by the Caribbean Cultural Festivities Association, a nonprofit organization. Carifiesta was established prior to some Carnivals that take place in the Caribbean, for example, Cayman Carnival Batabano. Carifiesta has also been named the largest North-American running Caribbean Street Parade.

Carifiesta does not celebrate any singular Caribbean culture, rather it is meant to celebrate them all coming together. It features culture, music, art, and carnival costumes. Many Caribbean people or people of Caribbean descent find that Carifiesta is a way for them to celebrate their heritage away from home.

== Events ==
=== Parade ===
The main feature of the carnival is a parade along Saint-Catherine Street with people representing various countries in the Caribbean. Flatbed trucks carry disk jockeys playing turntables. Soca music and calypso music are played on speakers. The participants in the parade, dressed in colorful costumes, wave flags, blow whistles, and dance.

=== Junior Parade ===
A Carifiesta junior carnival, for children aged 2 to 16, is held one week prior to the main parade, and is intended to introduce children to Caribbean culture. The day after the main parade is the Carifiesta Cooldown, held at Parc Jean-Drapeau, which is a family-oriented event featuring performances by local and international guest artists. 2017 was the 5th year that the junior carnival took place. The parade officially begins at noon, at the Bill Durnan arena, and ends at Van Horne Park.

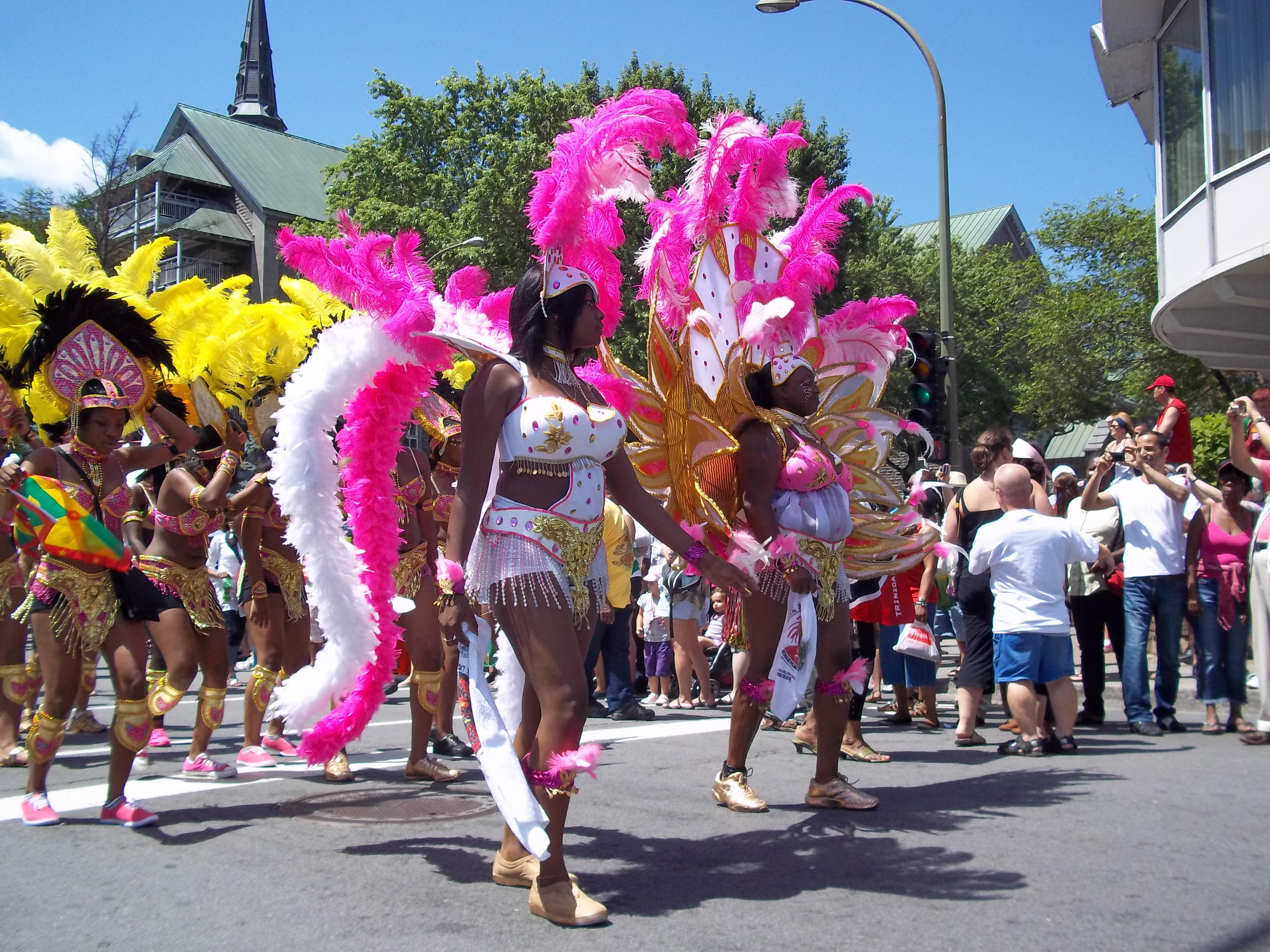
2011 Carifiesta parade at the corner of René Lévesque Boulevard and Guy Street.

== Costumes ==
The costumes worn at Carifiesta are similar to those of other Caribbean Carnival celebrations. They are designed to show a lot of skin and feature bright colors, beading, and exotic headdresses. Women will typically be seen in bikini-style outfits, covered in gems, beads, and sequins, and adorned with feathered headdresses to match. Male costumes consist of decorated, and colorful shorts, paired with beaded neck pieces. Costumes at Carifiesta vary from the typically skin-bearing costumes, some people will wear costumes with a more obvious theme that will offer more coverage. Some dress in apparel that comes from the era in which their ancestors were enslaved, to call attention to their heritage. Since 2014 there have been more carnival bands doing Jab covering their bodies in oil, mud, paint, ink similar to J'ouvert-style costuming.

== History ==
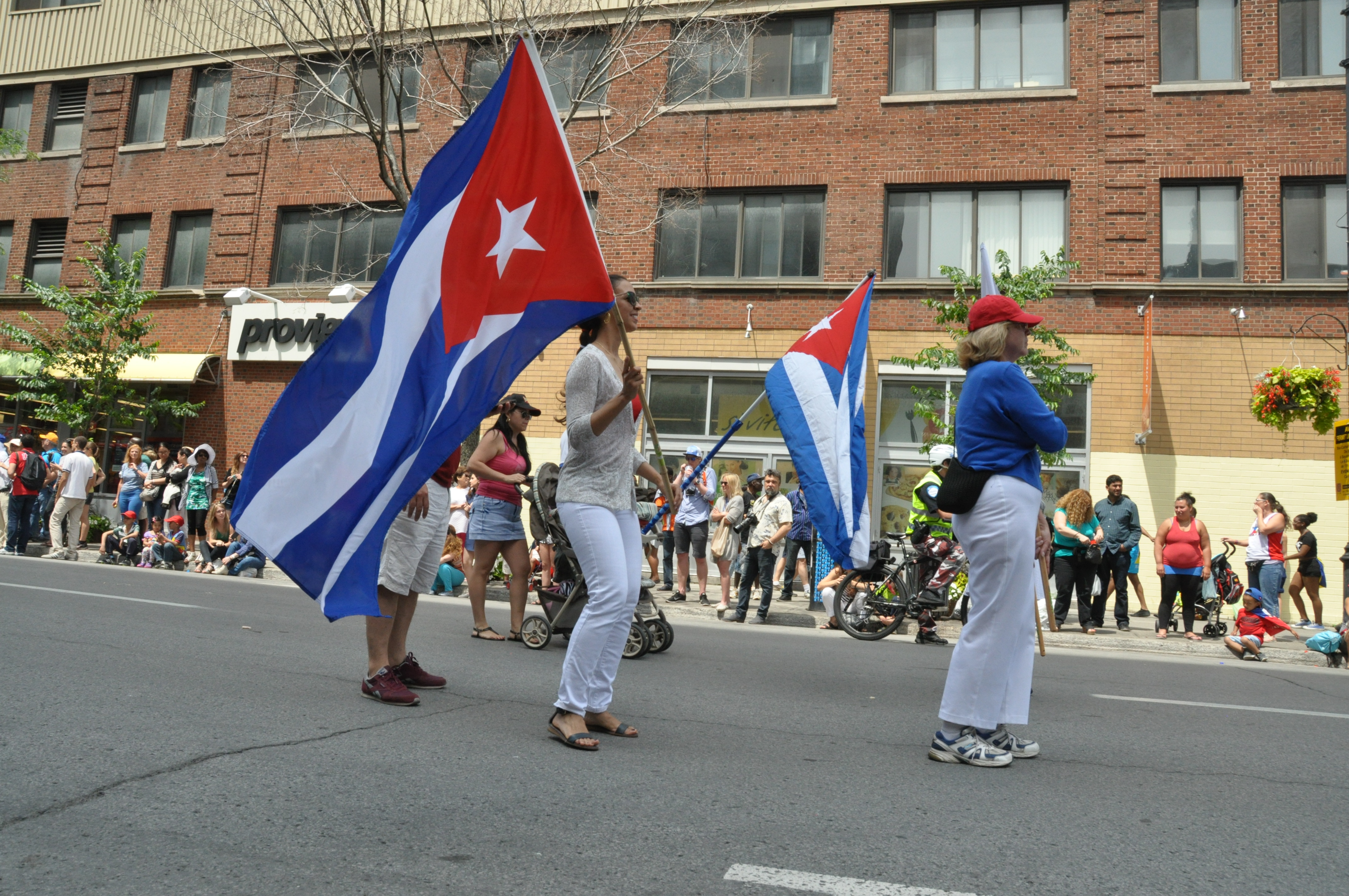

In 1995 the parade was cancelled due conflict and gun shootings. In 2010 the parade was cancelled due to conflict, as Henry Antoine and Everiste Blaize disputed how and by whom the parade should be organized. The two promoters were not able to resolve their differences and work together. Several years later they were still unable to come to terms. In 2013 Blaize was again in conflict. The issue escalated when partners where not happy with CCFA. In 2016 the parade went on with less than 100 participants in costume and less than 10 floats also the organization is financially unstable. The election of Jason Forbes took place in 2018 and he struggled and worked extremely hard to bring to community together. But it was too late with the beginning of the COVID pandemic Jason Forbes announced his resignation on June 1 2021.

== See also ==
- Caribana
