= Cambridge Carnival International =

Cambridge Carnival International is an annual festival held in Cambridge, Massachusetts that celebrates music, food, and other aspects of African and Caribbean cultures. The 30th festival in the series was held in September 2024.

The 2019 carnival was canceled due to fears of gun violence. The following year, the festival was held virtually because of the COVID-19 pandemic.

== See also ==
- List of Caribbean carnivals around the world
