= West Indian Day Parade =

Parade in New York City

Labor Day Carnival
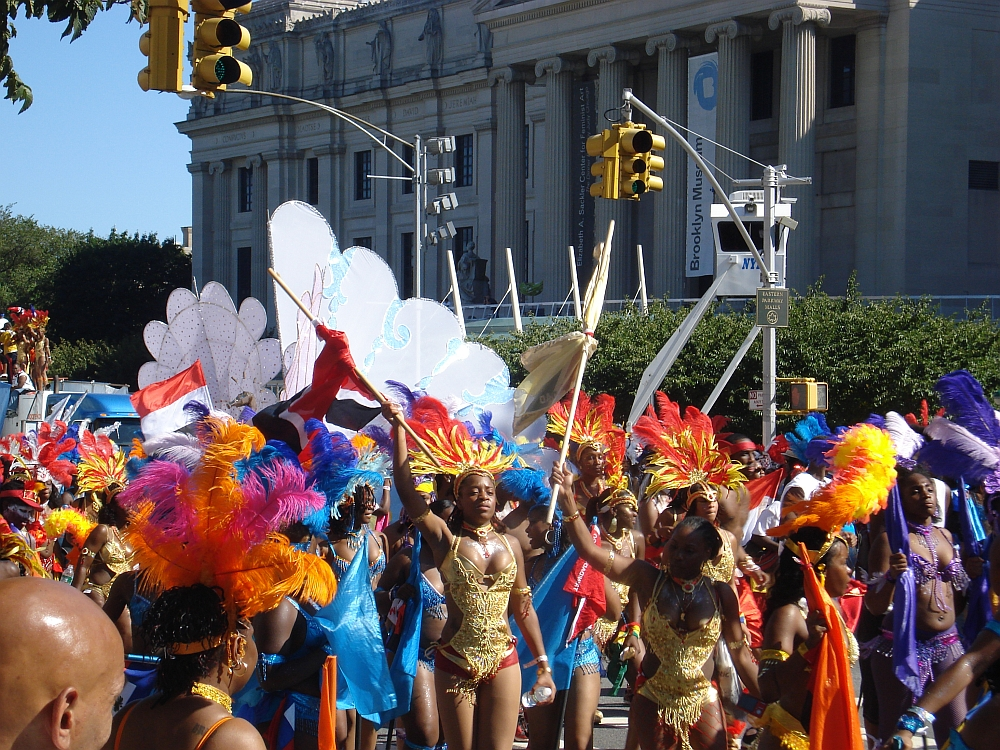
- The West Indian Day Parade marching by the Brooklyn Museum
- Dates: Labor Day
- Years active: 1930s–present
- Website: https://wiadcacarnival.org/

The West Indian Day Parade Carnival is an annual celebration of West Indian culture, held on or around the first Monday of September in the Crown Heights neighborhood of Brooklyn in New York City. It is organized by the West Indian American Day Carnival Association (WIADCA).

The main event is the West Indian Day Parade (also known as simply the Labor Day Parade), which attracts between one and three million participants. The spectators and participators watch and follow the parade on its route along Eastern Parkway. Some of the West Indian or Caribbean islands represented in the parade include Trinidad and Tobago, Haiti, Barbados, Dominica, Saint Lucia, Jamaica, Saint Vincent and Grenada, along with some Afro-Panamanians. Mainland Caribbean countries such as Guyana, Suriname, and Belize also participate as well.

== History ==
=== Start in Harlem ===
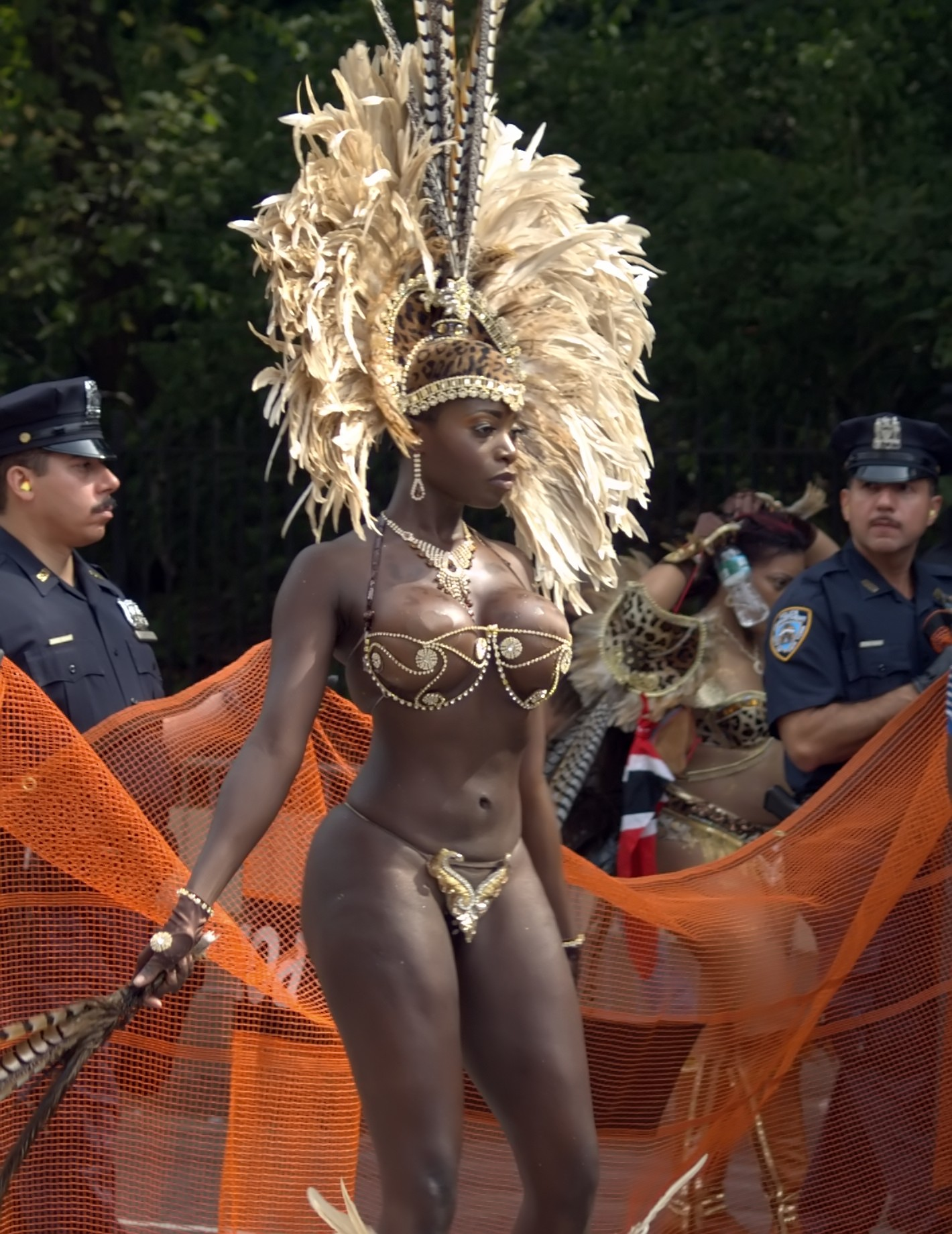
Woman in costume in the 2009 New York City parade.

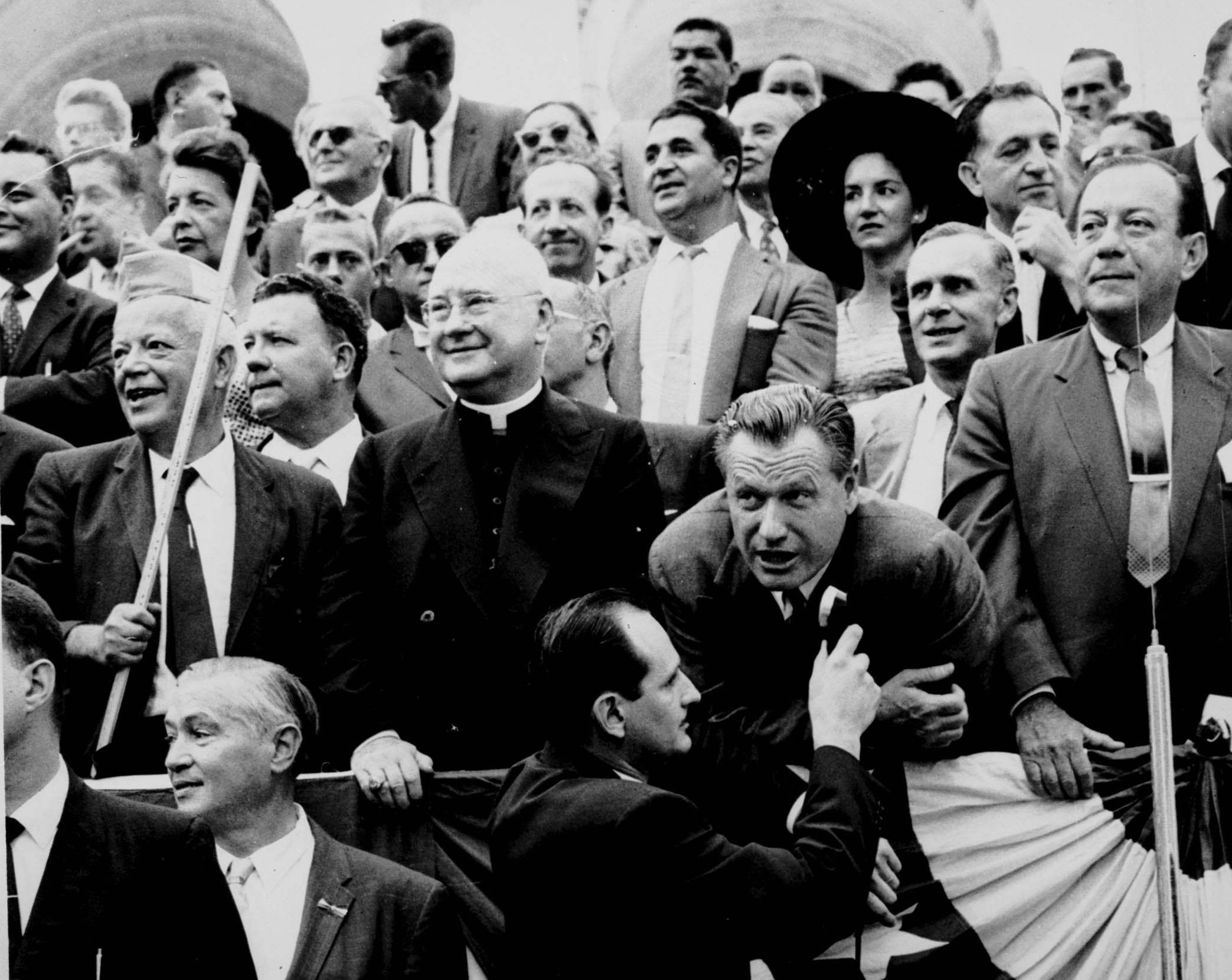
David Dubinsky, Nelson Rockefeller, and Robert F. Wagner Jr. watch the 1959 Labor Day Parade

Jessie Waddell and some of her West Indian friends started the Carnival in Harlem in Upper Manhattan, New York City, in the 1930s by staging costume parties in large, enclosed places such as the Savoy, Renaissance and Audubon Ballrooms due to the cold wintry weather of February. This is the usual time for the pre-Lenten celebrations of the Trinidad and Tobago Carnival and other related celebrations around the world. However, because of the very nature of Carnival, and the need to parade in costume to music, indoor confinement did not work well.

The earliest known Carnival street parade was held on September 1, 1947. The Trinidad Carnival Pageant Committee was the founding force behind the parade, which was held in Harlem. The parade route was along Seventh Avenue, starting at 110th St.

The first Carnival Queen was Dorothy Godfrey. The Committee raised money to finance the parade. They sold advertisement space and boosters, that were printed in a Souvenir Journal for West Indies Day, a booklet which is a memento of that first parade. Jessie Waddell Compton is presented in the journal as the person "whose inspiration and enterprise" was owed to the formation of this committee. The committee consisted of Waddell Compton (Chairman), Ivan H. Daniel (Vice Chairman), Conrad Matthews (Treasurer), Roy Huggins (Secretary), and Robert J. Welsh (Assistant Secretary). Each member of the committee contributed in helping to organize the parade. The after-parade party, which the Trinidad Carnival Pageant Committee held at the Golden Gate Ballroom, was arranged by James M. Green, another figure who helped make the first Carnival Parade in Harlem successful.

=== Move to Crown Heights ===
The permit for the Harlem parade was revoked in 1964. Five years later, a committee headed by Carlos Lezama, which eventually became the West Indian-American Day Carnival Association, obtained approval for the parade to be established on Eastern Parkway in Brooklyn, where it remains today.

Throughout the 1970s groups of colorfully clad masqueraders (“mas bands”) “wined” (danced) down the Parkway to the music of Trinidad-style steel bands (steelpan). Those steel bands were eventually replaced by powerful, truck-mounted sound systems that played a variety of Caribbean musics including calypso, soca (soul/calypso), reggae, and compas.

In 2020, the parade was cancelled due to COVID-19 by order of Mayor of New York Bill de Blasio, who canceled all permits for large-scale events through September 2020. The parade was replaced by a virtual event. While the parade did plan to return for 2021, on August 18 that year the WIADCA announced that the parade itself would once again be cancelled due to COVID-19 uncertainties, but that it would still hold a mix of in-person and streaming events, including several being held at the Brooklyn Museum.

== In popular culture ==
Many calypso and soca songs from Trinidad make reference to the Labor Day Carnival, including "Gun Play in de Parkway" by Calypso Rose, "Melee (on the Eastern Parkway)" by Maestro, Labor Day Jam by the Guyanese superstar, Slingshot, and "Labor Day in Brooklyn" by the Mighty Sparrow.

Jay-Z mentions the Labor Day Carnival on his hit song "Empire State of Mind" (2009), when he says "3 dice Cee-lo, 3 card monte, Labor Day Parade, rest in peace Bob Marley". There are also popular Haitian bands with their powerful méringue-compas music on the parkway, such as T-Vice, Tabou Combo, Konpa Kreyol/Kreyol La, Sweet Micky, Phantoms, Carimi, Djakout, D.P. Express and many more popular bands.

== Incidents ==
A string of fatal and non-fatal shootings and stabbings has occurred on and near the parade route in recent years, both during and following the parade.

In 2003, a man was fatally shot and another was stabbed in the neck. In 2005, one man was shot and killed along the parade route. In 2006, one man was shot and another was stabbed. At the 2007 parade, there was only one official report of violence, when a man was shot twice in the leg. However, a different man (named Nathaniel Smith) was shot and killed in the 2007 parade. In 2011 pre-dawn marches took a violent turn with the murder of one person, five instances of gunshot victims and three instances of stabbings coupled with sporadic shooting at crowds of people.

Following the 2011 parade, Yolanda Lezama-Clark, The President of the West Indian American Day Carnival Association (WIADCA) and other New York City officials condemned the one or two incidents that took place at the parade.

Additionally during the 2011 West Indian Day Parade in Brooklyn, New York City councilman Jumaane Williams along with a few others were arrested for walking along a closed-off sidewalk, after stating he had received permission to do so from other officers.

Several violent incidents took place after the official end of the 2012 parade. In separate incidents, two people were fatally stabbed, and two others were shot. In 2013, two men were murdered and a further three individuals were wounded in several shootings.

On September 7, 2015, a pre-parade J'ouvert celebration was marred by violence when, at 3:41 a.m., gunfire hit lawyer Carey Gabay in the head. Gabay was an aide to New York Governor Andrew Cuomo and first deputy counsel at Empire State Development Corporation. Gabay died nine days later. The shooting was one of several violent episodes, including a fatal stabbing, in the hours before the parade.

On September 5, 2016, during pre-parade celebrations, two people were shot and killed and five others wounded in attacks. The attacks occurred despite the NYPD doubling the number of officers patrolling the neighborhood, installing 42 new security cameras and erecting 200 light towers. Police also distributed fliers, in conjunction with community groups, with a blunt message: "This community will no longer tolerate this violence. Do not shoot anyone. Do not stab anyone."

On September 4, 2023, one male accidentally shot himself at Eastern Parkway and Franklin Avenue. In another incident, one male was shot and two stabbed and slashed during a fight at 1187 Eastern Parkway.

On September 2, 2024, a mass shooting occurred when a lone gunman jumped onto a street divider and fired into the crowd, striking four women and a man. The victims were aged between 16-69 years old. A 25-year-old later died from their injuries, and two others were critically injured.

On September 1, 2025, six people were shot and injured in separate incidents across four locations in Crown Heights. The first incident was reported around 5:30 p.m. while there was still large crowds in the street after the parade was over. A woman was grazed and a man was shot. The second incident was reported at 6:46 p.m. with two men being shot. Both were listed in stable condition. Minutes later at around 6:55 p.m., a 53-year-old man was shot in the neck and leg and a 40-year-old woman was shot in the ankle outside Yard Pot Restaurant and Bakery. The man was critically injured while the woman was reported to be in stable condition. A person of interest was taken into custody. A man was also injured in a slashing and sustained multiple injuries but refused medical attention and was uncooperative with investigators.

== See also ==
- Caribbean Carnival
- Culturama, Nevis
- J'ouvert
- Jamaica Carnival
- Kanaval, Haiti
- Scotiabank Caribbean Carnival Toronto
- Trinidad and Tobago Carnival
- Notting Hill Carnival, London
