= Dame Lorraine =

Trinidadian Carnival character

Dame Lorraine or Dame Lorraine (Trinidad and Tobago) Trinidad, is a historical Trinidadian Carnival character.

== History ==
Her origins and identity can be traced back to colonial times in Trinidad and Tobago in the 18th and early 19th century, emerging from colonial French Masques. Historically, Dame Lorraine masquerades featured a diverse array of performers, including not only liberated slaves and women but also cross-dressing men. The character has been associated with the performances of comedy, found to be mocking both the former French colonists and their ways along with satirizing the French plantation wives.

She is part of a collective group of other "Ole Mas", also known as traditional mass characters. The characters in traditional mas were meant to interact closely with spectators. Masqueraders of Dame Lorraine would take part in elaborate skits and parodies of the early French planters. These activities would take place during the event of Dimanche Gras. The names of each character, including Dame Lorraine, were in French Creole. These included Ma Gwo Bunda (Madame Big Bottom) and Ma Gros Tete (Madame Big Breasts). Dame Lorraine would become a part of Carnival processions as early as 1884. Dame Lorraine has been associated with the performances of comedy, found to be mocking former French colonists and satirizing the colonial French plantation wives.

== Characterization ==
Many of the attributes of Dame Lorraine are from colonial European influences. She is often depicted as a large woman, having an overexaggerated bust and rear, along with wearing brightly coloured ankle length, sometimes floral printed, dresses. Previously, the dresses would be made out materials that were found, including rags. Sometimes as well this included a pregnant belly. These were meant to hint at impure morals. She is also found adorning items such as a mask to partially covers their face, a fan, and embellishments and accessories such as hats, fans, and jewelry. As of Today, she is predominantly depicted by women.
