= Bermuda Carnival =

Carnival Event

Bermuda Carnival is an annual event held on the third weekend in June in Bermuda. One of the newest and fastest growing carnivals around the world, Bermuda Carnival celebrated its 5th anniversary in June 2019.

Bermuda Carnival is organized by BHW Ltd., led by Bermudian-Guyanese soca DJ, Jason Sukdeo, a.k.a. D'General, along with Sandra Richards-Vance, Jumaane Davis, and Dr. Akbar Lightbourne.

Originally known as "Bermuda Heroes Weekend", Bermuda Carnival events take place over a long weekend in June, with a national holiday celebrating Bermuda's National Heroes observed on the third Monday in June. This date was previously observed as the Queen's Birthday holiday.

Bermuda Carnival draws inspiration from Caribbean carnivals such as Trinidad and Tobago Carnival and Barbados Crop Over while also celebrating and uplifting elements of Bermudian culture.

== Bermuda Carnival Annual Events ==
- Five Star Friday
- The Raft Up
- J'ouvert
- The Parade of Bands

== Past Bermuda Carnivals ==
- June 2015 - Parade of Bands - Royal Naval Dockyard, Bermuda
- June 2016 - Parade of Bands - Southside, St. David's
- June 2017 - Parade of Bands - Southside, St. David's
- June 2018 - Parade of Bands - Hamilton, Bermuda
- June 2019 - Parade of Bands - Hamilton, Bermuda

== Effects of COVID-19 ==
- June 2020 - Parade of Bands was cancelled due to COVID-19
