= Bayou Bacchanal =

Annual carnival in New Orleans, US

Bayou Bacchanal is an annual carnival in New Orleans that provides a cultural link between the Greater New Orleans area and the island nations of the Caribbean.

== Description ==
The carnival's features include masqueraders who dance through the city streets to the pulsating beats of steel pan drums. (Note: Indigenous instruments of Trinidad and Tobago) Visitors are encouraged to participate in the parade. Many wear exotic-islander costumes, but it is not required. The parade leads to Crescent Park where the carnival finishes with concerts, authentic Caribbean cuisine, arts and crafts. Bayou Bacchanal takes place annually every first Saturday of November.

Bayou Bacchanal is organized by the non-profit Caribbean Carnival/Friends Of Culture (Friends Of Culture), registered as a 501(c)3 non-profit organization in Louisiana, June 21, 2001 by Marilyn C. LaForce.
