= Caribana =

Caribbean festival in Toronto

Coordinates: 43.6322°N 79.4169°W

Toronto Caribbean Carnival
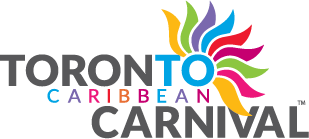
- Abbreviation: TCC
- Formation: 1967-2006 (CAG/CCC); 2006-present (FMC)
- Type: Cultural festival
- Legal status: Active, non-profit
- Purpose: Celebration of Caribbean heritage
- Headquarters: Toronto, Ontario, Canada
- Location: 716 Gordon Baker Rd. Suite 201, Toronto, Ontario
- Official language: English, French
- Chief Executive Officer: Chris Alexander
- Parent organization: Festival Management Committee
- Affiliations: City of Toronto government, Toronto Mas Bands Association, Ontario Steelpan Association (OSA), Organization of Calypso Performing Artists (OCPA)
- Budget: CA$3.33 million
- Staff: 12
- Volunteers: 800
- Website: torontocarnival.ca

The Toronto Caribbean Carnival, formerly and commonly known as Caribana, is a festival of Caribbean culture and traditions held each summer in the city of Toronto, Ontario, Canada. It is a pan-Caribbean Carnival event and has been billed as North America's largest Festival, frequented by over 1.3 million tourists each year for the festival's Grand Parade and an overall attendance of 2.3 million.

Beginning in July, the multi-week festivities lead up to the parade which occurs over the Simcoe Day long weekend, the first weekend in August. The festival also coincides with August 1 Emancipation Day observances that commemorate the emancipation of slaves of African descent. The main stakeholders of the events are the Toronto Mas' Bands Association, the Organization of Calypso Performing Artistes, and the Ontario Steelpan Association.

== Events ==
Several events occur over the course of the festivities celebrating Caribbean culture. While the Parade of Bands is the most-well known festivities, events vary per year and in the past has included exhibits (for example the first Caribana displayed every book published by a Caribbean writer, including Austin Clarke who was the centrepiece of the exhibition); theatre plays (such as Austin Clarke's "Children of the Scheme" which dealt with the plight of Caribbean women who came to Canada on the domestic immigrant worker scheme); and fashion shows.

=== Grand Parade ===
While the Caribbean Festival holds events over several weeks, the culmination of the Caribana event is the final weekend which is punctuated by the street Parade of Bands. This weekend traditionally coincides with the civic holiday in August. The street Parade of Bands consists of costumed dancers (called "Mas players") along with live Caribbean music being played from large speakers on the flat-bed of 18 wheeler trucks. Much of the music associated with the event, such as steel pan, soca and calypso. Floats can also be found which play chutney, dancehall and reggae music.

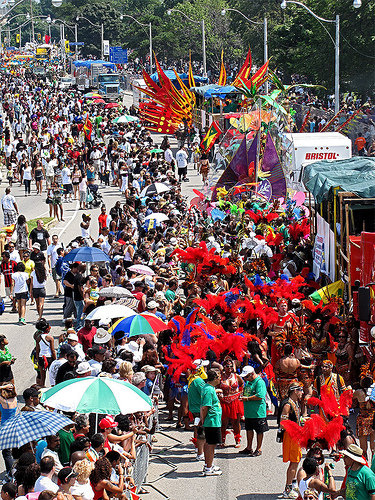

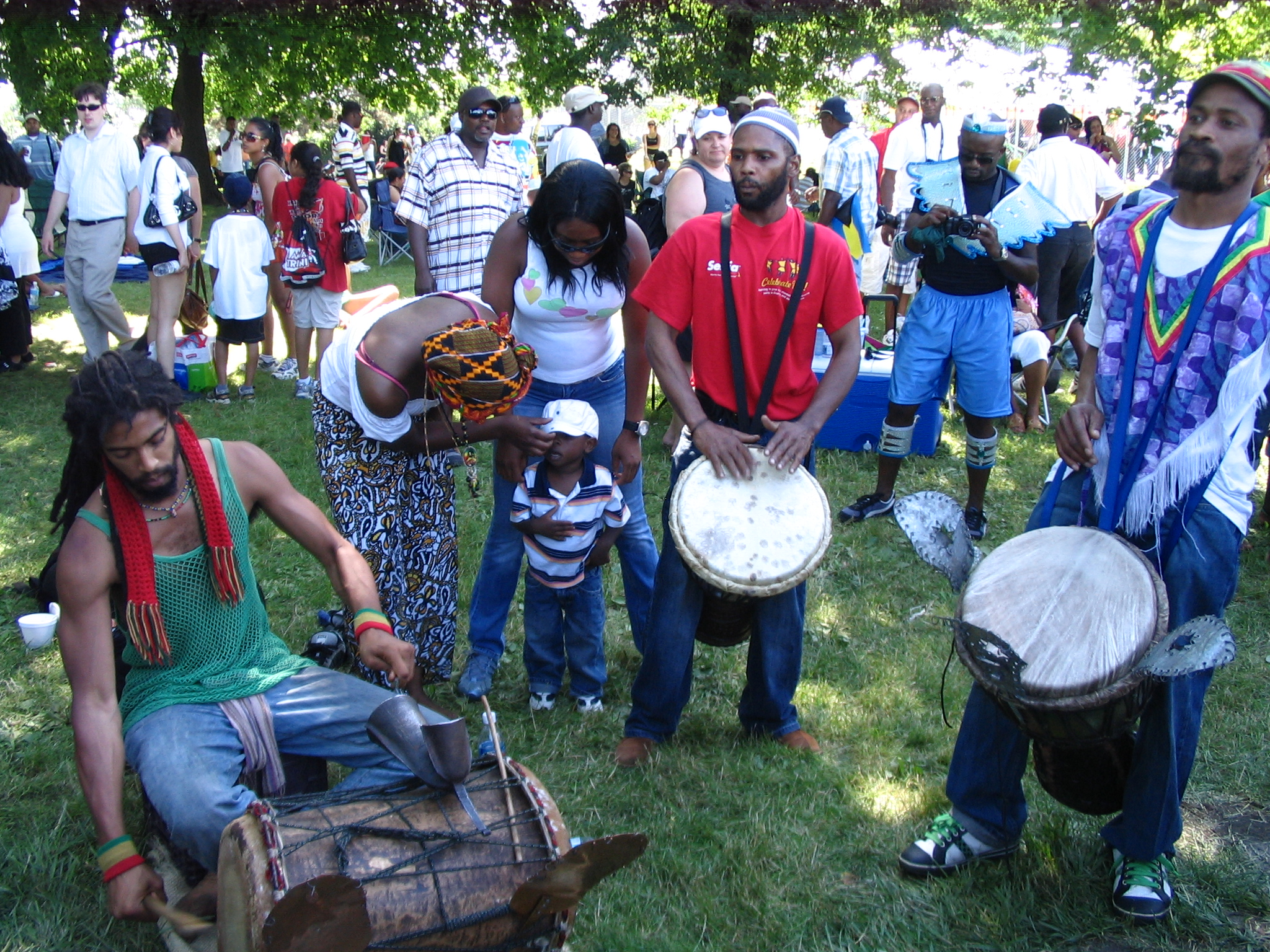

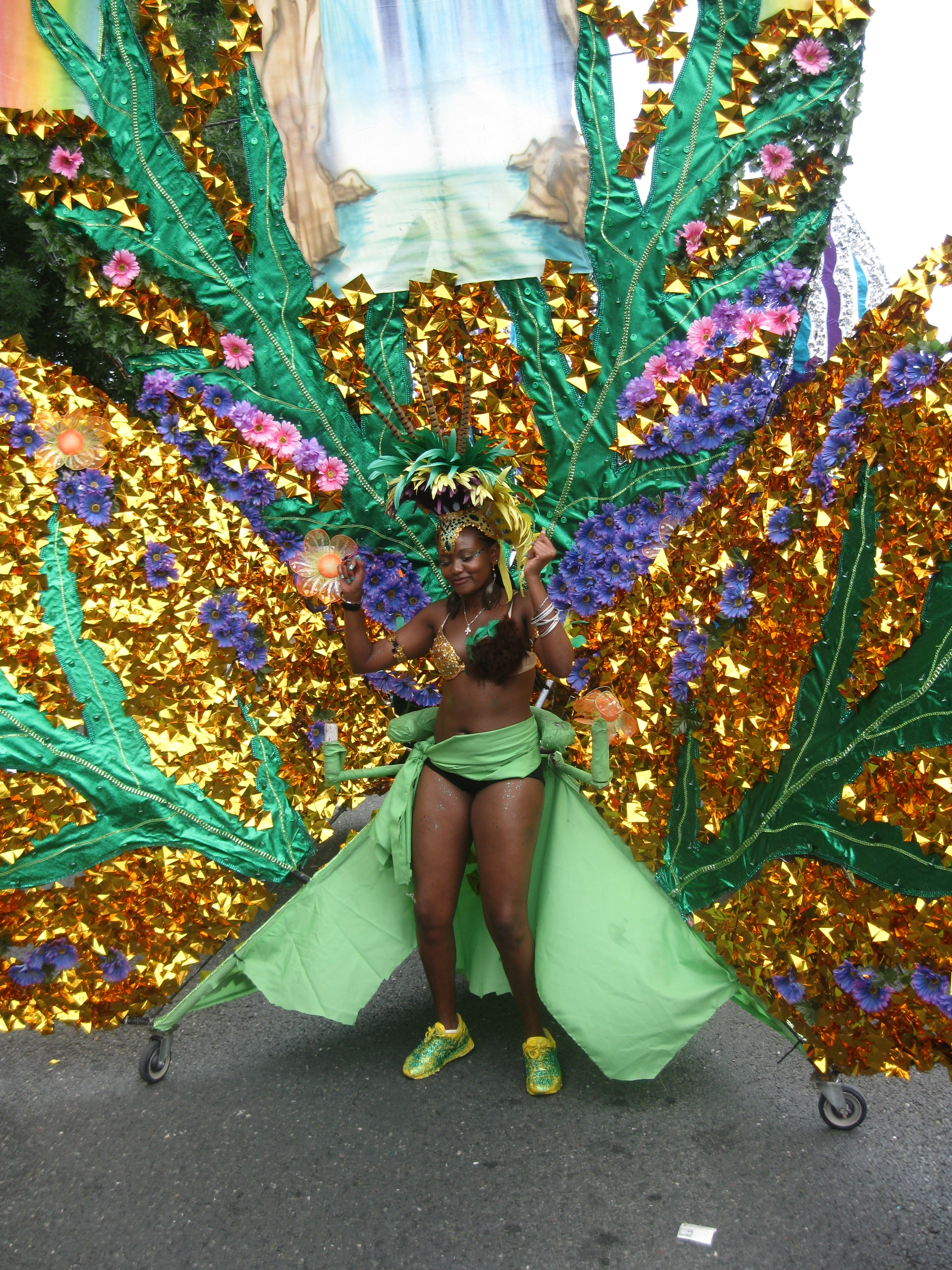
A costume designed by Centennial College's School of Hospitality, Tourism, and Culture for the 2010 parade.

The bands are the most important part of the main Carnival parade. Each band displays an artistic theme through costume-making. In competition with one another during the parade, they pass a judging spot which will rate each band section for its costume design, the energy of masqueraders, the creativity of presentation and so on. Work on the costumes begin soon after the previous year's celebration and usually takes one full year to complete all of the costumes. As of 2017, Whitfield Belasco has led a band since his brother recruited him from the Trinidad Carnival to help organize the first Caribana in 1967. Louis Saldenah has actively participated in Caribana since 1977 and has been awarded the Band of the Year twenty times. A King and Queen of the Band is also judged, and winning is considered claiming the biggest prize of the festival.

In the 1970s, the parade route originally followed Bloor and Yonge Streets ending at Toronto City Hall concluding with a concert at Nathan Phillips Square. In the 1980s, the parade ran along Bay and University Avenue. Since 1991, when the parade shifted to Lake Shore Boulevard into Exhibition Place, In 1993, the Caribana Marketplace covered market was added at Marilyn Bell Park along the parade route. In 2009, barricades were introduced to separate the spectators from those playing mas.

In May 2010, the festival added a new initiative to involve post-secondary schools. The only college to participate was Centennial College School of Hospitality, Tourism and Culture, where they created a costume theme of the Tropical Amazon. Centennial College returned in 2011 and participated in the King and Queen competition for the first time to have their costume judged which is 1ST in Carnival History and For Centennial College Hospitality students participated in the Grand Parade which was expanded to include the entire college to participate in bands.

Band of the Year winners
| Year | Band | Leader(s) |
|---|---|---|
| 2021 | [?] | |
| 2020 | [?] | |
| 2019 | [?] | Louis Saldenah |
| 2018 | [?] | |
| 2017 | [?] | Louis Saldenah |
| 2016 | [?] | |
| 2015 | [?] | |
| 2014 | [?] | |
| 2013 | [?] | |
| 2012 | [?] | |
| 2011 | [?] | |
| 2010 | [?] | |
| 2009 | [?] | |
| 2008 | [?] | |
| 2007 | [?] | |
| 2006 | [?] | |
| 2005 | [?] | |
| 2004 | [?] | |
| 2003 | [?] | |
| 2002 | [?] | |
| 2001 | [?] | |
| 2000 | [?] | |
| 1999 | [?] | |
| 1998 | [?] | |
| 1997 | [?] | |
| 1996 | [?] | |
| 1995 | The Art of Nature | Kenney Combs |
| 1994 | [?] | Louis Saldenah |
| 1993 | The Golden Antilles | Arnold Hughes |
| 1992 | The Architect | Louis Saldenah |
| 1991 | Outa Dis World - Trinidad and Tobago | Louis Saldenah |
| 1990 | Beyond the Darkness | Louis Saldenah |
| 1989 | Fire On Ice | Louis Saldenah |
| 1988 | Of Men and Gods | Arnold Hughes and Associates |
| 1987 | Nations of the World | Eddie Merchant |
| 1986 | The Treasures of Nursery Rhyme and Fairy Tales | Eddie Merchant |
| 1985 | Flight into Fantasy | Selwyn Davis and Whitfield Belasco |
| 1984 | Tribute to Sparrow and Kitchener | Eddie Merchant |
| 1983 | Birds Evolution | Eddie Merchant |
| 1982 | Night Out | Louis Saldenah |
| 1981 | Power of the SKy | Eddie Merchant |
| 1980 | Island in the Sun | Louis Saldenah |
| 1979 | From the Caribbean with Love | Russell Charter |
| 1978 | Birds of a Feather | Raymond Lee |
| 1977 | Shangrila | Louis Saldenah, Harold Saldenah, and Carlos Douglas |
| 1976 | Shaka's Dream Africa | Nip Davis |
| 1975 | A Compendium of Games | Noel Audain |
| 1974 | Festival of Fans/Noctural Emissions | Nip Davis and Earnest Castello/Kenn Shah |
| 1973 | Modes of the Seasons | Earnest Castello |
| 1972 | Tales of Utopia | Earnest Castello |
| 1971 | Tout C'est Beau/Wonderful World of Colour | Earnest Castello/Noel Audain |
| 1970 | Snow Kingdom | Keith Sheppard, Joe Brown, Steve Dyal, Kenn Shah |
| 1969 | Splendor of the Dark Continent | Clive Brand |
| 1968 | The Fantasy of the American Indians | Clive Brand |
| 1967 | Flight Into Fantasy | Alpha King, Whitfield Belasco, and Nip Davis |

=== King and Queen Showcase ===
The night before the grande parade, all the kings and queens (leaders) of the bands compete on stage at Lamport Stadium to be named King and Queen of Carnival. Joella Crichton has been awarded Queen of the Carnival nine times and was subject of "Becoming a Queen" a ninety-minute documentary which screened at the CaribbeanTales International Film Festival.

Queen of the Bands
| Year | Queen | Title | Band | Band Leader(s) |
|---|---|---|---|---|
| 2008 | Joella Crichton | [?] | [?] | [?] |
| 2007 | [?] | | | |
| 2006 | [?] | | | |
| 2005 | [?] | | | |
| 2004 | [?] | | | |
| 2003 | [?] | | | |
| 2002 | [?] | | | |
| 2001 | [?] | | | |
| 2000 | [?] | | | |
| 1999 | [?] | | | |
| 1998 | [?] | | | |
| 1997 | [?] | | | |
| 1996 | [?] | | | |
| 1995 | Danielle Lee | Lady of Life | Sunrise and Sunset | Nip Davis and Courtney Doldron |
| 1994 | Natasha McCollin | Dance Ka Lay Lay | Dancing in the Street | Ken de Freitas |
| 1993 | Penney Sutherland | Amazon Queen | Golden Antilles | Arnold Hughes |
| 1992 | Venetia Saldenah | Pandora Box | The Architect | Louis Saldenah |
| 1991 | Ariene Parris | Wave of Light and Life | [?] | Kenne de Freitas |
| 1990 | [?] | | | |
| 1989 | [?] | | | |
| 1988 | [?] | | | |
| 1987 | [?] | | | |
| 1986 | [?] | | | |
| 1985 | [?] | | | |
| 1984 | [?] | | | |
| 1983 | [?] | | | |
| 1982 | [?] | | | |
| 1981 | [?] | | | |
| 1980 | [?] | | | |
| 1979 | [?] | | | |
| 1978 | [?] | | | |
| 1977 | [?] | | | |
| 1976 | [?] | | | |
| 1975 | [?] | | | |
| 1974 | [?] | | | |
| 1973 | [?] | | | |
| 1972 | [?] | | | |
| 1972 | [?] | | | |
| 1971 | [?] | | | |
| 1970 | [?] | | | |
| 1969 | [?] | | | |
| 1968 | Yvonne Alexander | [?] | [?] | [?] |
| 1967 | Hyacinth Noreiga | [?] | [?] | [?] |

King of the Bands
| Year | King | Title | Band | Band Leader(s) |
|---|---|---|---|---|
| 2008 | Ronald Alleyze | [?] | [?] | [?] |
| 2007 | [?] | | | |
| 2006 | [?] | | | |
| 2005 | [?] | | | |
| 2004 | [?] | | | |
| 2003 | [?] | | | |
| 2002 | [?] | | | |
| 2001 | [?] | | | |
| 2000 | [?] | | | |
| 1999 | [?] | | | |
| 1998 | [?] | | | |
| 1997 | [?] | | | |
| 1996 | [?] | | | |
| 1995 | Jason Connelle/Courtney Doldron | A Mystical Bird/Chaos | So Nice So Sweet/Sunrise and Sunset | Ken de Freitas/Nipp Davis and Courtney Doldron |
| 1994 | Courtney Doldron | XXX | Abracadabra | Nip Davis and Courtney Doldron |
| 1993 | Rudy Rampersad | The Nebula | Light After Dark | Louis Saldenah |
| 1992 | John Kam/Rudy Ramparsad | King Solomon's Dream/Visions of the Architect | Biblical and Mythical Dreams/The Architect | Dreams by Caribbean & Canadian Cultural Club (The 4 C's)/Louis Saldenah |
| 1991 | John Kam | Northern Reflections | Realms of Light | Arnold Hughes |
| 1990 | John Kam | High Priest of El Dorado | Poetry in Motion | Arnold Hughes |
| 1989 | [?] | | | |
| 1988 | [?] | | | |
| 1987 | [?] | | | |
| 1986 | [?] | | | |
| 1985 | [?] | | | |
| 1984 | [?] | | | |
| 1983 | [?] | | | |
| 1982 | [?] | | | |
| 1981 | [?] | | | |
| 1980 | [?] | | | |
| 1979 | [?] | | | |
| 1978 | [?] | | | |
| 1977 | [?] | | | |
| 1976 | [?] | | | |
| 1975 | [?] | | | |
| 1974 | [?] | | | |
| 1973 | [?] | | | |
| 1972 | [?] | | | |
| 1972 | [?] | | | |
| 1971 | [?] | | | |
| 1970 | [?] | | | |
| 1969 | [?] | | | |
| 1968 | Francis Dennis | [?] | [?] | [?] |

=== Calypso Monarch ===
Started in 1980, this judged event crowns a Calypso Monarch for the year.

Caylpso Monarch winners
| Year | Monarch |
|---|---|
| 1988 | John 'Jayson' Perez |
| 1987 | John 'Jayson' Perez |
| 1986 | John 'Jayson' Perez |
| 1985 | [?] |
| 1984 | John 'Jayson' Perez |
| 1983 | [?] |
| 1982 | [?] |
| 1981 | [?] |
| 1980 | Lord Smokey |

=== J'ouvert ===
In addition to the main parade, the Caribbean community also celebrates a smaller pre-dawn parade known as J'ouvert (Pronounced "Jou-vay"). This too has been modelled after Trinidad Carnival. In Caribbean French-creole this means "day open" or morning. The J'ouvert portion of Carnival is the more rhythmic part of the Carnival celebration and is usually featured with steelpan bands, and persons using improvised musical instruments. It is not usually accompanied by any singing but will have a lot of whistles and other music makers. Spectators and or persons "playing Mas" will occasionally get themselves covered from head-to-toe with mud, flour, baby powder, or different water-colored paints in the tradition of the Caribbean-based J'ouvert celebrations. In many instances, everyone in the band is supposed to resemble evil spirits while parading around at night. There are some common characters that are a part of Afro-Caribbean folklore and include things like Red Devils (people covered in red paints), Blue Devils (people covered in blue paints), Green devils, Black devils ( Jab Jab -traditionally portrayed in the Island of Grenada), Yellow devils, White devils, (usually people throwing baby powder or flour.) or people just covered in other concoctions which are supposed to resemble mud or oil.

=== Other events ===
- Junior Carnival Parade: The junior carnival (commonly known as Kiddie Carnival) has run since, at least, the 1990s and provides an opportunity for young masquerades to dance through the streets. Similar to the grand parade, the junior carnival consists of a series of bands with leaders who display costumes in competition.
- Junior King and Queen Showcase: This was introduced in 2017 to allow the Younger kids to showcase Jr King and Queen's at Malvern Town Centre before the Jr Grand Parade & Family Day.
- Fêtes (parties): Leading up to the main parade a number of Caribbean music artists perform in Toronto. These parties are generally called "fêtes", for a French-Creole Caribbean word meaning "festival", and usually start in June/July.
- Jump-ups (dances)
- Picnics (Food Fest): Originally taking place on the Toronto Islands, the island picnics now occur at Ontario Place. Picnics are two days of feasting on rotis, jerk chicken and festival, callaloo, goat head soup, potato pudding, pelau, fried fish, cow foot, rum cakes; drinking sorrell, Mauby, and ginger beer; and dancing to music.
- Calypso tents (shows)
- Talk tents: Talk tents contain shows featuring storytellers, comedians and others well versed in oral traditions.
- Gala (Carnival Ball): The gala, debuted in 2008, is an evening of elegance celebrating Carnival music, arts, and the works of the pioneers of the Caribana festival.
- Pan blockos/blockorama (steel band street parties)

== History ==
=== Origins ===
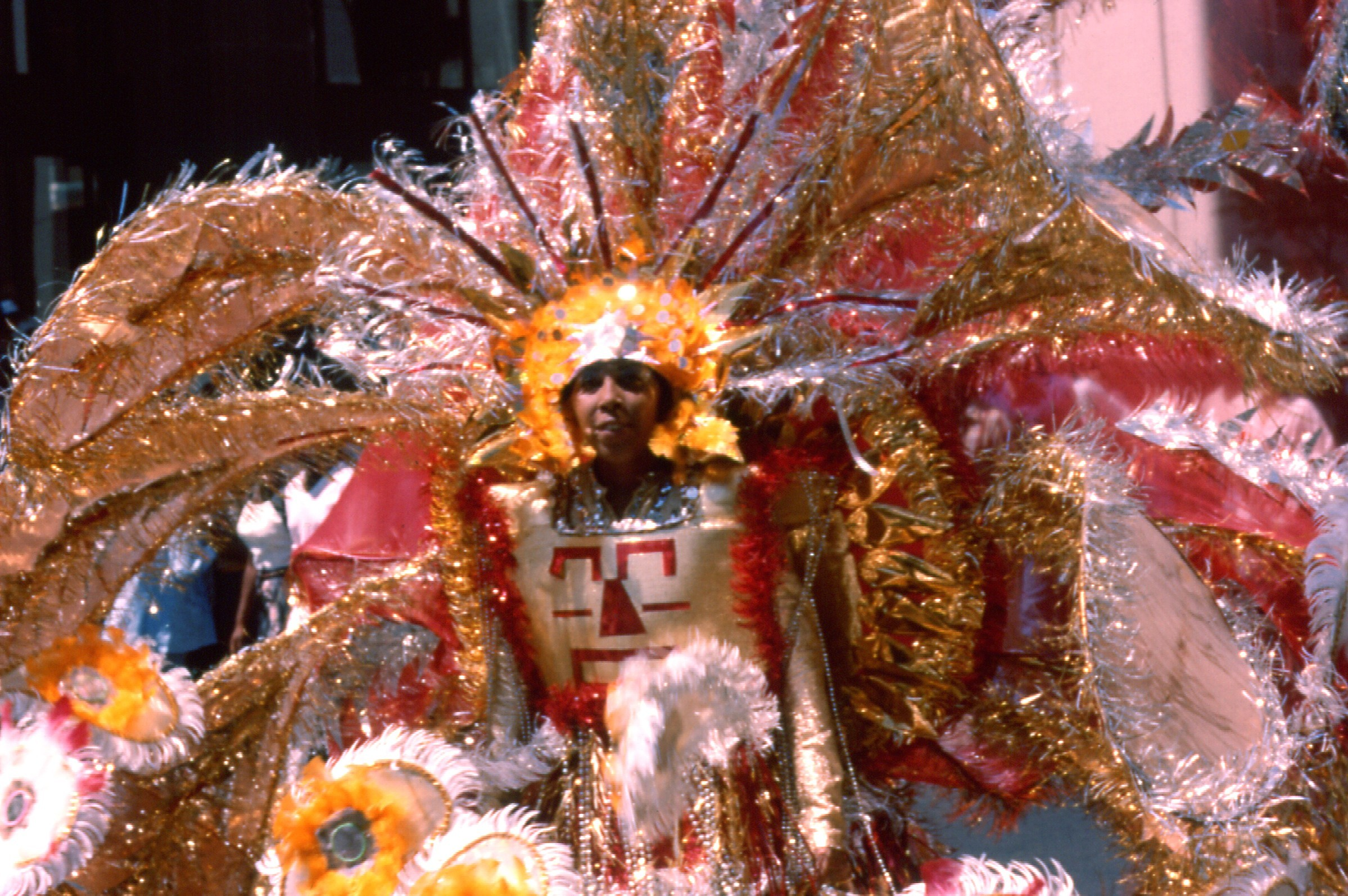
A Caribana parade participant in 1977.

Caribana has run annually since 1967, first performed as a gift from Canada's Caribbean community, as a tribute to Canada's Centennial. Billing itself as a multicultural nation, the Canadian government invited ethno-cultural groups to contribute celebrations with representations of their ethnic diversity. Caribana emerged during a time when many Caribbean residents emigrated to Canada following immigration reform, internationally acclaimed singers were popularizing Caribbean music (for example Harry Belafonte sang to a sold-out crowd at the O'Keefe Centre in Toronto), Civil Rights Movement activities including the Canadian visits by Malcolm X and Martin Luther King Jr., and Muhammad Ali's fight against the Canadian heavyweight champion George Chuvalo.

Introduced by immigrants from the Caribbean, Caribana showcases multiple cultures and traditions from same heritage backgrounds coming together to celebrate their heritage ties (namely, Afro-Caribbeana persons of African descent born or living in a Caribbean nation). Caribana's roots has links to slavery and the struggle for emancipation, as well as post-colonial pan-Caribbean influence of the 1960s. Following the carnival format, particularly that of the Trinidad and Tobago Carnival, Caribana's Caribbean influences include traditions from many of the islands: Jonkunnu in Jamaica, Crop Over in Barbados, and other similar festivals in Cuba, Haiti, and the Dominican Republic.

Caribana also taps into the legacy of the pre-Lenten Calypso Carnival celebrations organized by the Canadian Negro Women's Organization (CANEWA) and headed by Kay Livingstone. From 1952 to 1964, CANEWA produced, funded, and hosted these annual one-day celebrations of Caribbean culture through food, dance, and music as fundraisers for scholarships to assist Black students to attend recently desegregated schools in southern Ontario.

The centuries-long Black Canadian tradition of Emancipation Day parades are also an influence on Caribana. Emancipation Day Parades began to celebrate the liberation of the enslaved throughout the Americas and were largely observed around the same time as the Calypso Carnivals. The founders of this parade were largely descendants of fugitive slaves and other Black American immigrants. The parades were marked as a Black victory over the British and operated as a military-style event, displaying military regalia, marching bands, and drum corps. Emancipation Day Parades became the most notable displays by and for Black Canadians prior to Caribana.

The founding organizers' goal of using festival profits to create a Black community centre remain unfulfilled.

=== Administrative history ===
Plans for the first Caribana began in February 1966, when a group from Toronto's West Indian community came together in an abandoned firehall on Bathurst Street and formed a celebration for Canada's centennial. The group, originally named the Caribbean Centennial Committee, transformed into the Caribbean Committee for Cultural Advancement (CCAC) in 1968 when they decided that the event should be an annual celebration. One year later, the CCAC incorporated as the Caribbean Cultural Committee (CCC). This group consisted of ten individuals with its board members mostly made up of expatriate-Caribbean nationals living in Canada. One of these members was Trinidadian-born librarian Rita Cox. Charles Roach and Julius Alexander Isaac (the first Black judge of the Federal Court of Appeal) were among the community leaders who organized the first Caribana. The CCC changed its name to the Caribbean Committee for Cultural Advancement (CCCA) in 1968 and Caribbean Cultural Committee (CCC) in 1969.

In 1970, the Carnival Development Association (CDA) organized a different festival under the name “Carnival Extravaganza.” The Carnival was created in response to the CCC's Caribana, which celebrated a pan-Caribbean culture and the Black Canadian identity. The CDA's intention was to make a Carnival which was more “authentic” and reflected Trinidadian culture. In 1974 and 1976, the province turned down an application by the CCC and gave a substantial sum to the CDA.

By 1980, the two organizing committees came together and the CCC once again was the sole organizing committee of Caribana. During this decade, the competing interests of the Metro police, city officials, and the corporate sponsors of Caribana threatened to overshadow the CCC's leadership. For example, in 1985, the police recommended moving the popular Olympic Island picnic event to the mainland but the picnics continued until 2009.

In 1991, the Caribana parade was moved to Exhibition Place and Lakeshore Boulevard. Previously, participants jumped up and played mas down Yonge Street or University Avenue on their way to the Toronto Islands.

As the festival became a permanent annual event, the festival organization became dependent on borrowing money from the City of Toronto prior to the festival, to be repaid out of festival profits (if any) afterwards. By 1992, the festival had built up a debt to the city. The City of Toronto forgave the entire outstanding debt after the 1992 event. The same year, Caribana developed a new partnership with Toronto-area hotels. In 1993, the organization fired its operating chief. Following Puff Daddy's performance in 1997, many observers raised concerns regarding cultural retention and festival organizers' moral-cultural responsibility. At launch in Nathan Phillips Square, Premier Bob Rae calls the event a "beacon of hope" for all Canadians, as a symbol of racial harmony. "Carry a Can to Caribana" launched, in support of Daily Bread Food Bank. With attendance down, the board chair blamed the federal and provincial tourism ministries for not funding their American advertising campaign.

In 1997, the bandleaders threatened to boycott the parade if they were not paid for the year's previous festival and provided with the necessary seed-money to fund production for 1997. The bandleaders were organized under the Ontario Mas Producers Association (OMPA) and the Toronto Mas Makers Association (TMMA). The OMPA would become the Toronto Mas Band Association (TMBA) in 2000.

By the early 2000s, several organizations formed which represented different groups involved in Caribana. The TMBA oversaw the making and promotion of mas bands and represented their interests. The Ontario Steelpan Association (OSA), organized in 2002, did the same for the steelpan musicians. These associations, which also included the Ontario Calypso Performing Artistes (OCPA), formed in 1981, became key stakeholders in Caribana.

In 2001, the City of Toronto granted permits for the TMBA to organize the parade. In 2002, the parade and king and queen crowning were also organized by the TMBA. The following year, the CCC was again the sole organizer of Caribana's events.

In September 2004, after the 37th festival, the consul general of Trinidad and Tobago worked with Caribbean Cultural Committee to increase support from the business community; the committee received around CA$1 million that year from the national, provincial, and city governments, but it cost about twice that to run the festival. In 2006, the City of Toronto government, unsatisfied by the CCC's financial audit report, invited the TMBA to apply for funding to operate and manage Caribana for 2006. In the end, a city-appointed committee, the Festival Management Committee (FMC), in arrangement with the CCC board members, agreed to organize Caribana for one year. The proposed structure of the FMC's board of directors was to include: two representatives from the TMBA, one representative from the OSA, one representative from the CPA, and seven additional members chosen by the festival's stakeholders, including the CCC. The Caribana Arts Group (CAG), which succeeded the CCC in 2005, applied but was denied funding to resume its organization of Caribana. In 2006, the FMC board included two members of the CAG; however, both representatives withdrew from the board in 2010.

Due to an ongoing dispute about the ownership of the trademark "Caribana," the 2006 festival was promoted as "the Toronto Caribbean Carnival (Caribana)". In 2009, the festival was advertised as the "Scotiabank Caribana Festival" which resulted in a trademark lawsuit from CAG, as Caribana was trademarked in 1977, following unsuccessful attempts to reach a licensing agreement. As the successor organization of the CCC, the CAG is the trademark holder to "Caribana." Following the settlement of the trademark infringement in 2011, the festival's name was changed to "Scotiabank Caribbean Carnival." The name changed to "Toronto Caribbean Carnival" in 2015 when Scotiabank discontinued their sponsorship.

In 2019 UNESCO the Canadian Commission officially recognizes the festival and names it a Cultural heritage property.

In 2024, the Festival Management Committee (FMC) underwent significant leadership changes. According to The Caribbean Camera, FMC Chair Joe Halstead, Chief Financial Officer Eddison Doyle, and longtime board member Chris Alexander tendered their resignations. The organization subsequently appointed new board members, including Jennifer Hirlehey, Ann Marie Sutton, and Henry Gomez, and introduced new administrative leadership with Mischka Crichton serving as Chief Executive Officer and Adrian Charles as Festival Operations Manager.

In 2026, once again the Festival Management Committee went through another change in Leadership with the surprise resignation of Toronto Caribbean Carnival CEO - Mischka Crichton and the resignation of FMC Chair Jennifer Hirlehey where the FMC Board lead by newly appointed Board Chair, Ann Marie Sutton brought back longtime former CAO/COO Chris Alexander back as the CEO for the Toronto Caribbean Carnival.

=== Naming dispute ===
The name Caribana was invented by the organizers to capture the notions of Canada, the Caribbean, bacchanal and merrymaking. A naming dispute arose over the use of "Caribana." The Caribbean Cultural Committee claimed that it legally held the trademark for "Caribana". In April 2010, a panel for the World Intellectual Property Organization (WIPO) ruled that Scotiabank, as the sponsors of the Caribana festival, did not have grounds for being awarded the domain name caribana.com from its current owners the Working Word Co-operative. In 2011, the Ontario Superior Court Of Justice ruled that the Caribana Arts Group (CAG), the successors of Caribbean Cultural Committee (CCC), has legal rights to the name Caribana.

=== Sponsorship ===
The first named festival sponsor was Scotiabank (Scotiabank Caribana from 2007 to 2011 and Scotiabank Toronto Caribbean Carnival from 2011 to 2015). In October 2015, Scotiabank announced that it would end its sponsorship with Toronto's Caribbean Carnival parade after six years.

The festival continued without a naming sponsor until 2017, when Peeks became the new title sponsor and the festival became the Peeks Toronto Caribbean Carnival. In June 2019, Peeks' title sponsorship was removed and the festival was called the Toronto Caribbean Carnival for 2019.

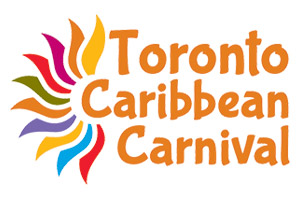

Logo from 2011 to 2015

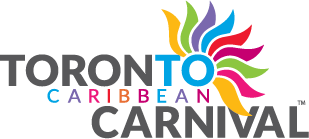

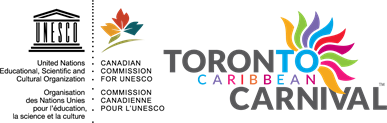

=== COVID-19 alternative formats ===
The 2020 and 2021 editions of the event were cancelled because of the global COVID-19 pandemic; consequently, it took place in a "virtual format" on July 3, 2020. In order to accommodate restrictions during the pandemic during the summer of 2021, the festival pivoted to a foodie event with steel pans and masqueraders and replaced the grande parade with a food truck festival.

== Economics and impact ==
The event is one of the first Caribbean Carnivals, along with those in New York City, Notting Hill and Boston, to be held outside of the Caribbean region. Economic studies estimate that the festival contributes approximately $400 million into Ontario's economy each year with the Federal Government being the largest beneficiary. The participation demographics of over 1.2 million attendees indicates that 58% of attendees are from outside the Greater Toronto Area and over one million individuals from the United States. Approximately 72% of participants have previously attended Caribana.

== In popular culture ==
In the song "Don't Run" by PartyNextDoor, PartyNextDoor recites lyrics referencing Caribana: "She wanna come to the 6ix side / She know that's the best side, Caribana."

== See also ==
- Carifiesta
- List of festivals in Canada
- List of festivals in Ontario
- List of festivals in Toronto
