= Batabano =

Carnival in the Cayman Islands

Batabano (officially called Cayman Carnival Batabano) is the name of the Caribbean Carnival held in the Cayman Islands. The festival takes place annually during the first week of May in George Town. Batabano is a time for people of all different descents to gather with a common interest and celebrate community spirit. The Cayman Islands are home to over 100 different nationalities, all brought together and embraced by the festival. It is a cultural celebration filled with music, dance, and elaborate costumes that reflect the landscapes, heritage, and culture. International interest is growing in the Batabano celebrations, despite only having existed for about 30 years.

== History ==
The Rotary Club launched the first Cayman Carnival Batabano celebration in 1983. The celebration has always been held in early May. Donna Myrie-Stephen is the chair of a volunteer committee that has been in charge of organizing Batabano for the past 15 years. She is now considered the face of Batabano. Myrie-Stephen was crowned Miss Cayman Islands in 1981, and later named the Rotary Club International Sweetheart.

Carnival celebrations originated in Europe during the Pre-Lent period. Throughout history, Carnival celebrations in the Caribbean have been symbolic of transgression from European control. As they were brought over to the Caribbean colonies, some countries adapted the Caribbean Carnival to be their own, often by varying the time of year. Cayman Batabano was established more recently than other carnivals, as it is only entering its 34th year.

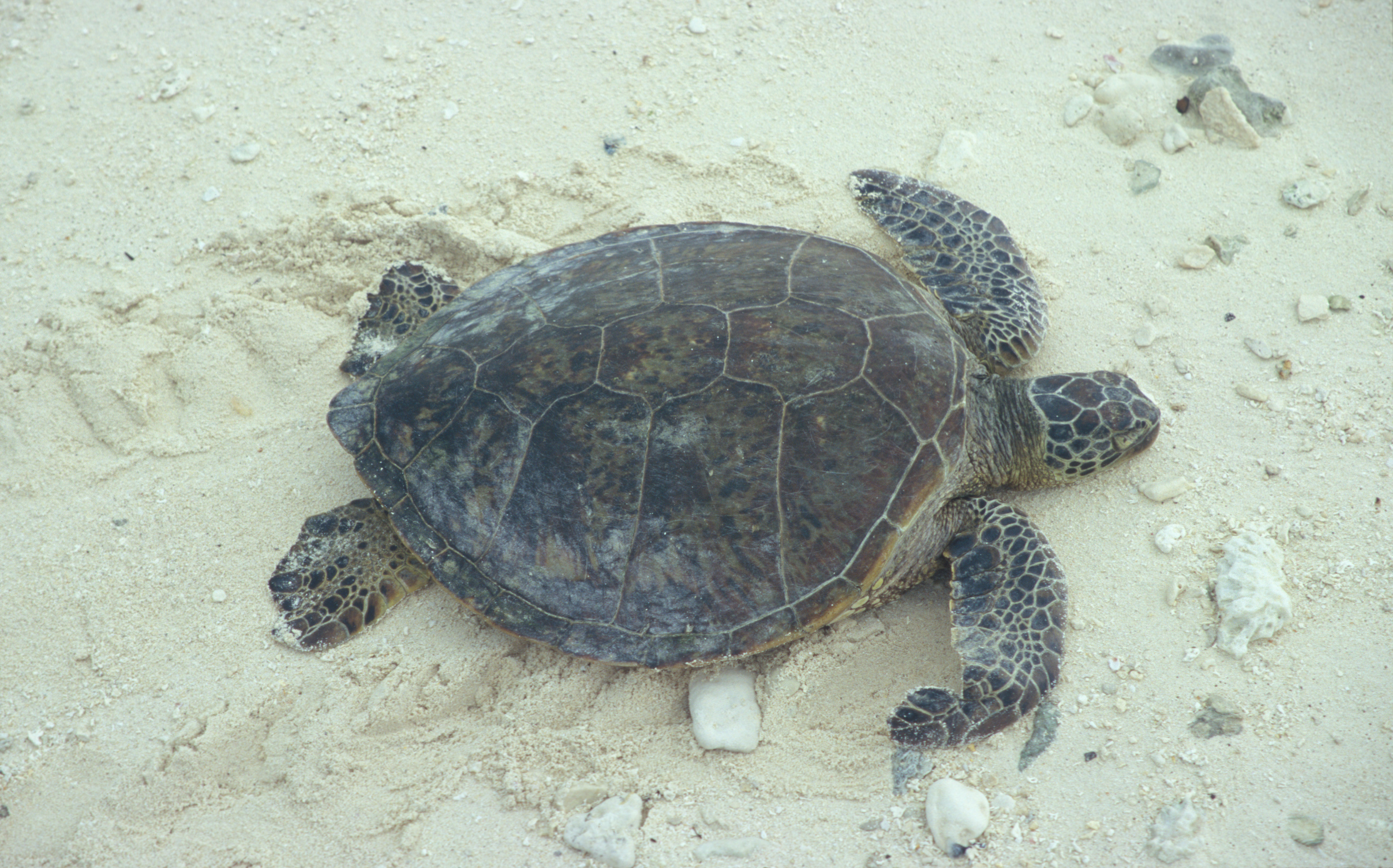
Green sea turtle coming on to the beach to nest.

The name of the celebration comes from the nation's turtling heritage. The word “Batabano” refers to the tracks that are left in the sand when the turtles come onto the beach to nest. The tracks are reason to celebrate because they signify that the turtle population is replenishing itself. Turtles have always been an important part of Caymanian heritage; in the 1600s and 1700s, the islands became an important stop for ships due to the abundant population of green sea turtles. The turtle population has diminished significantly due to excessive hunting, but it still remains an important symbol of the Cayman Islands.

== Batabano celebrations ==
Cayman Carnival Batabano celebrations take place on two separate weekends, one is a child-friendly, family-style festival, and the other is the more traditional adult-focused celebration.

=== Adult Batabano ===
The Adult Batabano celebrations take place in one of the first weekends in May. It features a road parade composed, for the most part, of Masquerade Bands, and exotic costumes. The celebrations start around midday, and the parade launches at 1pm from Public Beach to Harbour Drive. The parade passes a number of Batabano hot spots along its famous route. Judges are located near the Governor's house for the final judging of costumes. Many other events take place on the day of Batabano, including the bazaar and street party. The street party begins at 6pm and usually features nine DJs across three stages. The bazaar is located at Cardinal Avenue and Albert Panton Street.

=== Junior Batabano ===
Junior Batabano was first introduced in 2002, adding a more family-friendly aspect to the celebration. By 2005, Junior Batabano had evolved from a singular program that was held before the adult parade, to an event that spans an entire day. Children participate in a parade, which ends with a panel of pageant judges who are tasked with awarding the best junior band. The local schools' PTAs organize face painting, mask decorating, and food stalls for after the parade. Junior Batabano typically takes place a week before the adult parade and celebration.

=== Music ===
Batabano typically features soca music- a type of calypso music with elements of soul. The lyrics usually are about life or politics, feeding into the idea that Batabano celebrates social justice. Masquerade bands are extremely popular at the Batabano celebrations. Some include Carnival Nationz, and Tribal Cayman. The bands for the upcoming carnival are announced at the “All Ah We” band launch. This event is held months before the Batabano celebrations begin.

=== Costumes ===
Batabano is known for its extravagant costumes. The Masquerade Bands that partake in the parade use costumes to highlight their performances. At the end of both the Junior and Adult parade, the best costumes of the year are recognized and awarded. Traditional men's costumes include shorts, feathered headdresses, and jeweled neck pieces and cuffs. Women's full costume usually includes a multicolored bikini, feather headdresses, leg pieces, and extra tail feathers. Corsets and capes are offered as optional extras. Costumes are debuted along with the Masquerade Bands at the "All Ah We" band launch. The Junior Batabano costumes are slightly less extravagant and tend to cover more skin.

==== Reba Dilbert ====
Reba Dilbert is a popular costume designer on the island. She is known for creating large and exotic pieces. Her costumes have been featured at over 30 Batabano celebrations. The costumes are designed to reflect the flora, fauna, and marine life of the Cayman Islands. Blue costumes represent the island's water, and green costumes represent the environment. Dilbert has expressed her intentions to design costumes that will offer more coverage than in previous years. Her plan is to take the nakedness away from Batabano and focus more on the bright colors and themes of the costumes. In 1998, Dilbert was nominated for Outstanding Work in Costume Design by the Cayman National Cultural Foundation, and in 2002 she won the Best National Costume in the Miss Bikini World (Malta) and Miss Tourism World (Turkey) pageants.

==== Makeup ====
Makeup is an important feature of the Batabano costumes. Bright colors and glitter are often used to accent the costumes, and darker makeup looks can be used to contrast the costumes. Feather eyelash extensions made to match the costumes are a popular look. Kadian Edie is a makeup artist in the Cayman Islands who specializes in tribal tattoos around the eyes, which give a dramatic element to the costumes. They are created using lace and other stencils, and an airbrush.

== What to expect ==
Donna Myrie-Stephen, head of Cayman Carnival Batabano, plans to include neighboring islands in the Batabano celebrations in coming years. It is thought that this will draw an even larger international crowd, and inspire contestants to create even more extravagant costumes. If Myrie-Stephen is successful, then Cayman Batabano will grow to an even more internationally recognized celebration of local heritage and culture than it already is.

== Sponsors ==
General sponsors:

- Cayman Islands Department of Tourism
- Ministry of District Administration, Tourism, and Transport
- Cayman Airways
- Cayman Compass
- Netclues! Web Design and Marketing
- Hot 104.1 FM
- Le Classique
- George Carvalho International Beauty Salon
- Pinnacle Media
- DHL
- Picture This Studios
- Explore Events!
- Yabsta Digital
- Rent Andy Cars
- Cayman Spirits Co.
- Hard Rock Café
- This is Cayman
- Cayman 27
