= 1823 =

1823 in various calendars
- Gregorian calendar: 1823; MDCCCXXIII
- Ab urbe condita: 2576
- Armenian calendar: 1272; ԹՎ ՌՄՀԲ
- Assyrian calendar: 6573
- Balinese saka calendar: 1744–1745
- Bengali calendar: 1229–1230
- Berber calendar: 2773
- British Regnal year: 3 Geo. 4 – 4 Geo. 4
- Buddhist calendar: 2367
- Burmese calendar: 1185
- Byzantine calendar: 7331–7332
- Chinese calendar: 壬午年 (Water Horse); 4520 or 4313 — to — 癸未年 (Water Goat); 4521 or 4314
- Coptic calendar: 1539–1540
- Discordian calendar: 2989
- Ethiopian calendar: 1815–1816
- Hebrew calendar: 5583–5584
- Hindu calendars
- Vikram Samvat: 1879–1880
- Shaka Samvat: 1744–1745
- Kali Yuga: 4923–4924
- Holocene calendar: 11823
- Igbo calendar: 823–824
- Iranian calendar: 1201–1202
- Islamic calendar: 1238–1239
- Japanese calendar: Bunsei 6 (文政６年)
- Javanese calendar: 1750–1751
- Julian calendar: Gregorian minus 12 days
- Korean calendar: 4156
- Minguo calendar: 89 before ROC 民前89年
- Nanakshahi calendar: 355
- Thai solar calendar: 2365–2366
- Tibetan calendar: ཆུ་ཕོ་རྟ་ལོ་ (male Water-Horse); 1949 or 1568 or 796 — to — ཆུ་མོ་ལུག་ལོ་ (female Water-Sheep); 1950 or 1569 or 797

1823 (MDCCCXXIII) was a common year starting on Wednesday of the Gregorian calendar and a common year starting on Monday of the Julian calendar, the 1823rd year of the Common Era (CE) and Anno Domini (AD) designations, the 823rd year of the 2nd millennium, the 23rd year of the 19th century, and the 4th year of the 1820s decade. As of the start of 1823, the Gregorian calendar was 12 days ahead of the Julian calendar, which remained in localized use until 1923.

== Events ==
=== January–March ===
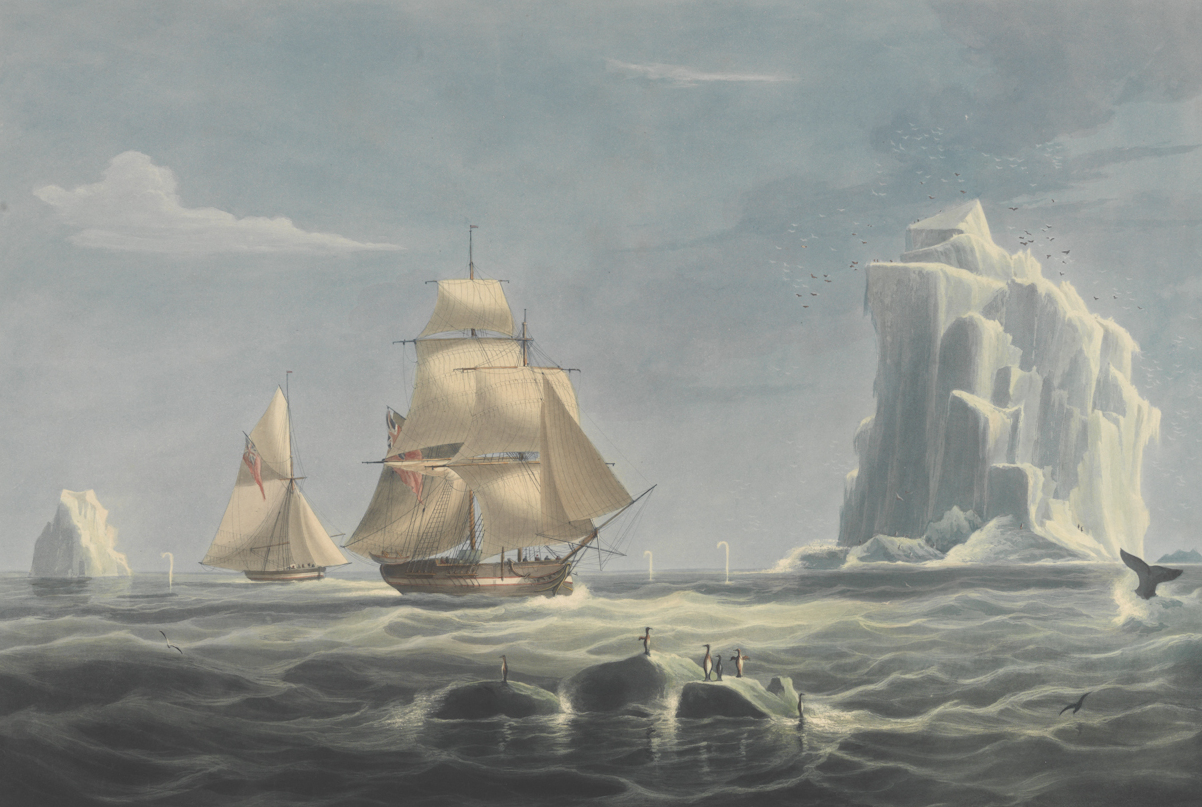
February 20: James Weddell's Jane and Beaufoy at their furthest south.

- January 22 – By secret treaty signed at the Congress of Verona, the Quintuple Alliance gives France a mandate to invade Spain for the purpose of restoring Ferdinand VII (who has been captured by armed revolutionary liberals) as absolute monarch of the country.
- January 23 – In Paviland Cave on the Gower Peninsula of Wales, William Buckland inspects the "Red Lady of Paviland", the first identification of a prehistoric (male) human burial (although Buckland dates it as Roman).
- February 3
  - Jackson Male Academy, precursor of Union University, opens in Alabama.
  - Gioachino Rossini's opera Semiramide is first performed, at La Fenice in Venice.
- February 10 – The first worldwide carnival parade takes place in Cologne, Prussia.
- February 11 – Carnival tragedy of 1823: About 110 boys are killed during a stampede at the Convent of the Minori Osservanti in Valletta, Malta.
- February 15 (approx.) – The first officially recognised gold is found in Australia, by surveyor James McBrien at Fish River, near Bathurst, New South Wales, predating the Australian gold rushes.
- February 20 – Explorer James Weddell's expedition to Antarctica reaches latitude 74°15' S and longitude 34°16'45" W: the southernmost position any ship has reached at this time.
- February 28 – José de la Riva Agüero is sworn as the first president of Peru following a coup against the government of José de la Mar. He only rules 115 days.
- March 15 – Sailor Benjamin Morrell erroneously reports the existence of the island of New South Greenland near Antarctica.
- March 19 – Emperor Agustín de Iturbide of Mexico abdicates, thus ending the short-lived First Mexican Empire.

=== April–June ===
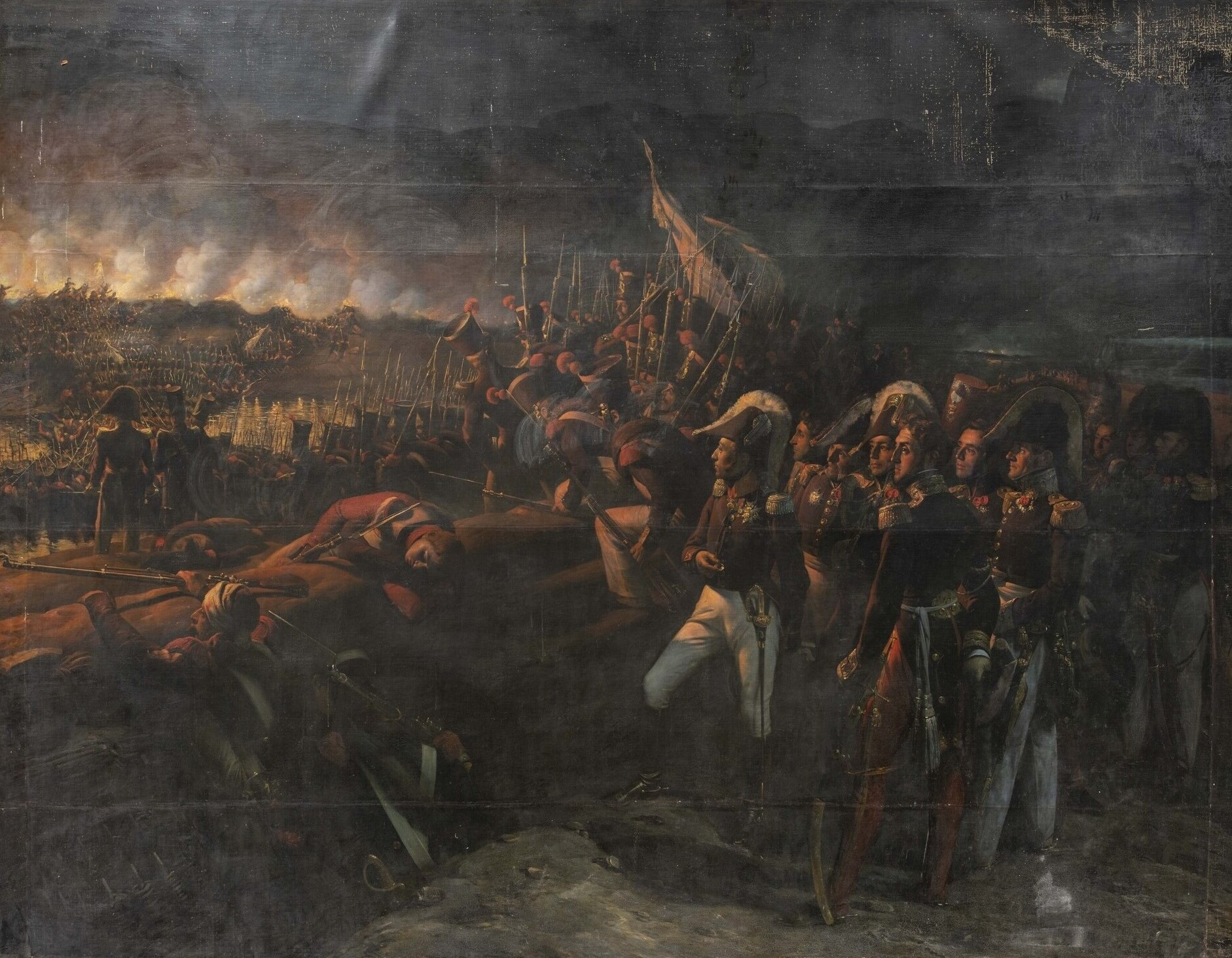
April 7: The "Hundred Thousand Sons of Saint Louis", a French infantry force, begin an attack on Spain that lasts until November.

- April 7 – French forces, the "Hundred Thousand Sons of Saint Louis", cross the Spanish border at the Bidasoa River.
- April 10 – Siege of Pamplona begins in Navarre as French troops besiege the city's garrison.
- April 13 – Franz Liszt, 11, gives a concert in Vienna, after which he is personally congratulated by Ludwig van Beethoven.
- May 5 – Emperor Pedro I of Brazil inaugurates Brazil's first Assembleia Geral, with 50 Senators and 102 Deputies.
- May 7 – Mikhail Semyonovich Vorontsov is appointed as Governor-General of Novorossiya (New Russia), the portion of Russian Empire bordering the Black Sea (in modern days it constitutes southern regions of Ukraine).
- May 9 – Russian author Alexander Pushkin begins work on his verse novel Eugene Onegin.
- May 23
  - The rebel Spanish government withdraws from Madrid to Seville following the French advance.
- May 25
  - The Duke of Angoulême, commander of the invading French forces, establishes a regency in Madrid on behalf of Ferdinand VII who remains a captive of the Spanish government.
  - The Catholic Association, a campaign for Catholic emancipation within the United Kingdom, begins in Ireland at a meeting of 13 people at a bookseller's house on Capel Street in Dublin.
- June 5 – Raffles Institution is established (as the Singapore Institution) by the founder of Singapore, Sir Stamford Raffles.
- June 23 – Peruvian president José de la Riva Agüero is impeached by Congress. He rebels and establishes a short-lived rival government in Trujillo.

=== July–September ===
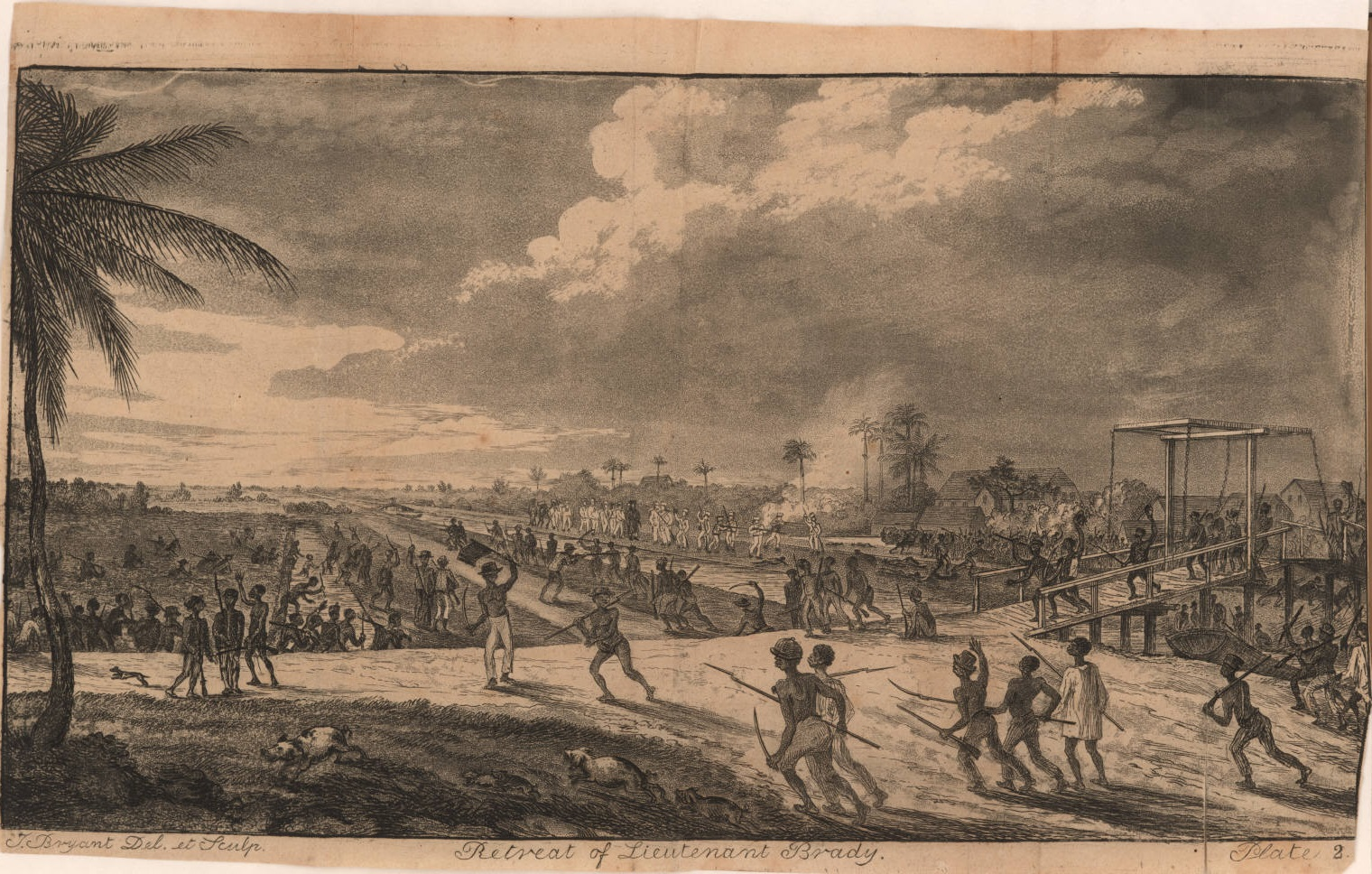
August 18: The Demerara rebellion of 1823 is started by 10,000 black slaves in British Guiana.

- July 1 – The Congress of Central America declares absolute independence from Spain, Mexico and any other foreign nation, including North America, and a republican system of government is established.
- July 4 – Royal assent is given to several significant Acts of Parliament in the United Kingdom, after the Home Secretary (and future Prime Minister) Robert Peel had worked to get approval by Parliament. Approved are the Judgment of Death Act 1823, effectively abolishing the death penalty for over 100 offences and; allowing judges to commute sentences for capital offences (other than murder or treason) to imprisonment or transportation.; the Transportation Act allowing convicts transported to the colonies to be employed on public works. On July 10, the Gaols Act 1823 is given assent, beginning the process of prison reform based on the campaign of Elizabeth Fry.
- July 15 – The Basilica of Saint Paul Outside the Walls in Rome is almost completely destroyed by fire.
- July 16 – José Bernardo de Tagle elected as the second president of Peru by the Peruvian Congress.
- July 28 – The first theatrical adaptation of the Frankenstein story, Presumption; or, the Fate of Frankenstein, opens at the Royal Opera House, Covent Garden in London. On August 29, Mary Shelley attends a performance, the only version of her novel she will ever see.
- August 1 – William Pitt Amherst arrives in Calcutta with Lady Amherst to become the new Governor-General of India.
- August 4 – Felipe Enrique Neri, Baron de Bastrop, the Mexican government administrator in charge of Anglo-American immigration into Mexico's state of Coahuila y Tejas, allows Stephen F. Austin to put together an 11-man police force, that will later be expanded to become the Texas Ranger Division.
- August 5 – The Royal Hibernian Academy is founded in Dublin.
- August 16 – Tsar Alexander I of Russia draws up a secret "manifesto", designating his second younger brother Nikolai to succeed him, bypassing Nikolai's older brother, Grand Duke Konstantin. The existence of the manifesto is revealed on Alexander's death in 1825.
- August 18 – Demerara rebellion of 1823: In the British colony of Demerara-Essequibo (modern-day Guyana in South America), an insurrection of 10,000 black slaves begins; it is suppressed after three days, but hundreds of suspects are executed in the reprisals that follow.
- August 20 – Pope Pius VII dies after a reign of more than 23 years that began on March 14, 1800; he is remembered for crowning Napoleon Bonaparte as Emperor of France.
- August 24 – Hugh Glass gets mauled by a sow grizzly while on a fur trapping expedition in the Missouri Territory and has to crawl 200 miles for help.
- August 31 – Battle of Trocadero: French infantry of the "Hundred Thousand Sons of Saint Louis" capture the fort of Trocadero and turn its guns on Cádiz.
- September 10 – Simón Bolívar is named dictator of Peru.
- September 17 – Pamplona surrenders to French forces after a five-month siege.
- September 22 – Joseph Smith first goes to the place near Manchester, New York, where the golden plates are stored, having been directed there by God through an angel (according to what he writes in 1838).
- September 23 – First Anglo-Burmese War: Burmese forces attack the British on Shapura, an island close to Chittagong.
- September 28 – Roman Catholic Cardinal Annibale della Genga is elected Pope Leo XII.
- September 30 – Cádiz surrenders to the French and Ferdinand VII of Spain is restored to his throne, immediately repealing the liberal Spanish Constitution of 1812. Despite French advice, he begins an era of repression against his opponents known as the Ominous Decade.

=== October–December ===
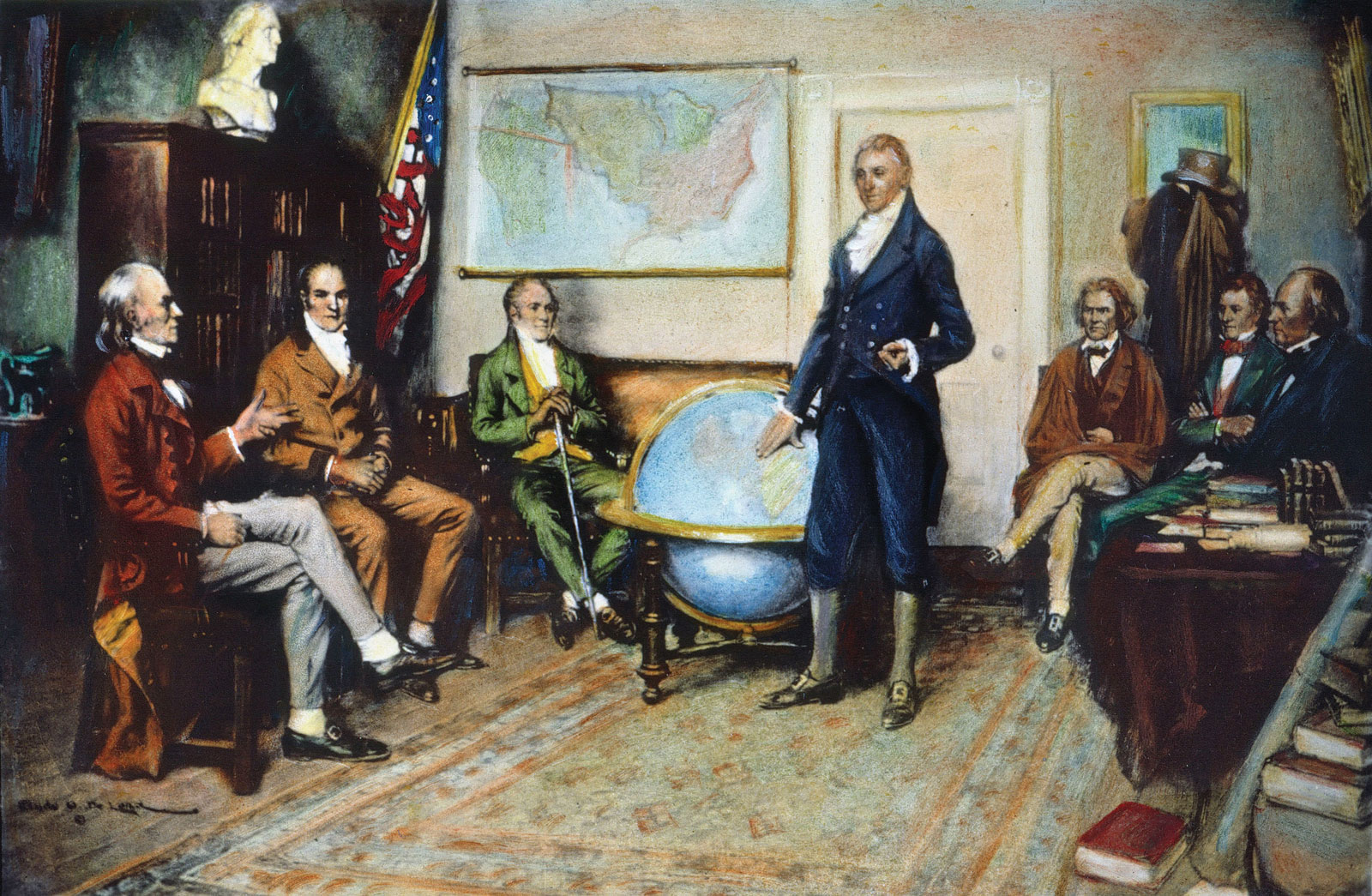
December 2: The Monroe Doctrine is introduced by U.S. President James Monroe.

- October 5 – The Lancet medical journal is founded by Thomas Wakley in London.
- October 22 – Simón Bolívar writes to Paraguayan dictator José Gaspar Rodríguez de Francia to release his friend the explorer Aimé Bonpland under threat of invasion. Rodríguez never responds to the letter.
- November 3 – An explosion at the Rainton Colliery Company's Plain Pit mine at Chilton Moor in the north-east of England, kills at least 57 coal miners.
- November 7 – General Rafael del Riego is executed in Madrid for high treason.
- November 12 – The first Constitution of Peru is proclaimed, albeit it is almost immediately annulled by Simón Bolívar.
- November – According to tradition, William Webb Ellis invents the sport of rugby football at Rugby School in England.
- December 2 – James Monroe first introduces the Monroe Doctrine in the State of the Union address, declaring that any European attempts to recolonize the Americas would be considered a hostile act towards the United States.

=== Undated ===
- The first Anglo-Ashanti War begins.
- British expedition up the St. Clair River; site of Corunna surveyed as a potential capital for Upper Canada.
- Olbers' paradox is described by the German astronomer Heinrich Wilhelm Olbers.
- Work begins on the British Museum in London, designed by Robert Smirke, and the Altes Museum in Berlin, designed by Karl Friedrich Schinkel.
- The Oxford Union is founded as a student debating society in England.

== Births ==
=== January–June ===
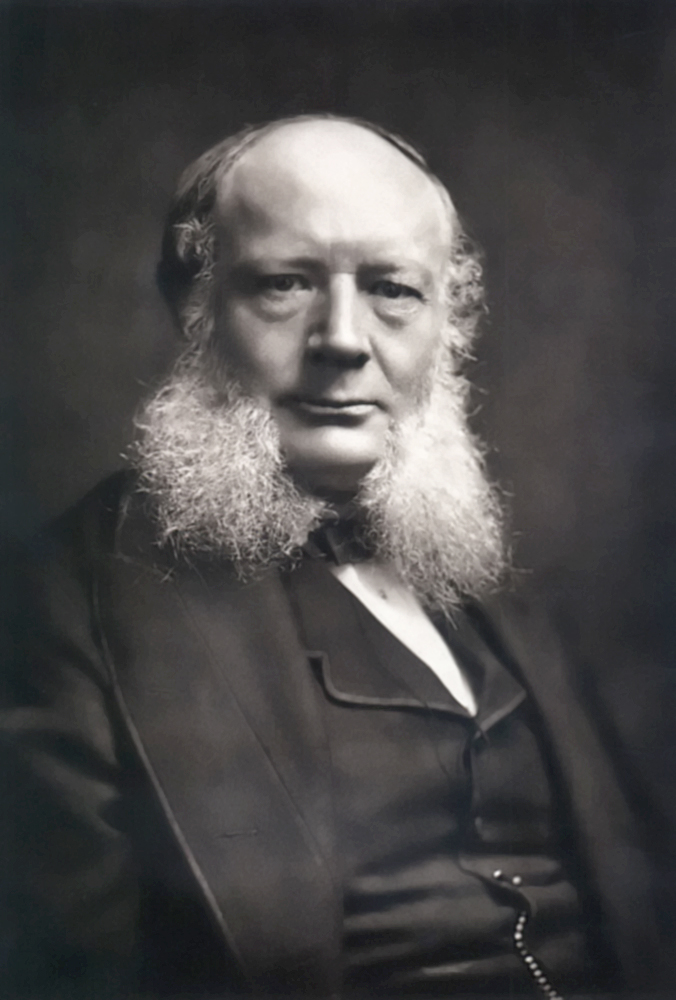
Carl Wilhelm Siemens

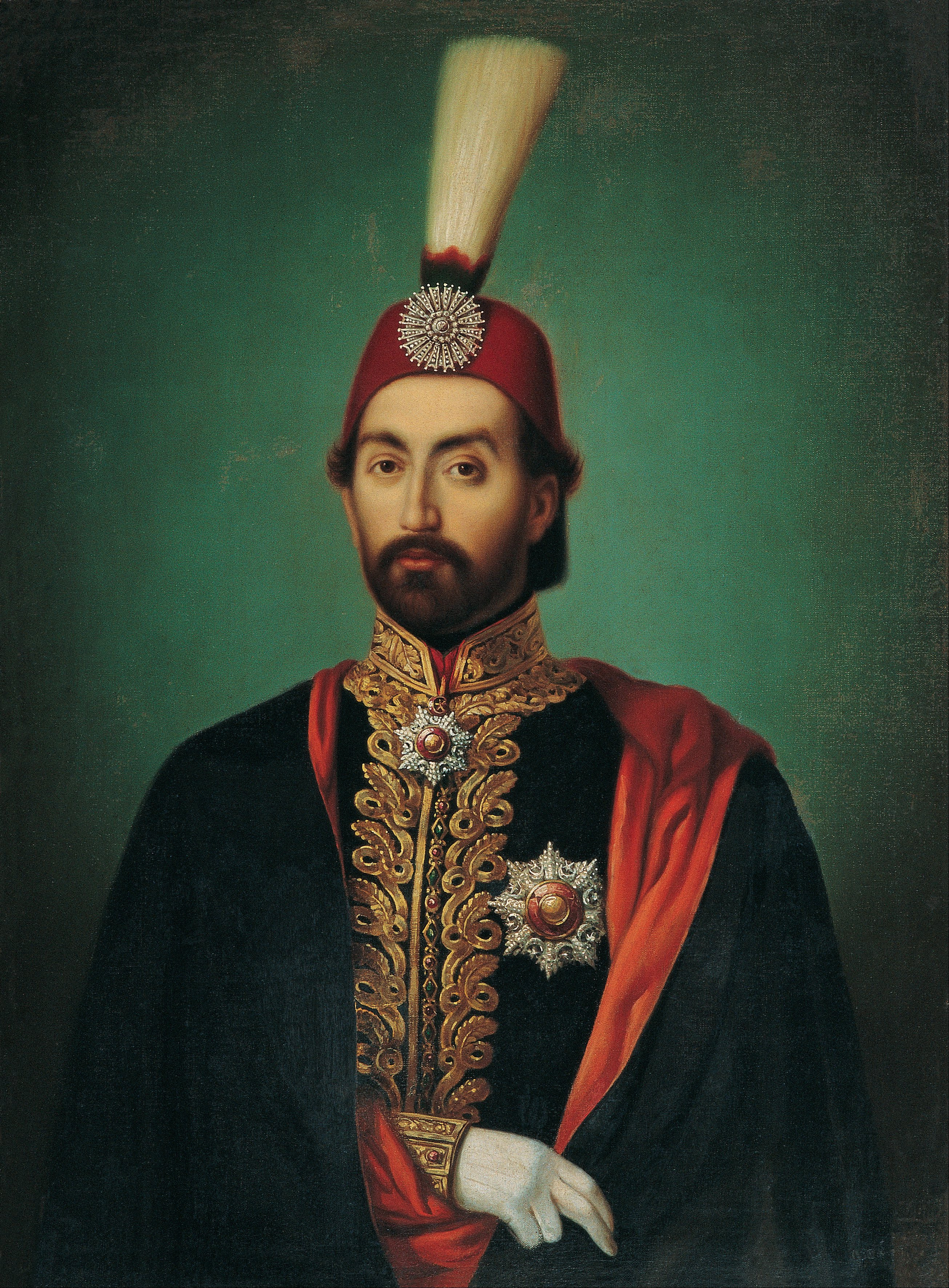
Abdülmecid I

- January 1 – Sándor Petőfi, Hungarian poet, revolutionary (d. 1849)
- January 3 – Robert Whitehead, English engineer, inventor (d. 1905)
- January 8 – Alfred Russel Wallace, British naturalist, biologist (d. 1913)
- January 11 – Pierre Philippe Denfert-Rochereau, French military officer and politician (d. 1878)
- January 27 – Édouard Lalo, French composer (d. 1892)
- February 15 – Li Hongzhang, Chinese politician, general and diplomat (d. 1901)
- February 28
  - Frederick Francis II, Grand Duke of Mecklenburg-Schwerin (d. 1883)
  - Ernest Renan, French philosopher, philologist, historian and writer (d. 1892)
- March 3 – John George Adair, Scots-Irish businessman and landowner; also known as "Black Jack" for his eviction of 244 people in 1861; financier of JA Ranch (d. 1885)
- March 8 – Gyula Andrássy, 4th Prime Minister of Hungary (d. 1890)
- March 14 – Théodore de Banville, French writer (d. 1891)
- March 18 – Antoine Chanzy, French general and colonial governor (d. 1883)
- April 1 – Simon Bolivar Buckner, American soldier, politician and Confederate soldier (d. 1914)
- April 3 – William M. Tweed, American political boss (d. 1878)
- April 4 – Carl Wilhelm Siemens, German engineer (d. 1883)
- April 24 – Sebastián Lerdo de Tejada, 27th President of Mexico (d. 1889)
- April 25 – Abdülmecid I, Ottoman Sultan (d. 1861)
- May 2 – Emma Hardinge Britten (b. Emma Floyd), English-born spiritualist (d. 1899)
- May 9 – Sir Frederick Weld, 6th Prime Minister of New Zealand (d. 1891)
- May 15
  - Thomas Lake Harris, American poet (d. 1906)
  - Youssef Bey Karam, Lebanese nationalist leader (d. 1889)
- May 17 – Henry Eckford, British horticulturist (d. 1905)
- May 22 – Solomon Bundy, American politician (d. 1889)
- May 26 – William Pryor Letchworth, American businessman, philanthropist, founder of Letchworth State Park, New York
- July 6 – Sophie Adlersparre, Swedish feminist (d. 1895)
- June 21 – Jean Chacornac, French astronomer (d. 1873)

=== July–December ===
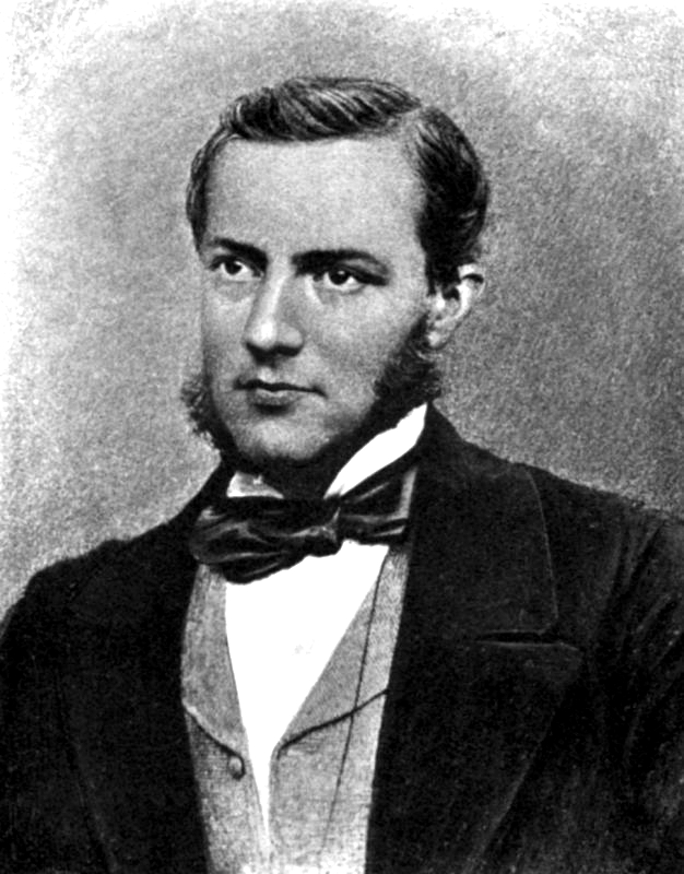
Max Müller

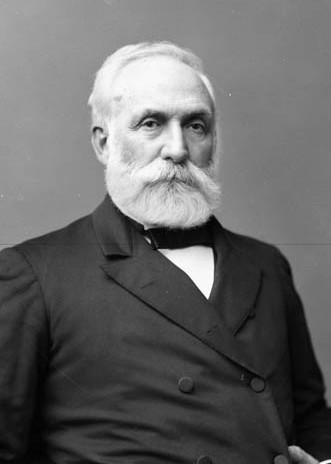
Mackenzie Bowell

- July 9 (date uncertain) – Phineas Gage, improbable American head injury survivor (d. 1860)
- July 18
  - Félix du Temple de la Croix, French Army Captain, aviation pioneer (d. 1890)
  - Leonard Fulton Ross, American Civil War general (d. 1901)
- July 23 – Coventry Patmore, English poet (d. 1896)
- August 3 – Thomas Francis Meagher, American Civil War general (d. 1867)
- August 4 – Oliver P. Morton, American politician (d. 1877)
- August 5 – Eliza Tibbets, mother of the California orange industry (d. 1898)
- August 10
  - Hugh Stowell Brown, Manx preacher (d. 1886)
  - Charles Keene, English artist, illustrator (d. 1891)
- August 11 – Charlotte Mary Yonge, English author (d. 1901)
- August 13 – Goldwin Smith, English historian (d. 1910)
- August 14 – Karel Miry, Belgian composer (d. 1889)
- August 15 – Orris S. Ferry, American Civil War general and politician (d. 1875)
- August 23 – Nil Izvorov, Bulgarian Orthodox priest and venerable (d. 1905)
- September 16 – Ludwik Teichmann, Polish anatomist (d. 1895)
- September 28 – Alexandre Cabanel, French painter (d. 1889)
- November 1 – Lascăr Catargiu, 4-time prime minister of Romania (d. 1899)
- November 8 – Joseph Monier, French inventor (d. 1906)
- November 16 – Henry G. Davis, American politician (d. 1916)
- November 18 – Charles H. Bell, American politician (d. 1893)
- November 21 – Andrzej Jerzy Mniszech, Polish painter (d. 1905)
- November 25 – Henry Wirz, Swiss-born American Confederate military officer, prisoner-of-war camp commander (d. 1865)
- December 6 – Friedrich Max Müller, German-born Orientalist (d. 1900)
- December 9 – Rosalie Olivecrona, Swedish women's rights activist (d. 1898)
- December 13 – Ferdinand Büchner, German composer (d. 1906)
- December 22 – Thomas Wentworth Higginson, American Unitarian minister, abolitionist (d. 1911)
- December 27 – Sir Mackenzie Bowell, 5th Prime Minister of Canada (d. 1917)

=== Undated ===
- Manolache Costache Epureanu, 2-time prime minister of Romania (d. 1880)
- Julian Gutowski, Polish politician (d. 1890)

== Deaths ==
=== January–June ===
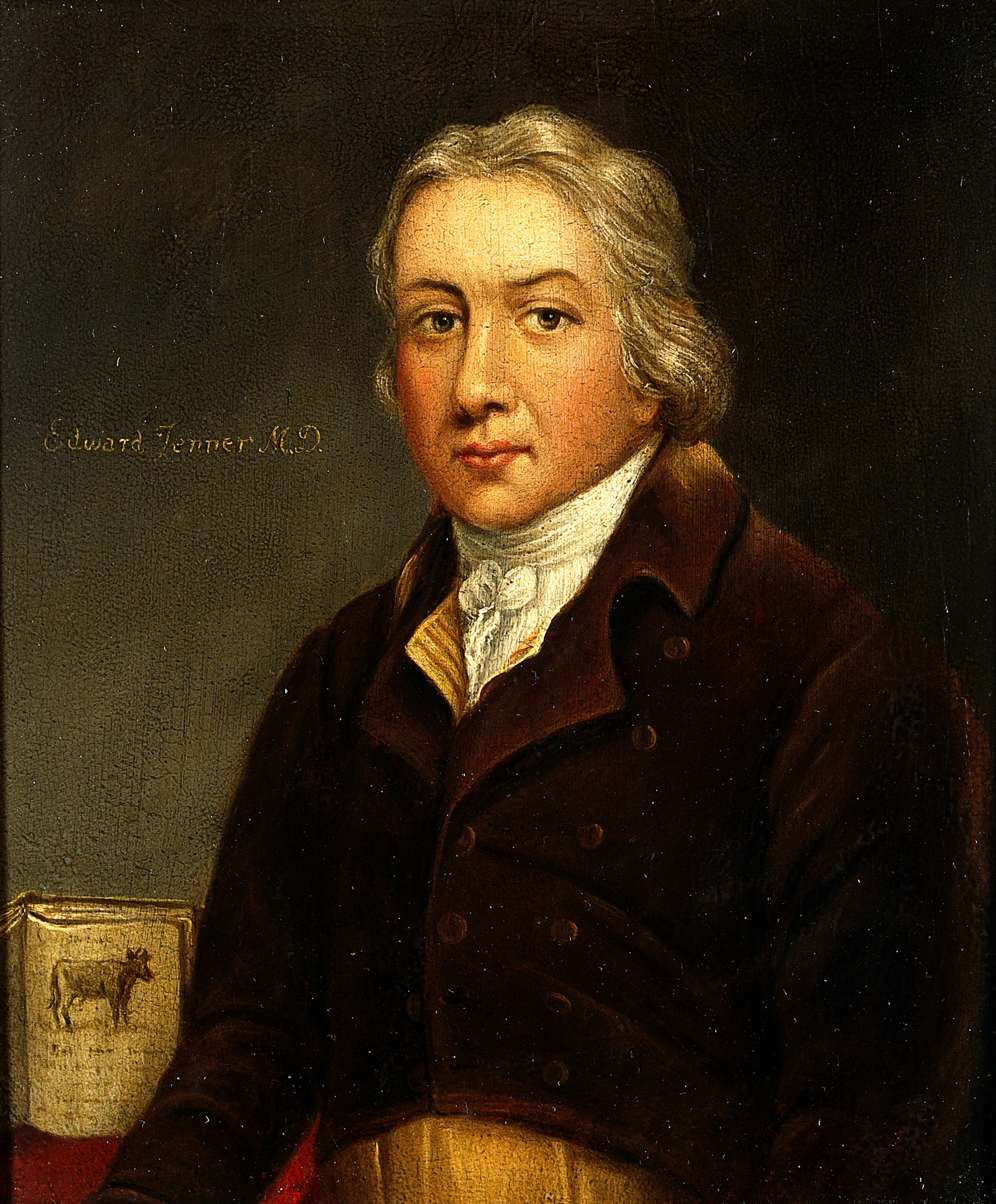
Edward Jenner

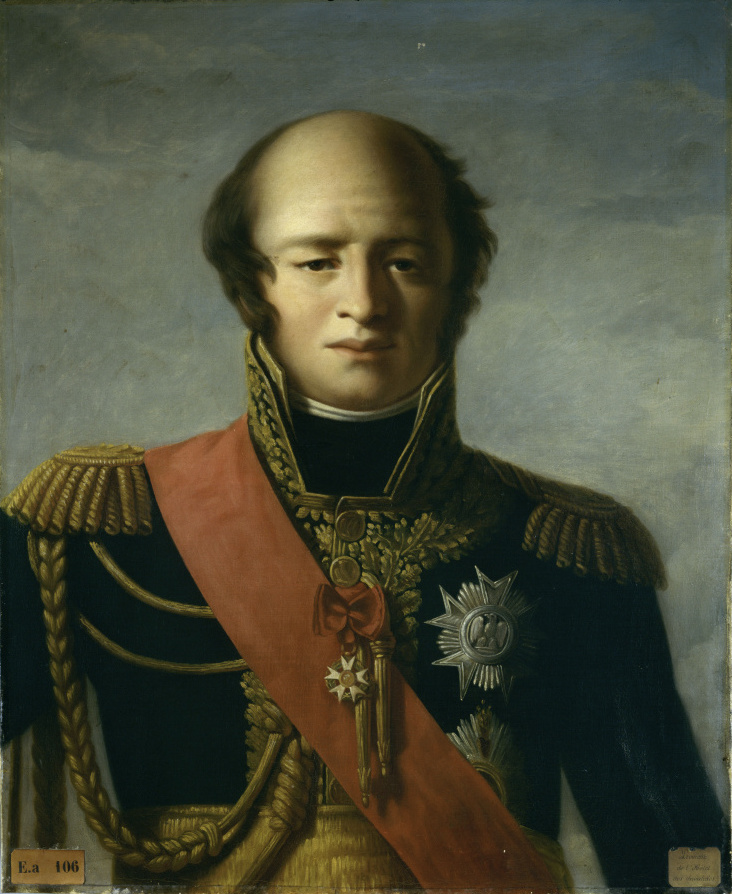
Louis-Nicolas Davout

- January 21
  - Gideon Olin, American politician (b. 1743)
  - Cayetano José Rodríguez, Argentine representative to the Congress of Tucumán
- January 22 – John Julius Angerstein, Russian-born English merchant, insurer and art collector (b. 1735)
- January 26 – Edward Jenner, English physician, medical researcher (b. 1749)
- January 27 – Charles Hutton, English mathematician (b. 1737)
- January 28 – Return J. Meigs Sr., American colonel (b. 1740)
- February 9 – Agnes Ibbetson, English plant physiologist (b. 1757)
- February 7 – Ann Radcliffe, English writer (b. 1764)
- February 21 – Charles Wolfe, Irish poet (b. 1791)
- March 1 – Pierre-Jean Garat, French Basque opera singer (b. 1764)
- March 5 – Magdalena Rudenschöld, Swedish conspirator (b. 1766)
- March 14
  - Charles François Dumouriez, French general (b. 1739)
  - John Jervis, 1st Earl of St Vincent, British Royal Navy admiral (b. 1735)
- March 18
  - Jean-Baptiste Bréval, French cellist (b. 1753)
  - Henry Brockholst Livingston, Associate Justice of the Supreme Court of the United States (b. 1757)
- March 19 – Adam Kazimierz Czartoryski, Polish aristocrat and patron of the arts (b. 1734)
- April 18 – George Cabot, American politician (b. 1752)
- June 1 – Louis-Nicolas Davout, French marshal (b. 1770)
- June 19 – William Combe, English writer, poet and adventurer (b. 1742)

=== July–December ===
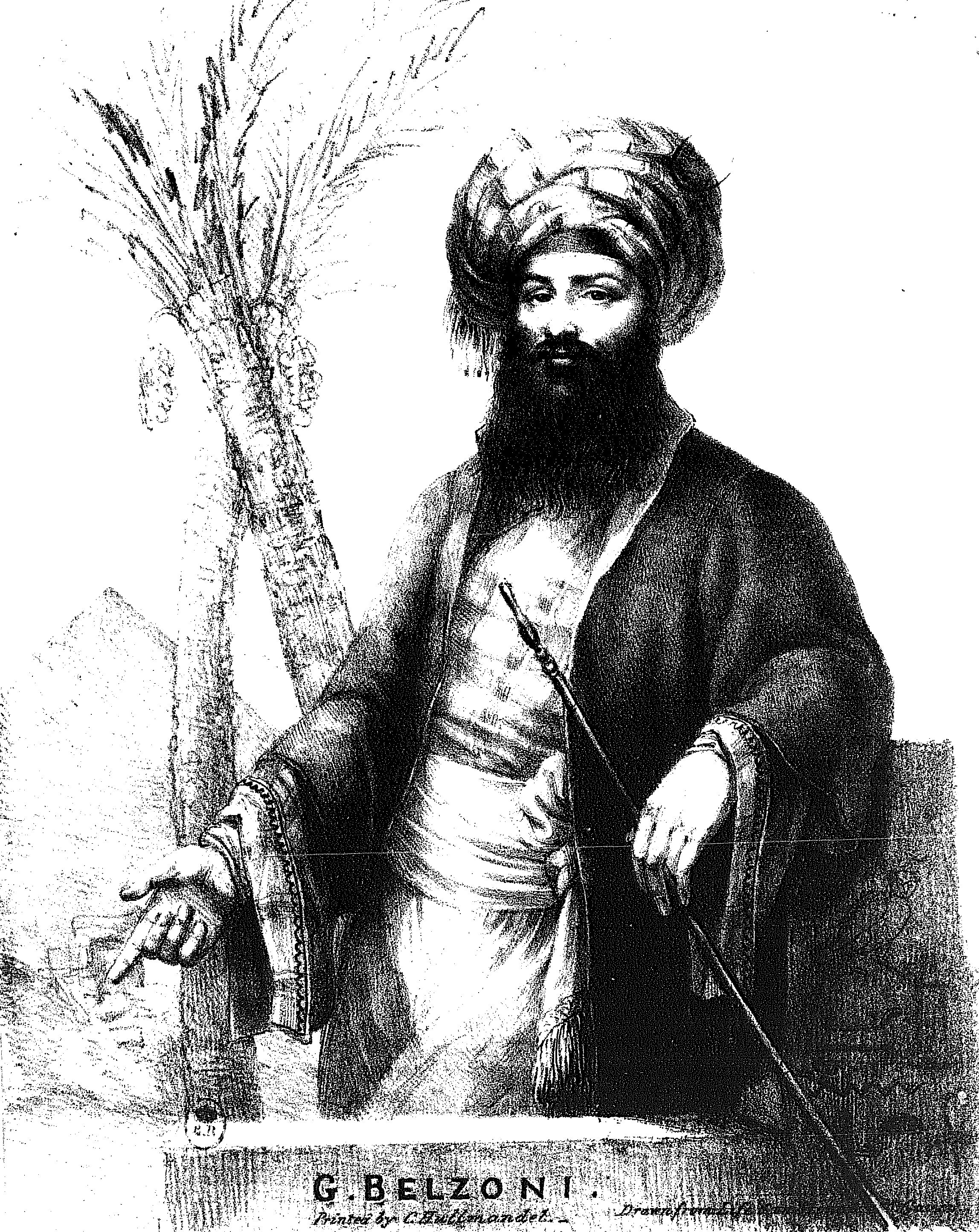
Giovanni Battista Belzoni

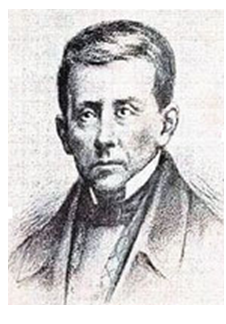
Gregorio José Ramírez

- July 4 – Estcourt Cresswell, English politician (b. 1823)
- July 8 – Sir Henry Raeburn, Scottish painter (b. 1756)
- August 1 – Francis Napier, 8th Lord Napier of Great Britain (b. 1758)
- August 7 – Mátyás Laáb, Croatian writer, translator (b. 1746)
- August 18 – John Treadwell, the fourth Governor of Connecticut (b. 1745)
- August 20 – Pope Pius VII, Italian Benedictine (b. 1742)
- August 22 – Lazare Carnot, French general, politician and mathematician (b. 1753)
- August 30 – Pierre Prévost, French panorama painter (b. 1764)
- September 11 – David Ricardo, English economist (b. 1772)
- September 17 – Abraham-Louis Breguet, Swiss horologist, inventor (b. 1747)
- September 23 – Matthew Baillie, Scottish physician, pathologist (b. 1761)
- September 28 – Charlotte Melmoth, English-born American actress (b. 1749)
- November 9 – Vasily Kapnist, Ukrainian-Russian poet, dramatist (b. 1758)
- November 11 – Richard Richards, British judge and politician (b. 1752)
- December 3 – Giovanni Battista Belzoni, Italian explorer, pioneer archaeologist of Egypt (b. 1778)
- December 4 – Gregorio José Ramírez, Costa Rican politician, merchant and marine (b. 1796)
