= Federation of European Carnival Cities =

The Federation of European Carnival Cities (FECC) was founded in 1980 and has been registered in the Court of Luxembourg. Member cities, organization, and individual members are engaged in producing popular celebrations or carnivals which represent an authentic masquerade or parade of a people's cultural identity. The General membership meets twice each year generally at the end of May and in October.

== History ==
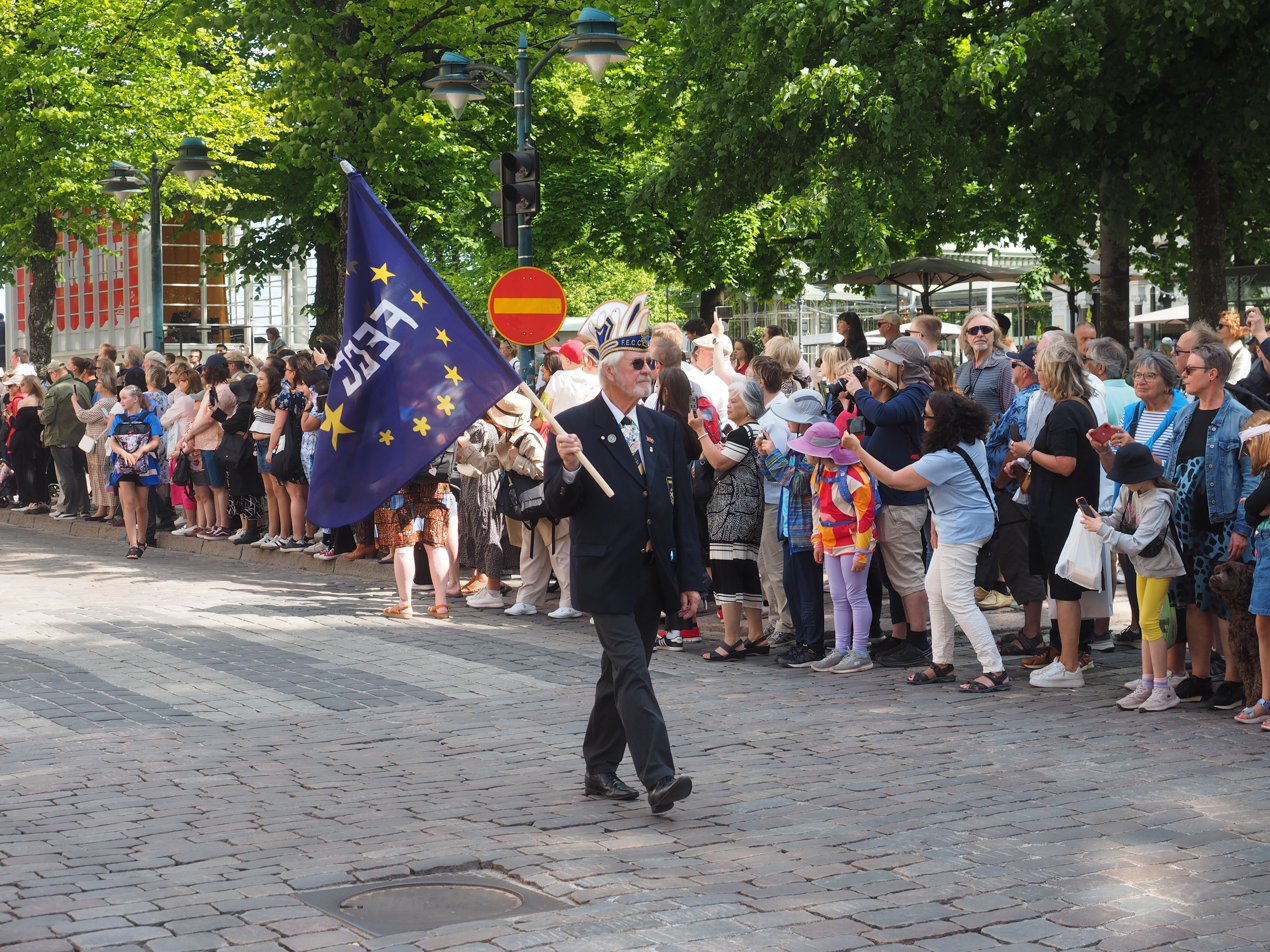
A FECC representative marching in front of the Helsinki Samba Carnaval in June 2025

On the occasion of the 700th anniversary of Amsterdam (The Nederlands), Carnival Princes from all over the world met each other in the Amsterdam RAI congress centre in November 1975. The Amsterdam Carnival Association, governed by Mr.Henk van der Kroon was called "Amstelpieren & Brokkerijders". The big event brought an unprecedented number of Carnival Associations from different countries together. The guests of honour included Her Royal Highness Princess Margriet of the Netherlands as well as diplomats and dignitaries from afar including Brazil, Greece, Germany and Belgium. This unique event is widely recognized as the starting point for the lasting contacts and exchanges between associations and cities that has become the FECC.

In 1980, international carnival associations met in Patras (Greece), again under the initiative of the Amsterdam Carnival Association Ämstelpieren & Bfrokkerijders. It is generally accepted that the FECC (Foundation of European Carnival) came into existence during this meeting. At the 5th reunion in Kos-Patmos (Greece), which took place in 1985, a membership was introduced and it was decided to drawn up rules and bylaws. The first countries that became a member of the Foundation were Belgium, Netherlands, Luxembourg, England and Malta. Articles of association were formulated and the creation of FECC was registered in the Grand Duchy of Luxembourg. Directly following the 1987 7th reunion in Malta, the Belgian members founded their own section FECC-Belgium with its own governing board. In 1988, FECC-Germany founded their own section as did FECC-Netherlands and FECC –Luxembourg. The first elected International President was Mr. Henk van der Kroon.

Throughout the year the International President and other board members travel to member cities and interested Carnivals to learn, educate and often officiate at the ceremonies surrounding what is often the most important annual event for the community and even country. The FECC is a global organization holding its first annual convention outside the Mediterranean in the twin island Republic of Trinidad and Tobago in 1987. Many Carnivals, particularly those in Eastern Europe, have grown up under the mentorship of FECC engagement. Since its founding, the FECC has been the only unswerving organization consistently speaking for the interests and concerns of Carnival organizations. Representatives from Carnival organizations in over 50 countries are members and annual conventions generally have several Mayors seeking ways to bring more international recognition and culturally oriented tourists to their festivals.

== Annual Carnival City Congress ==
Once a year, all FECC members: cities, associations and individual members are invited to an international assembly. This convention is organized by a member-city and takes place every year in a different country. The convention lasts 1 week end takes place between end mid-May and mid-June. These conventions enjoy a lot of interest: every year, participants from more than 20 countries are present. During these annual conventions, the members get an international forum which enables them to promote their carnival and their town on the occasion of seminars and workshops.

Direct personal contacts with the numerous participants can also increase the international publicity of a member's carnival and/of town. The organizers of the convention moreover, use these gatherings to show the participants a few tourist attractions and places of interest of their town and the surrounding area.

The 11 October 1980 marks the founding of the FECC and it is observed by the FECC membership with a "Dies Natalis" celebration. This weekend gathering is hosted by a member city.

== Conventions ==
Year	City/Country	Participants
1981, 1st	Patras Carnival (Greece)	17
1982, 2nd	Syros (Greece)	31
1983, 3rd	Cephalonia / Zakyntos (Greece)	66
1984, 4th	Samos (Greece)	35
1985, 5th	Kos / Patmos (Greece)	34
1986, 6th	Kalymnos / Leros (Greece)	31
1987, 7th	Maltese Carnival (Malta)	48
1988, 8th	Rep. Trinidad & Tobago and Barbados	92
1989, 9th	Sta.Cruz de Tenerife (Spain)	102
1990, 10th	Patras Carnival (Greece)	130
1991, 11th	Rosas (Spain)	132
1992, 12th	Aalborg (Denmark)	131
1993, 13th	Curaçao (Netherlands Antilles)	156
1994, 14th	Norrköping (Sweden)	102
1995, 15th	Maltese Carnival (Malta)	102
1996, 16th	Maribor / Ptuj (Slovenia)	81
1997, 17th	Aruba (West Indies)	116
1998, 18th	Strumica (Macedonia)	78
1999, 19th	Dubrovnik (Croatia)	108
2000, 20th	Carnival of Santa Cruz de Tenerife (Spain)	229
2001, 21st	Saint Petersburg / Pskov (Russia)	244
2002, 22nd	Kraków (Poland)	184
2003, 23rd	Ovar (Portugal)	252
2004, 24th	Pernik (Bulgaria)	132
2005, 25th	Nadur Carnival (Gozo (Malta))	450
2006, 26th	Novi Vinodolski / Rijeka Carnival (Croatia)	320
2007, 27th	Sousse (Tunisia)	395
2008, 28th	Ploermel (France)	285
2009, 29th	[[Kotor - Budva - Tuzi]] (Montenegro)	198
2010, 30th	Patras (Greece)	92
2011, 31st	Vrnjačka Banja (Serbia)	156
2012, 32nd	Prileb (Macedonia)	115
2013, 33rd	Yambol (Bulgaria)	118
2014, 34th	Limassol (Cypres)	125
2015, 35th	Bol (Croatia)	140
2016, 36th	Cottbus (Germany)	132
2017, 37th	Valletta (Malta)	142
2018, 38th	Šabac (Serbia)	167
2019, 39th	Yalova (Turkey)	116
2020, 40th	Ptuj (Slovenia)	Unfortunately cancelled (COVID-19)
2021, 41st	Ptuj (Slovenia)	Unfortunately cancelled (COVID-19)
2022, 42nd	Pétange (Luxembourg)	150
2023, 43rd	Leskovac (Serbia)	1

Also forthcoming

- 2024, 44th FECC Convention in Pernik, Bulgaria

== Structure ==
The FECC is open to membership in the following categories:

- Public bodies (municipalities, national art commissions etc.)
- Professional NGOs
- Amateur organizations

The structure is as follows:

- International General Assembly
- Presidium/ Board of Directors ( formed by national chairmen or representatives)
- International Executive Board (term of administration is 3 years)
- Audit Committee
- Senators (advisers) formed by former board members and prominent persons

The objectives are:

- exchange of knowledge concerning financing, fundraising and structures
- consulting organizations
- teaching and consulting construction of allegories floats
- motivation techniques for volunteers
- promoting carnival towards European institutions as cultural heritage
- organizing an annual convention
- collecting information concerning various carnival traditions
- exchange-programs for clubs/bands, especially youth
