= Fakawi =

Fakawi (2003). From left: Rueben Navarro, Mark Attard, Ryan Buttigieg, Paul Borg Bonaci, Antonio Ghio

Fakawi is a Maltese glam cover band active since the late 1990s.

The current line-up is Paul (in Maltese, Pawlu) Borg Bonaci, lead vocals and guitar, Antonio Ghio, bass and backing vocals, Mark Attard, keyboards, Rueben Navarro, drums and Ryan Buttigieg, percussions.

The original line-up included Fabrizio Giorgio on drums replaced by Navarro in 2003 when Giorgio moved to Australia to pursue a degree in Commercial Music Performance (percussion).

Fakawi have featured annually as the closing act on the Rock Stage at the Farsons Beer Festival. The band has also become a regular performer at the yearly Nadur Carnival held on Malta's sister island, Gozo.

Frontman Paul Borg Bonaci performs with other musical acts in Malta such as Xirka Rock (with Fakawi keyboardist Mark Attard) and impersonates the comical character Johnny l-kajboj on the national TV talk show Xarabank.
