= Maltese Carnival =

Event held before Ash Wednesday in Malta

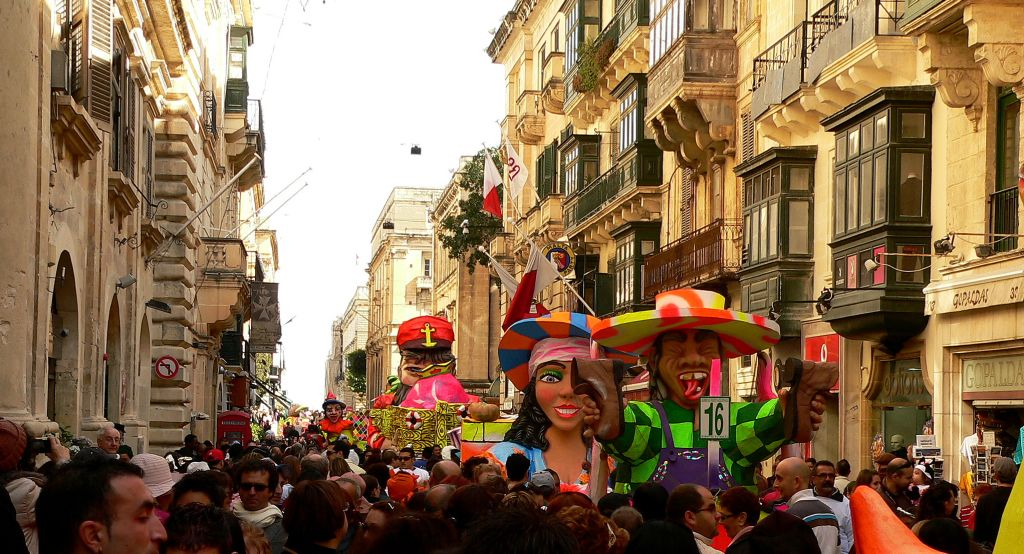
Carnival Trucks in Valletta in 2010

Carnival (Maltese: il-Karnival ta' Malta) has had an important place on the Maltese cultural calendar for just under five centuries, having been celebrated since at least the mid-15th century. Carnival has been a prominent celebration in the islands since the rule of Grand Master Piero de Ponte in 1535.

The carnival is held during the week leading up to Ash Wednesday, and typically includes masked balls, fancy dress and grotesque mask competitions, lavish late-night parties, a colourful, ticker-tape parade of allegorical floats presided over by King Carnival (Maltese: ir-Re tal-Karnival), marching bands and costumed revellers.

== History ==
Maltese carnival has been celebrated since the 1400s. The general awakening for carnival tradition has been since 1535, five years after the arrival of the Order of St John, during the reign of Piero de Ponte. It started taking place officially in Birgu. where a number of knights played games and displayed their skills in various pageants and tournaments.

Grand Master Piero de Ponte complained that some knights had exaggerated in their banquets and masquerades, and there were numerous abuses and brawls. At the general assembly of knights a week later, De Ponte made it clear that he would no longer tolerate any wild excesses, especially since they came from members of a religious community. He limited himself to approving tournaments and other military exercises necessary to Christian knights to train themselves for battle against the Turks.

In 1560, Grand Master Jean Parisot de Valette, felt he had to reprimand his knights for going overboard with their festivities. He had allowed the wearing of masks in public (which was forbidden in Malta for the rest of the year). The knights decorated the ships of the Order's fleet in the harbour and there was music, dance and rivalry as never seen in Malta before. La Valette was not amused at the number of people wearing masks, who had been invited to celebrate Carnival aboard the vessels and held up at the Grand Harbour in unfavourable weather conditions.

=== Lascaris Ban ===
In 1639, Grand Master Giovanni Paolo Lascaris issued a bando prohibiting women from wearing masks or participating in balls organised by the knights' auberges, on penalty of being publicly whipped. Another bando was that nobody could wear a costume to represent the devil. Neither the knights nor the women took kindly to the prohibitions, blaming the Jesuit Father Cassia who was the Grand Master's confessor.

Some of the most spirited decided to make fun of the Jesuits. While one of the dressed as a Jesuit with offensive writings on his back, four others dressed as scoundrels who pretended to beat him mercilessly. This was reported to the Grand Master, who had the knight Girolamo Selvatico from Padua arrested, as he was believed to have organised the satire.

It caused considerable unrest; the Jesuits' college was attacked and ransacked by young knights and force was used to help Selvatico escape from St James Cavalier. They demanded that Lascaris expel the Jesuits from Malta and close their church, which he did till things calmed down. Till date a Maltese idiom says "Wiċċ Laskri" ("Lascaris' face", that is, someone with a face like that of Lascaris) which is used to describe a nervous and sad person.

=== Knights' scandals ===
On February 27, 1664, Inquisitor Galeazzo Marescotti wrote that the traditional Carnival celebrations ended quietly that year because the knights were still mourning the death of their Grand Master Raphael Cotoner. In 1678, Inquisitor Ercole Visconti mentioned the "scandals" involving some knights during Carnival days.

The Maltese were scandalised by what they saw, leading the ailing Grand Master Nicolas Cotoner to take steps after listening to Visconti's complaints. And we are told that Cotoner wasn't easily scandalised in his early years as Grand Master.

On the second day of Carnival the following year two knights, named Gori and Saraceni, wearing masks, insulted Paolo Testaferrata, a depositary of the Inquisition, for no reason whatsoever. Inquisitor Giacomo Cantelmo complained to the Grand Master, who explained that it would be better to accept an apology rather than create any fuss. Saraceni went with two other knights to look for Testaferrata and excused himself saying that he had not recognised him. Than he called on Cantelmo to pay his respects.

=== Parata ===
True to an age-old tradition, Carnival was ushered in by the Parata which was taken very seriously both by the knights and the people in general as it was of special significance in the history of this festival.

It was customary for some peasants and later companies of young dancers to gather early under the balcony of the Grandmaster's Palace in Valletta and wait eagerly until they received formal permission from him to hold the Carnival. The most recently appointed Knight Grand Cross would obtain the necessary permission and a proclamation giving the go-ahead to Carnival was immediately read from the Palace balcony.

This was the sign for the general merriment to start, and the companies dressed as Christians and Turks performed a mock fight recalling the Great Siege of 1565. Then a child representing with a flag was carried shoulderhigh and taken around the streets of Valletta.

Meanwhile, a stone would be hung from the Castellania, or Palace of Justice (now the Ministry of Health, in Merchants Street), as a sign that justice was "suspended" for the three days of Carnival.

Inquisitor Fabrizio Serbelloni tells us that he was invited by Grand Master Antonio Manoel de Vilhena (1722–1736) to enjoy the last day of Carnival from the palace. "It was a popular feast attended by the Bishop and many Knights Grand Cross." In fact, the Sunday afternoon défilé was usually led by the Grand Master's carriage flanked by cavalry marching to the beating of drums.

Then followed other decorated open carriages, and finally came the decorated floats.

Grand Master Ramon Despuig (1736–1741) was asked by the Holy Office through the Inquisitors to dedicate himself to the Order's reform. But this was never taken seriously; indeed, certain knights were frequenting women of ill repute.

Inquisitor Luigi Gualterio (also spelled Ludovico Gualtieri) was not in the capacity to proceed against these knights but sent his spies to keep an eye on them. One novice, by the name of De Livry, used to organise dinners with these women. He was reported to the Grand Master, who admitted that he did not know what was happening in Malta. However the knight was arrested and he and another seven young knights, who was misbehaved during the last Carnival, were expelled from the island.

=== Kukkanja ===
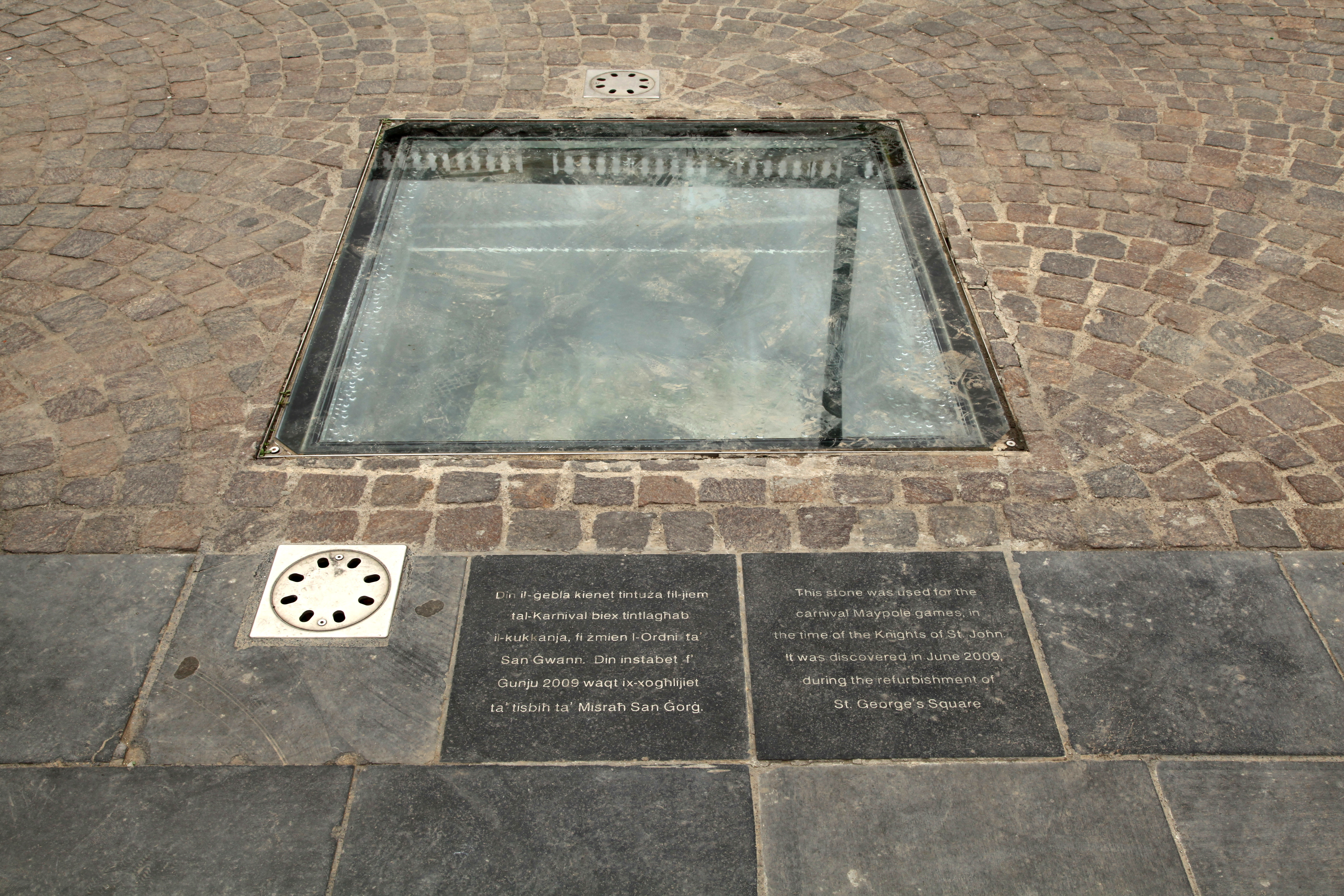
Remains of the kukkanja in situ, in which the pole was inserted

Grand Master Marc'Antonio Zondadari introduced the game of kukkanja (cockaigne) to carnival in 1721: on a given signal, the crowd assembled in Palace Square converged on a collection of hams, sausages and live animals hidden beneath leafy branches outside the guard house. The provisions became the property of those who, having seized them, were able to carry them off.

== British era ==
Carnival parades during the British period, especially in the 19th and early 20th centuries, were noted for their biting satirical themes, and many of the intricate floats were designed to poke fun at political figures and unpopular government decisions; however, political satire was essentially banned as a result of a law passed in 1936.

During the Carnival of 1823, about 110 children died in a human crush after attending catechism at the Convent of the Minori Osservanti on the last day of carnival.

Since 1926 carnival in Malta started to be centered in the capital city of Valletta, and saw the decline in other cities and villages, with the major reasons being the regulations set by the Carnival Committee and the participation prizes awarded by it.

== Today ==
The largest of the carnival celebrations mainly take place in and around the capital city Valletta and Floriana, however there are several "spontaneous" carnivals in more remote villages of Malta and Gozo. The Nadur Carnival is notable for its darker and more risqué themes including cross-dressing, ghost costumes, political figures and revellers dressed up as scantily clad clergyfolk. The Għaxaq spontaneous carnival is an original carnival organised by the inhabitants of this locality, where people wear masks and all the old-fashioned clothes that they can find in their wardrobe.

Food consumed during carnival includes perlini (multi-coloured, sugar-coated almonds) and the prinjolata, which is a towering assembly of sponge cake, biscuits, almonds and citrus fruits, topped with cream and pine nuts.

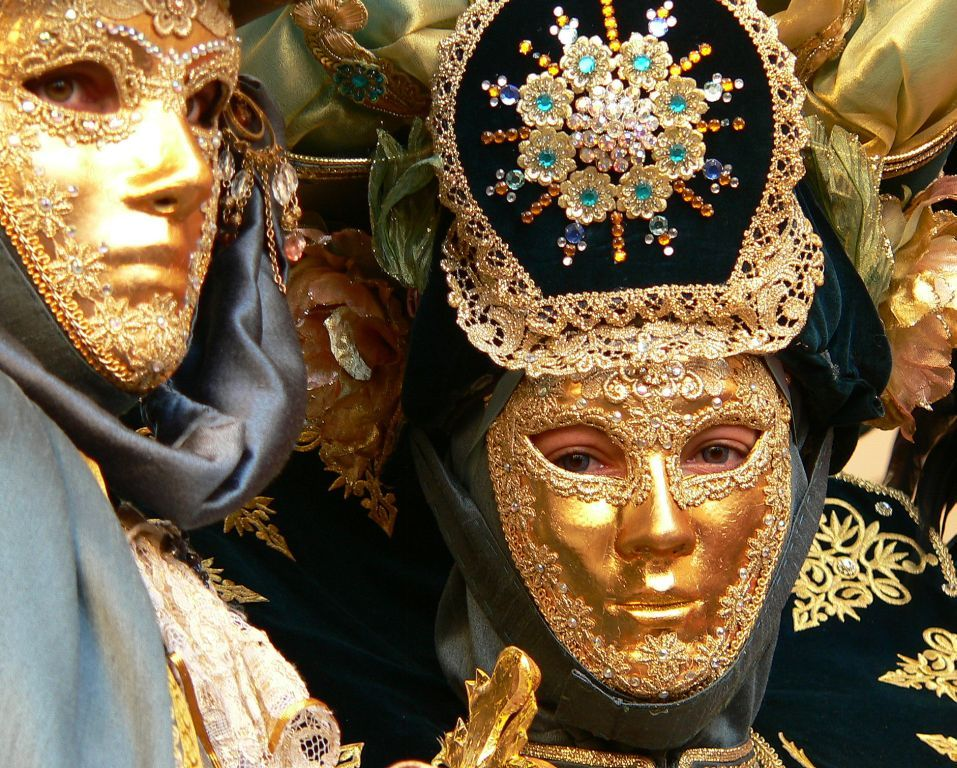
Fancy dress costumes

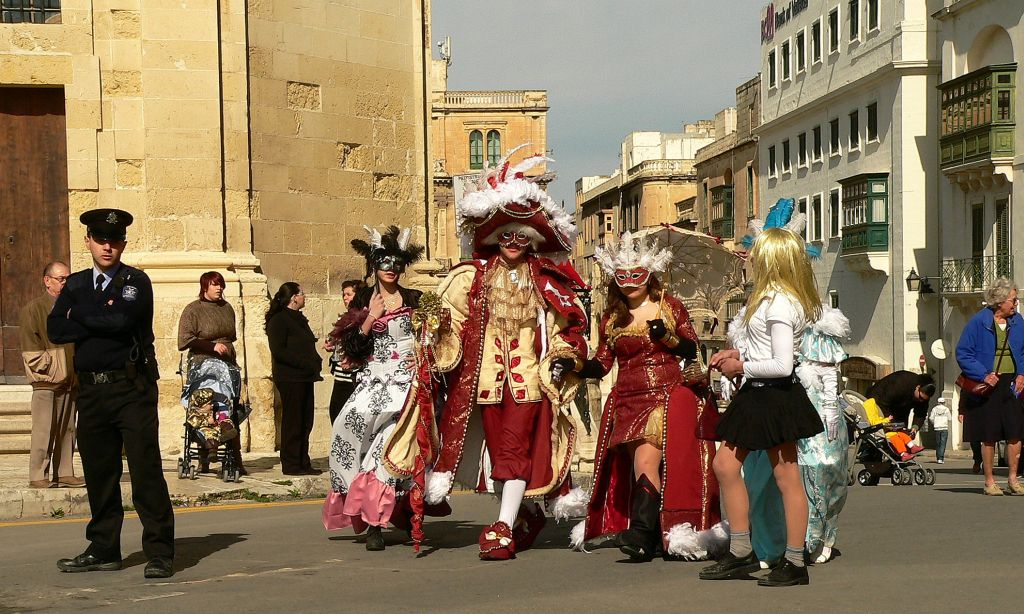
Carnival in Valletta

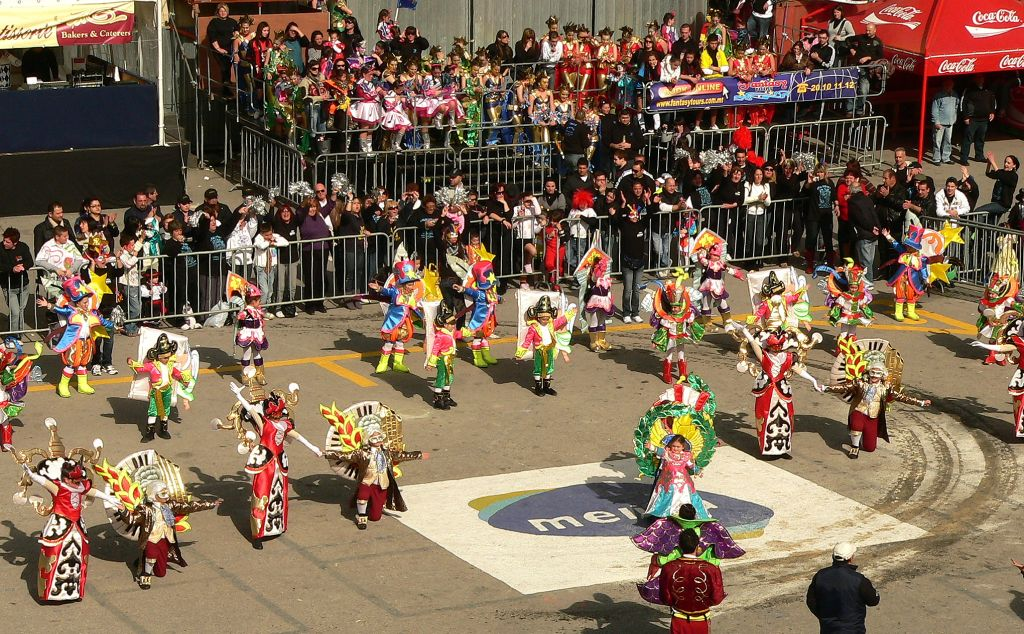
Carnival Show in Valletta

== See also ==
- Federation of European Carnival Cities
