= Patras Carnival =

Carnival in Patras, Greece

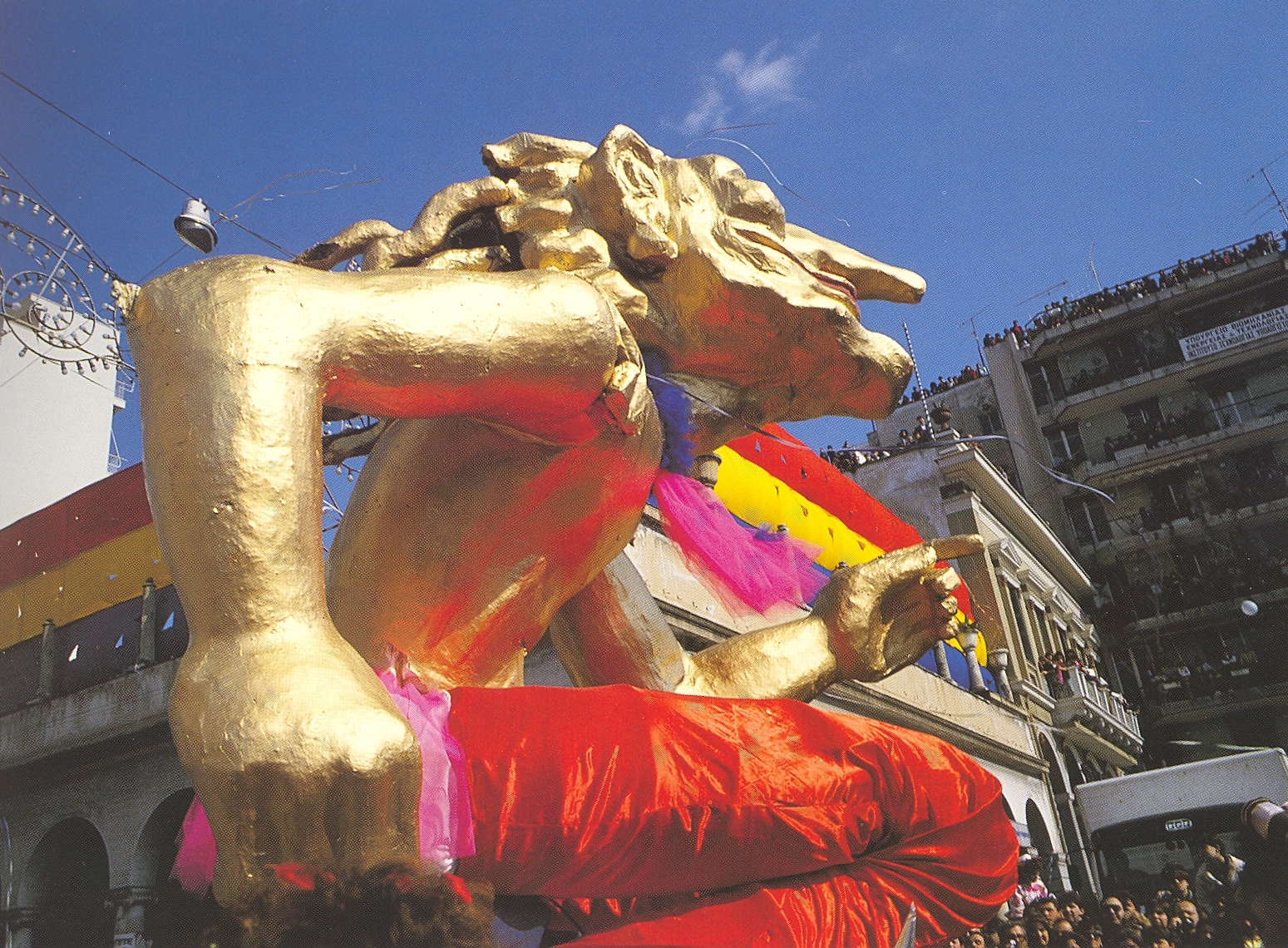
The Carnival floats during the Great Sunday Parade.

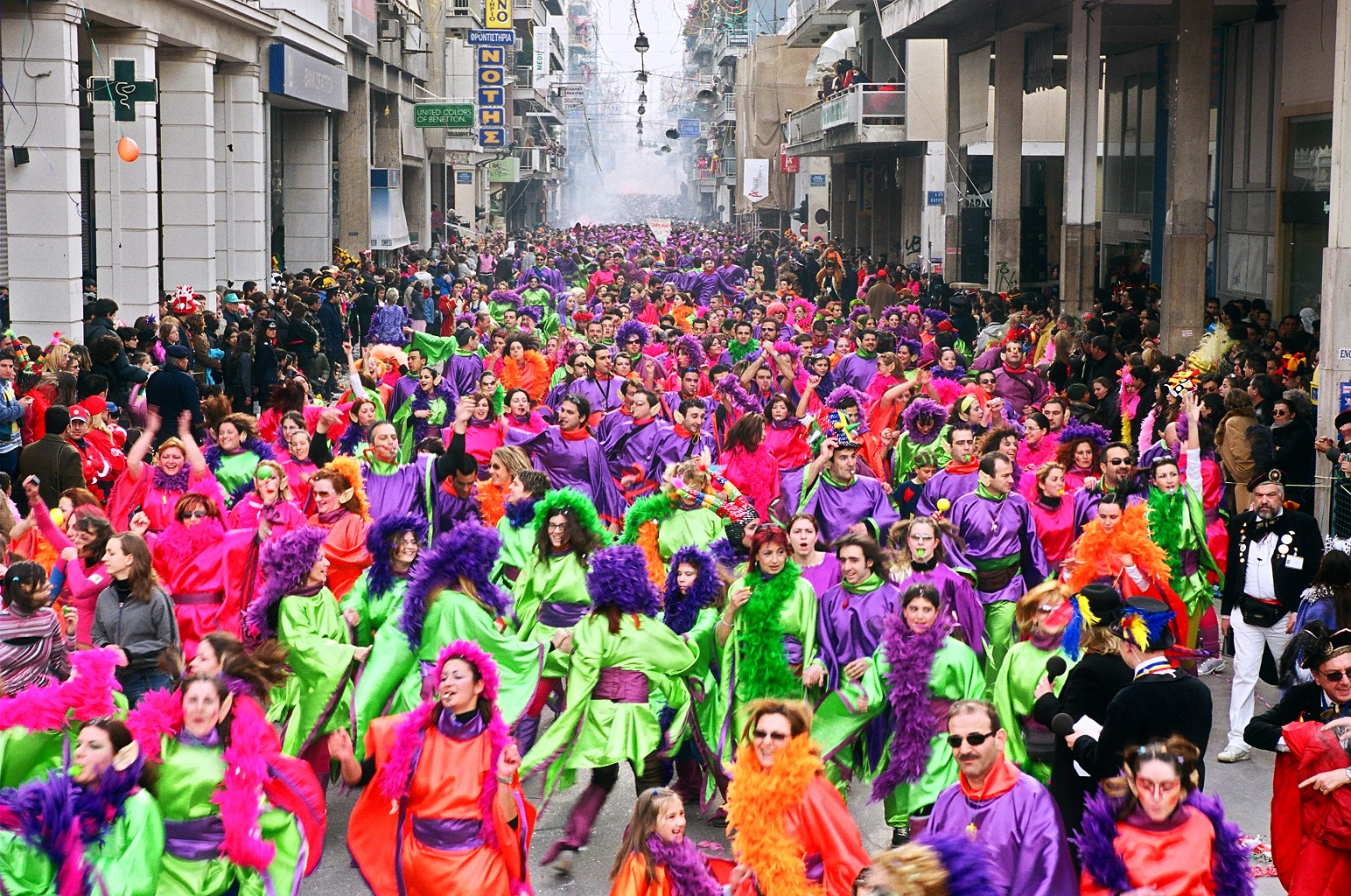
The Treasure Hunt groups, a Patras Carnival tradition.

The Patras Carnival, or Patrino karnavali, is the largest event of its kind in Greece. The carnival was first held in 1829. The events begin on 17 January and last up to Clean Monday. The carnival of Patras is not a single event but a variety of events that includes balls, parades, hidden treasure hunt and the children's carnival amongst others. It climaxes in the last weekend of Carnival with the Saturday evening parade of carnival groups, the extravagant Sunday parade of floats and groups, and finally the ritual burning of the carnival king at the St. Nikolaos Street pier in the harbour of Patras. Its characteristics are spontaneity, improvisation, inspiration and volunteerism. In 2019, there were about 750.000 participants.

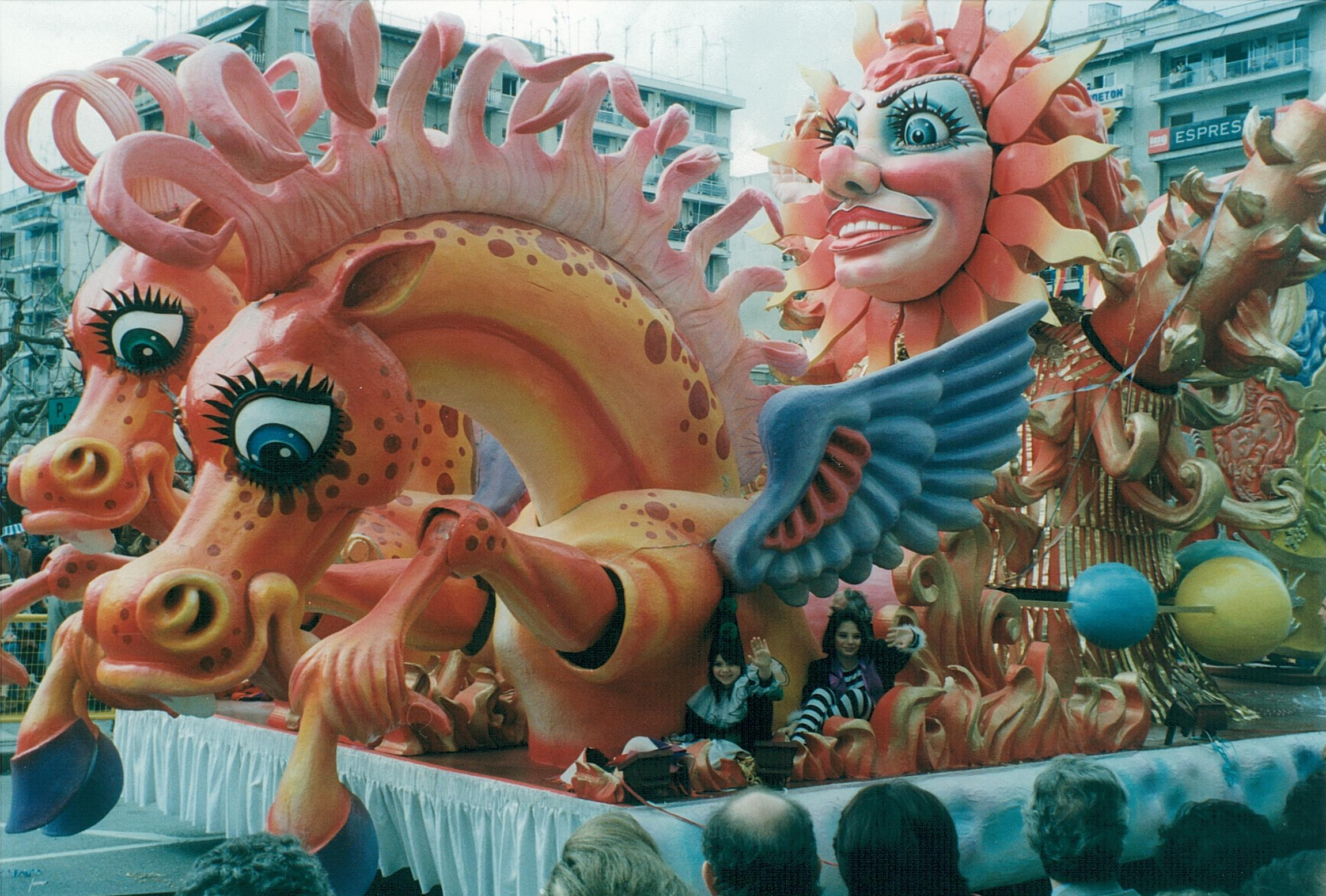
Patras Carnival Float 1995

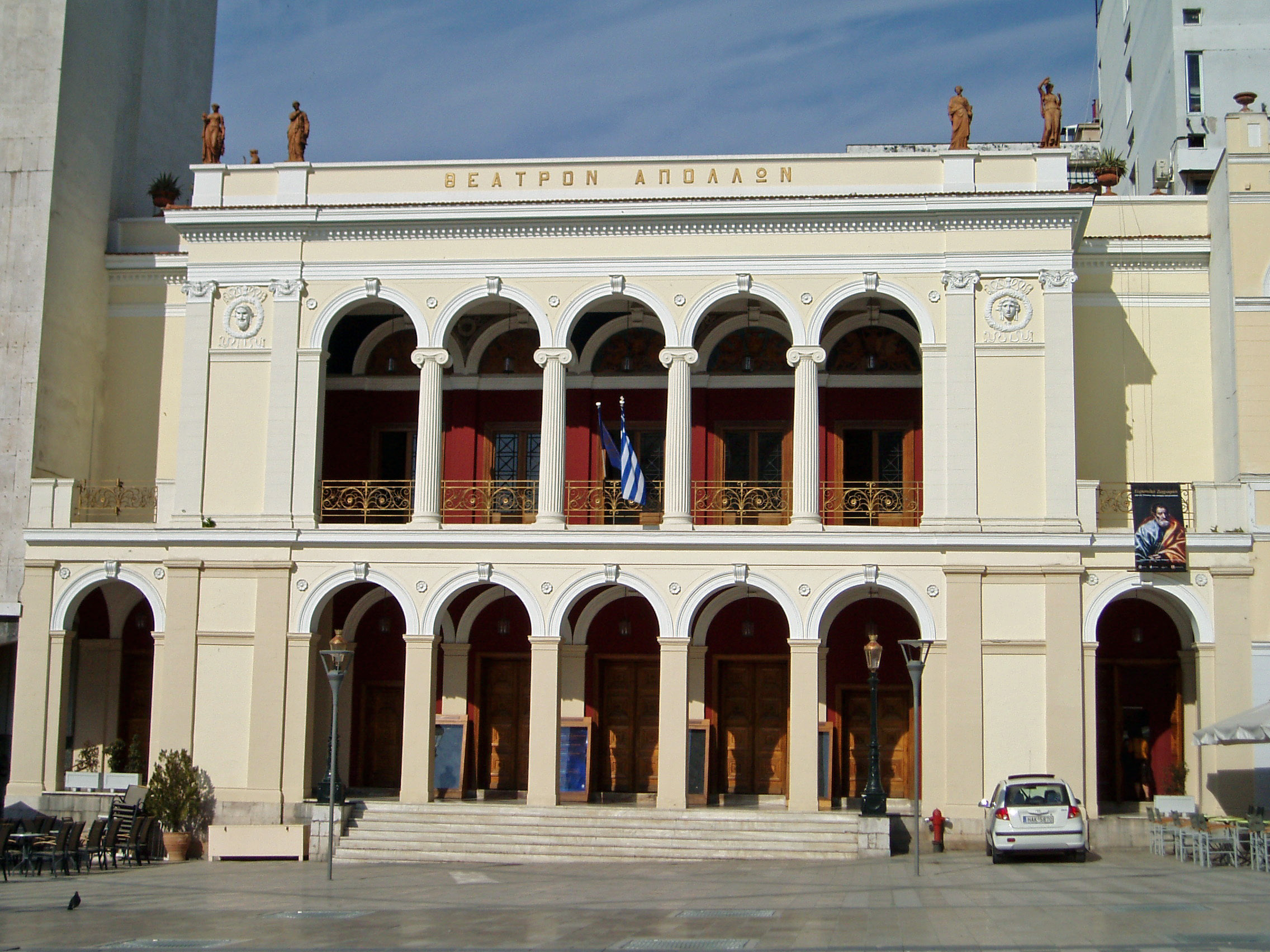
The Apollon theatre's external facade, emblematic of the Patras Carnival

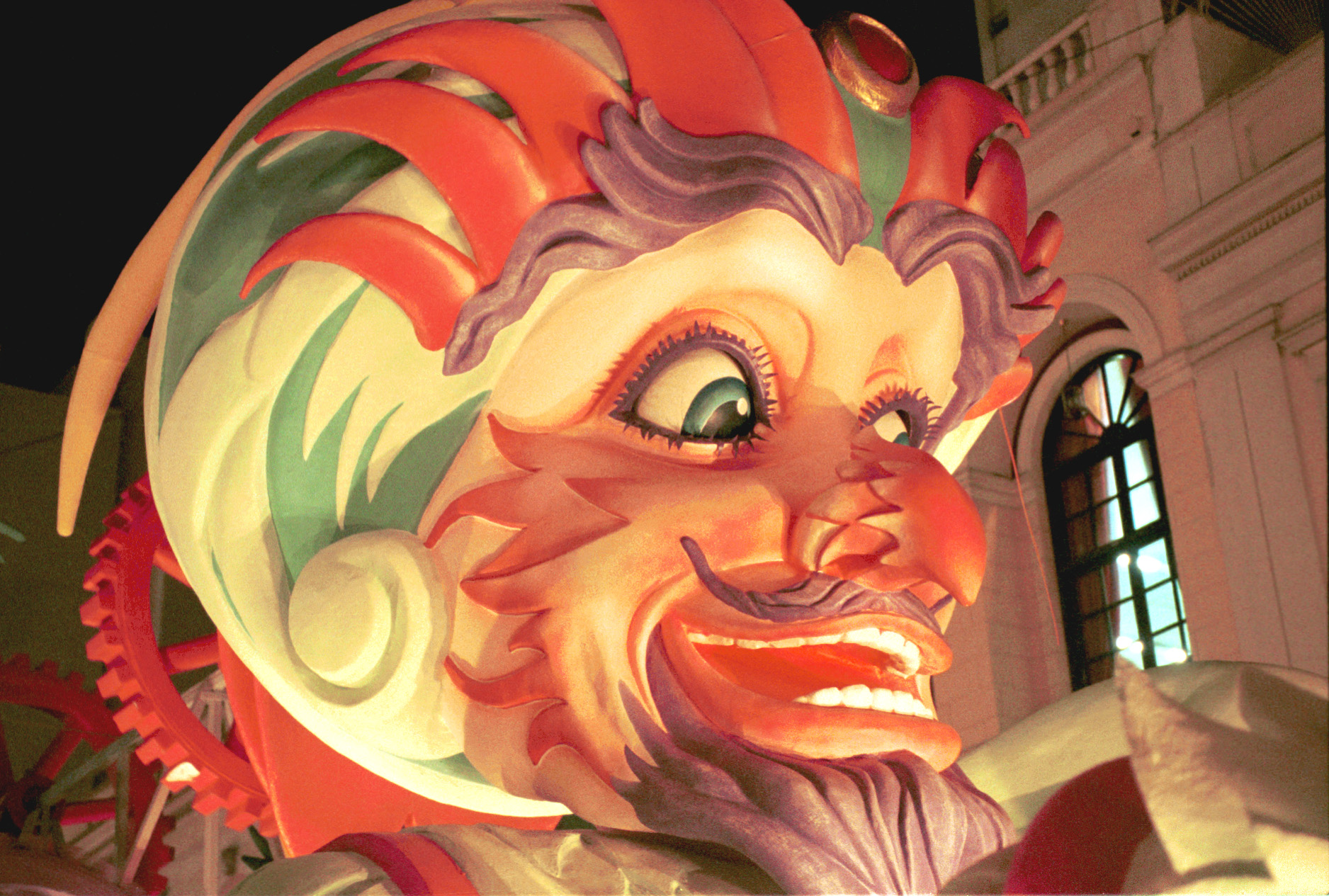
Patras Carnival, the King's float 2003

== The opening ceremony ==
Irrespective of when the Triodion falls, the three-week period preceding the first Sunday of Lent, it is customary for the Carnival of Patras to start on the day of St. Anthony (17 January). A town crier appears on the streets of Patras; in recent years this has been a specially constructed float with music. The crier announces the opening with a satirical message and invites the town's residents to assemble that evening for the opening ceremony in George square. During a spectacular celebration with elements of surprise, as the programme is kept secret till the last moment, the start of the Patras Carnival is declared by the town's mayor from the first floor balcony of the Apollon theatre. The programme usually includes pantomimes and patters, dances, music and fireworks.

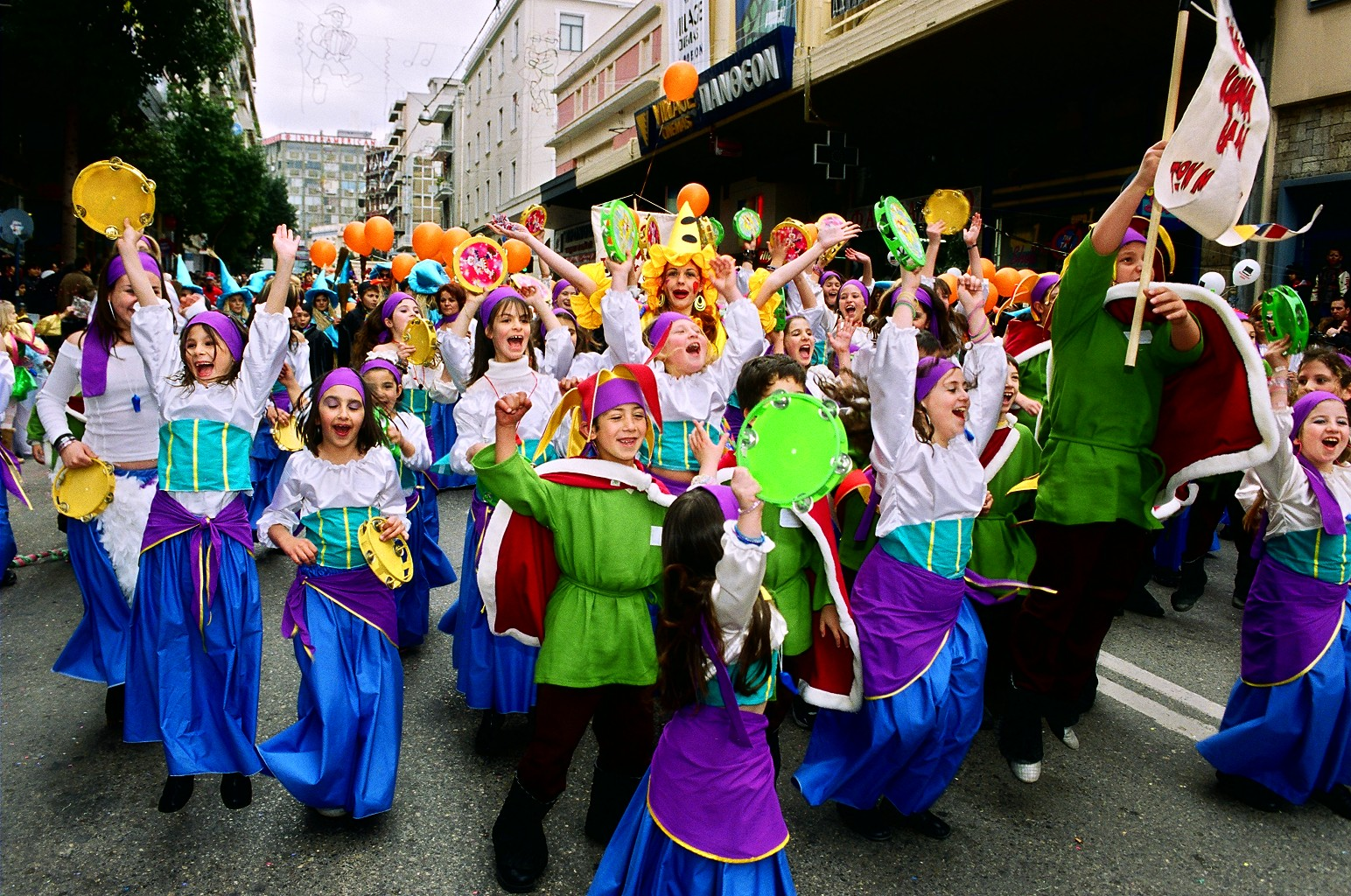
Children in action

== The Treasure Hunt Game ==
The groups that participate in the carnival are composed of either permanent carnival companions, groups of friends, colleagues or neighbours. They have a name as a group and a theme for their costumes. Depending on their carnival term, member's education, and the time they have available they choose whether they will participate in the treasure hunt games or the parades or both. These games comprise questions from subjects such as history, philosophy, mathematics, or from practical knowledge, exercises in navigation through hidden clues spread throughout the town, artistic competitions in painting, pantomimes, theatrical highlights or whatever else the organisers of the game can think of. The group's performance in various phases of the game is scored and so the big winner emerges. Several groups have offices and clubs for the duration of the carnival period and many organise parties and dances or public events on streets and in squares. Some participate in the parade with their own carnival float constructed to match the masquerade theme of the group. The number of participants in a group varies between 50 and 300 people, sometimes more.

== The Saturday night parade ==
This is also called the "Nihterini Podarati" [Night Parade on foot]. In earlier years, only the Treasure Hunt groups could participate without their floats. However, the last few years every group is free to join. Night, bright lights, an overwhelming stream of people, colors and high spirits combine to create a spectacular scene.

== The Grand Parade ==
This is the climax of the Patras Carnival. The parade begins around noon on the Sunday before Clean Monday with numerous satirical floats constructed by the municipality followed by an endless stream of groups, each one with an individual theme around which their costumes are designed. Despite the constant flow, due to the number of people participating which in recent years has reached between 35 and 40 thousand, the parade takes several hours to complete. It cuts through the town and is watched by thousands on the streets, on balconies, in the stands and throughout Greece in a televised coverage.

== Closing ceremony ==
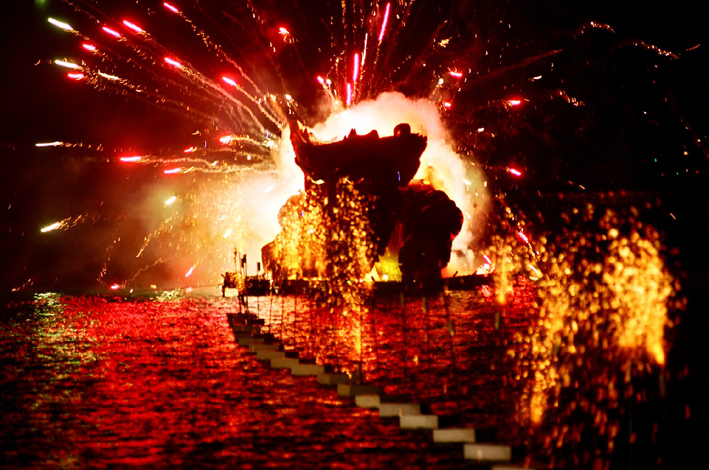
The burning....

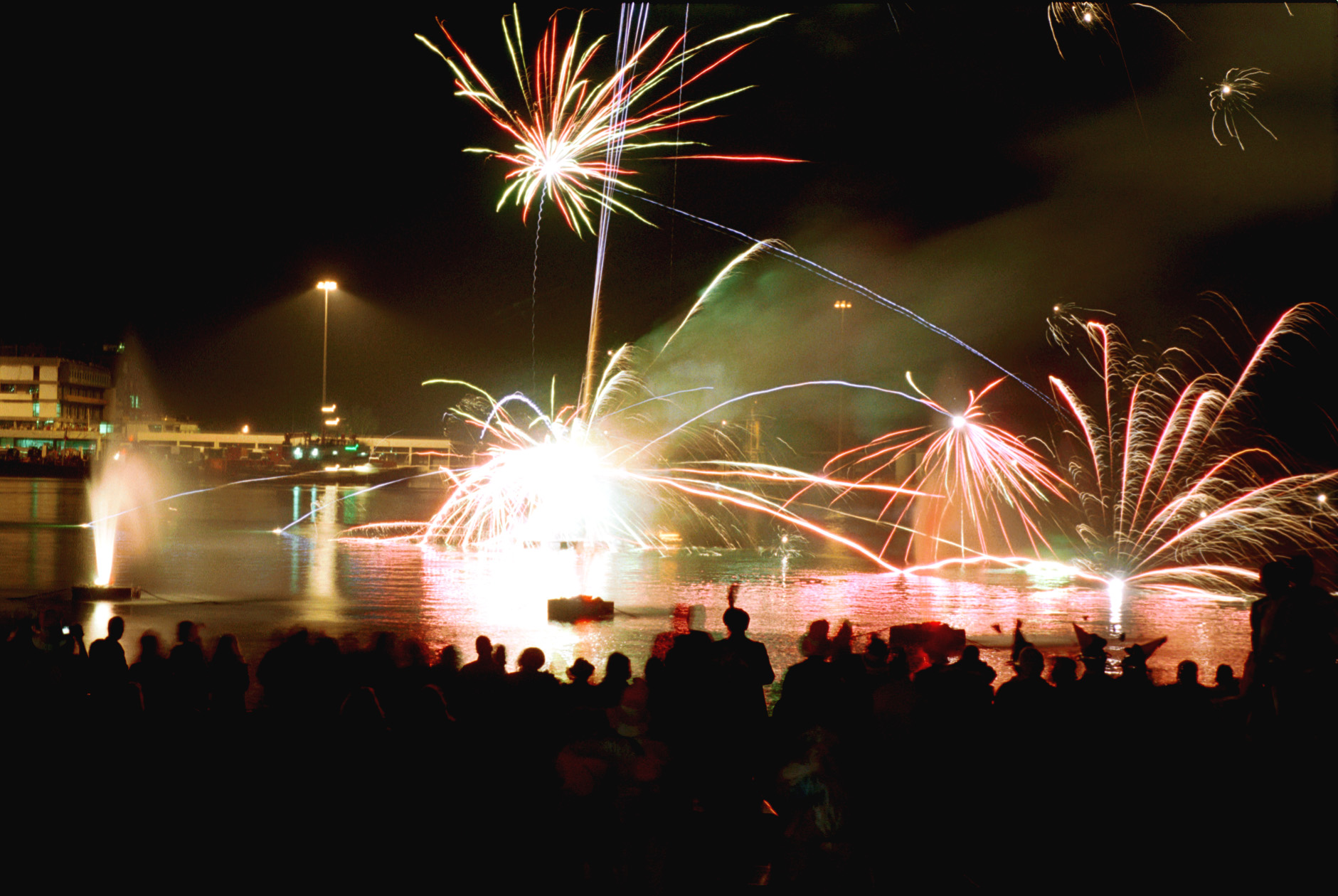
...of the Carnival King

An extension of the traditional festivities based around the burning of the float of the Carnival King, with concerts, dances, a farewell to the carnival past, announcements about the carnival to come and countless fireworks. It takes place at the port on Sunday night and is also broadcast on TV.

== Sources ==
- Νίκος Ε. Πολίτης, Το καρναβάλι της Πάτρας, Αχαϊκές Εκδόσεις, Πάτρα 1987. (In Greek)
- Νίκος Α. Στεφανόπουλος, Το... άγνωστο καρναβάλι της Πάτρας. Ιστορία και... ιστορίες, Τυπογραφείο-Γραφικές Τέχνες Σπ. Ανδριόπουλος - Ν. Γεωργόπουλος Ο.Ε., Πάτρα 2014. (In Greek)
