= Franciscan Church of St Mary of Jesus =

Church of St Mary of Jesus
- Knisja ta' Ġieżu
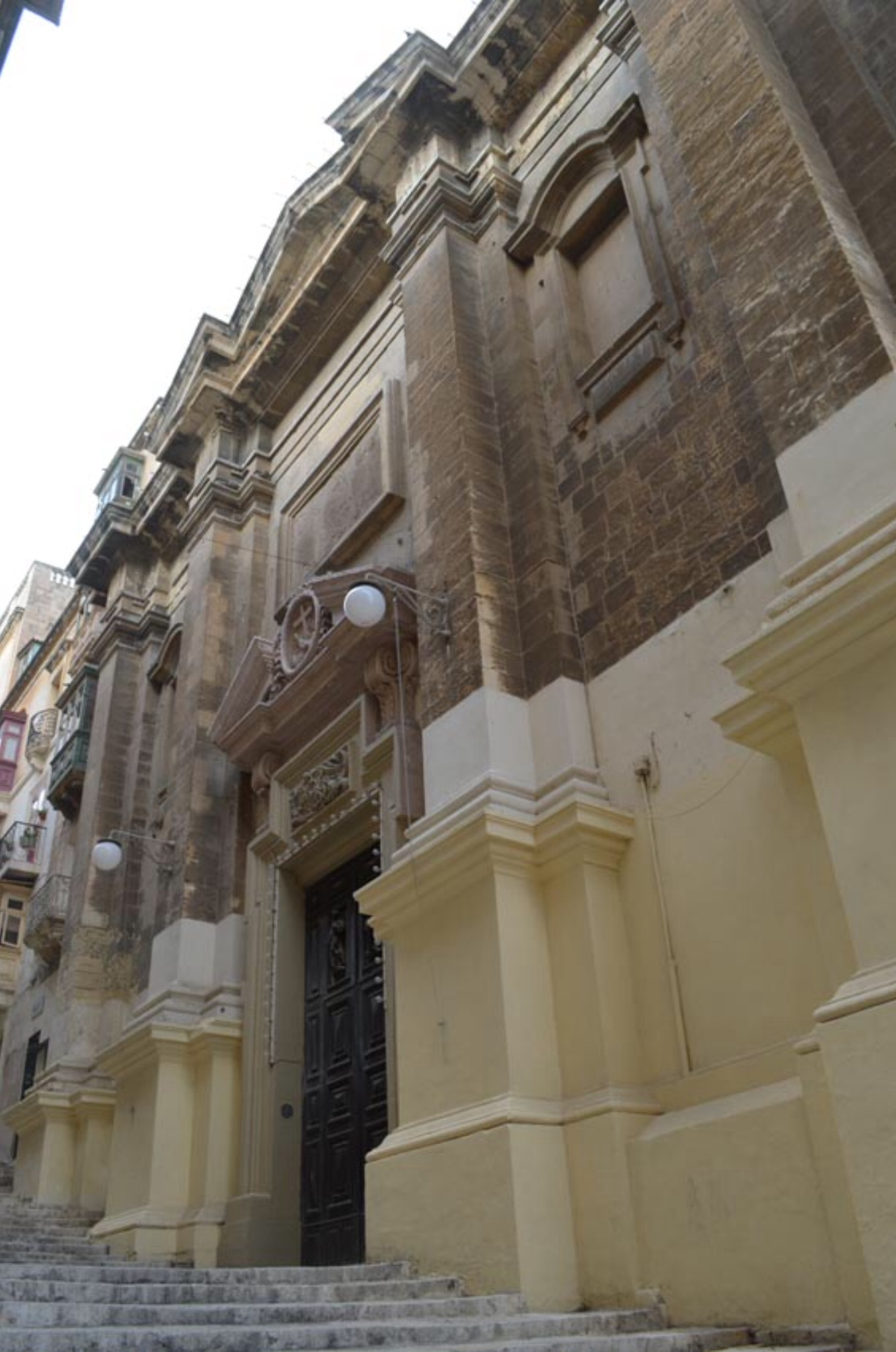
- Façade of the church

- Location within Malta
- 35°53′47″N 14°30′48″E
- Location: Valletta
- Country: Malta
- Denomination: Roman Catholic

History
- Status: Active
- Founded: 1584
- Dedication: St Mary of Jesus

Architecture
- Functional status: Conventual church
- Architect: Girolamo Cassar
- Architectural type: Church
- Style: Baroque and Mannerist

Administration
- Archdiocese: Malta

Clergy
- Archbishop: Charles Scicluna
- Rector: Joe Caruana

The Franciscan Church of St Mary of Jesus (Convent of the Minori Osservanti) is a church in Valletta, Malta, which is dedicated to St Mary of Jesus and is cared for by the religious order of Friars Minor. It came to be popularly known by the Maltese as Ta' Ġieżu. Ta' Ġieżu is a local corruption of Ta' Ġesù (of Jesus).

== History ==
In 1571 the Friars Minor were granted a piece of land in Valletta on which to build a church. Work began shortly afterwards, following the design of Girolamo Cassar. The façade was replaced in 1680 by Mederico Blondel. Numerous grandmasters contributed lavishly towards the embellishment of the church which now hosts various works of art.

The church is the location of the Carnival tragedy of 1823, when many boys were crushed to death in a corridor of the building while waiting to receive bread.

== Description ==
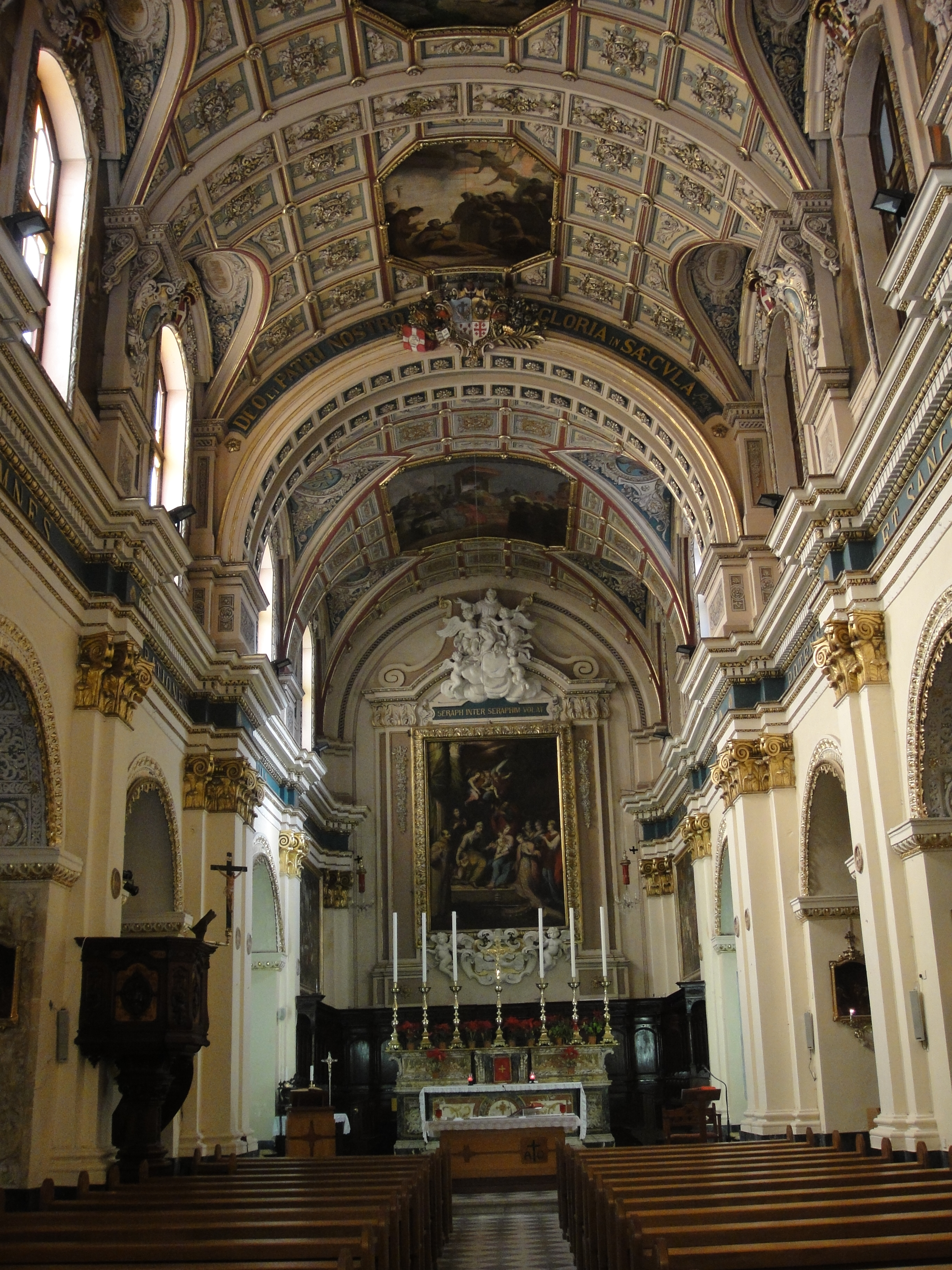
Interior of the church

The main attraction is undoubtedly the impressive Miraculous Crucifix (in Maltese: Il-Kurċifiss Mirakuluż), by the Sicilian friar Innocenzo da Petralia Sottana around 1630. It immediately attracted the attention of the people. Accompanying the crucifix is a painting of Our Lady of Sorrows by Stefano Erardi.

The titular painting is the work of the Sicilian artist Antonio Catalano. It is dated 1600 and depicts the Visitation of Our Lady to St Elizabeth.

The first victim of the 1813–14 plague epidemic in Malta, a young girl, was buried inside the church, at the lack of knowledge by everyone of the circumstances of her death.

The church hosts the grave of Blessed Nazju Falzon (1813–1865), a diocesan cleric greatly venerated by the Maltese, who taught Catholic catechism to British sailors stationed in Malta.

The church building is listed on the National Inventory of the Cultural Property of the Maltese Islands.

== See also ==
- Culture of Malta
- History of Malta
- List of Churches in Malta
- Religion in Malta
