= Carnival tragedy of 1823 =

Human crush in Valletta, British Malta

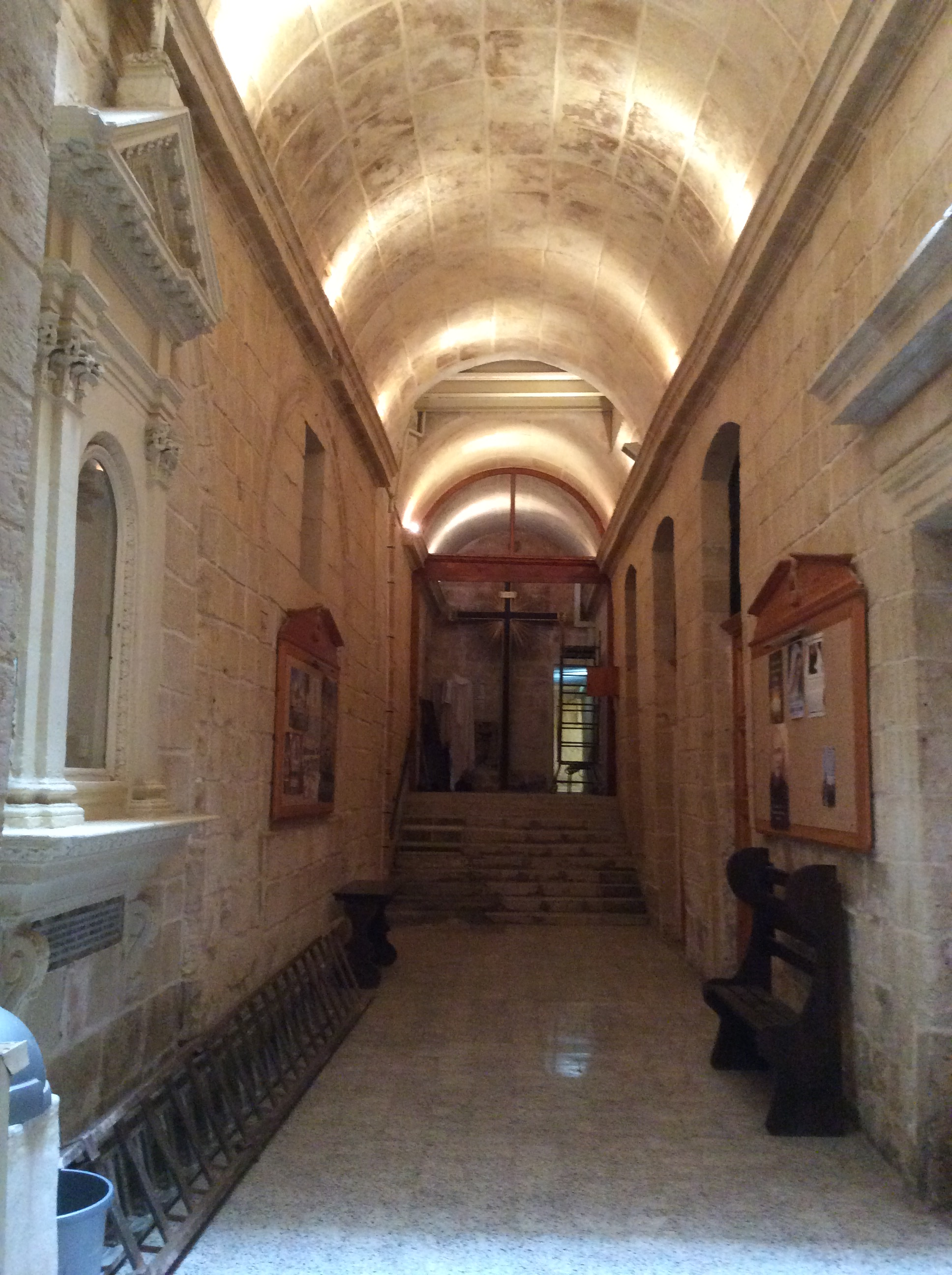
- The corridor with stairs where the incident took place, photographed in 2017
- Date: 11 February 1823
- Time: 18:30
- Location: Valletta, Crown Colony of Malta; 35°53′47″N 14°30′48″E
- Type: Human crush
- Deaths: c. 110
- Charges: None

On 11 February 1823, around 110 boys were killed in a human crush at the Convent of the Minori Osservanti in Valletta, Malta. The boys, who had gone to the convent to receive bread on the last day of carnival celebrations, were crushed after falling down a flight of stairs while trying to exit the convent.

== Background ==
During the early 19th century, the Crown Colony of Malta was experiencing a famine, and it had become a tradition to gather 8-to-15-year-old boys from the working classes of Valletta and the Three Cities to participate in a procession during the last few days of carnival. After the procession, they would attend Mass, and they would be given some bread afterwards. This activity was arranged by ecclesiastical directors who taught catechism, and its main aim was to keep children out of the riots and confusion of carnival.

This activity was organized on 10 February 1823, when children attended mass at Floriana and then went to the Convent of the Minori Osservanti (now better known as ta' Ġieżu) in Valletta where they were given bread. Everything went as planned, and the same procedure was planned for the following day.

== Disaster ==
The same procedure took place on 11 February 1823. Children were gathered and attended mass at Floriana, but the ceremony lasted an hour longer than usual. The children's procession to the convent in Valletta occurred at the same time as the carnival celebrations had ended, so they met with many people who were returning home. At this point, some adults and children from the crowd mixed in with the boys in order to receive free bread which was being distributed.

The boys entered one of the convent's corridors from the vestry door in the church, and were to be let out through another door on St. Ursula Street. The bread was to be distributed at the latter door. Although the vestry door was usually locked to prevent boys from reentering to receive more bread, this time the door was left open since the boys were late. Due to this, more men and boys entered without anyone realizing.

Those who had entered began to push the boys queuing in the corridor, who were shoved to the end of the corridor near a half-open door. At this point, a lamp went out leaving the corridor in darkness, and the people inside began to push forward even more. The boys at the front fell down a flight of steps, blocking the door in the process.

Those who were distributing the bread as well as some neighbours rushed to assist the children after they heard screams. They managed to open the doors, and many boys got out and were revived. However, a number of boys had already died due to suffocation or being trampled upon.

The exact number of casualties is not known. Records of the Sacra Infermeria show that 94 bodies of boys aged between 15 and 16 were brought to the hospital on 11 February, and they were buried the following day. However, contemporary sources such as The Gentleman's Magazine and Historical Chronicle, and Nile's Weekly Chronicle record that "no less than 110 boys perished on this occasion".

== Aftermath ==
An investigation led by the lieutenant governor, Richard Plasket, took place after the disaster, and a report about the findings was published a few days after the incident. The investigation concluded that it was an unfortunate accident caused by a succession of errors, and no one was accused for the deaths of the children.
