= Nadur Carnival =

Carnival in Nadur, Gozo

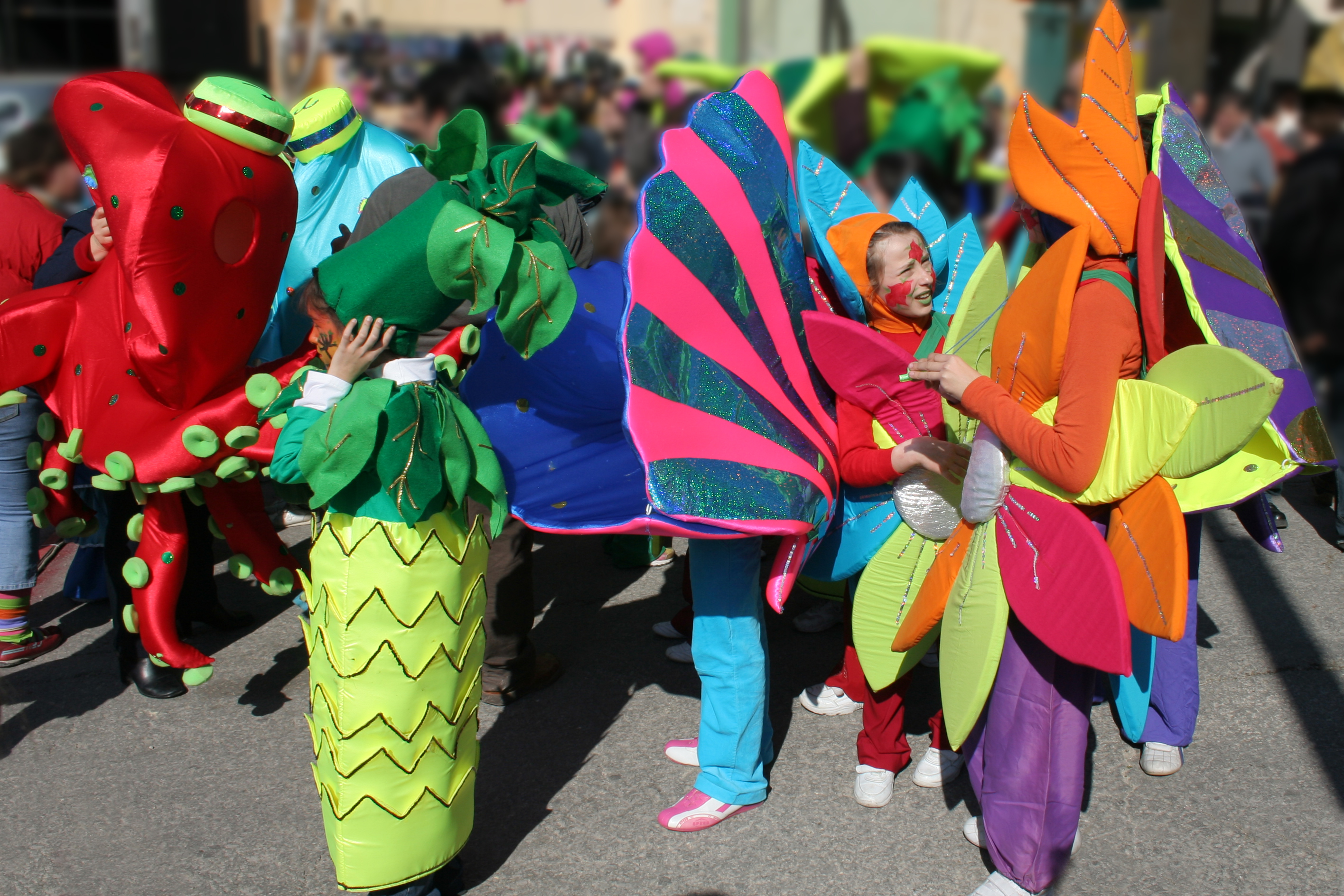
Nadur Carnival, 2006

The Nadur Carnival is unique among the many manifestations of Carnival. It is not organized by any committee and subsequently no rules apply. Sunset invites a multitude of masked and hooded creatures to throng the streets of Nadur - creatures wearing all kinds of funny and grotesque costumes.

Nadur is a small locality with a population of 4500, on the island of Gozo - the sister island of Malta - in the middle of the Mediterranean about 50 km south of Sicily. It is run by a Local Council with 5 elected members: the Mayor, Deputy Mayor and 3 Councilors with one full-time Executive Secretary.

Besides the religious feast of St. Peter & St. Paul, known locally as "L-Imnarja" held on 29 June and which lasts a whole week, Nadur is also famous for its annual revelry held on the 5 days preceding Ash Wednesday, the beginning of Lent.

The creativity of all those taking part and the many visitors have earned it other names such as the Spontaneous Carnival, Grotesque or Macabre Carnival.

In 2005 the Nadur Carnival was the World Carnival Capital by virtue of hosting the largest ever gathering of international Carnival dignitaries and organizers for the global Carnival City summit organized by the Federation of European Carnival Cities
