= 2026–27 Real Madrid Baloncesto season =

Real Madrid
2026–27 season
- President: (Spain) Florentino Pérez
- Head coach: (Spain) Pedro Martínez
- Arena: Movistar Arena
- Liga ACB: 1st
- EuroLeague: 5th
- EuroLeague SuperCup: Winners
- Highest home attendance: Liga ACB: 8,123; Real Madrid 89–87 Unicaja (27 September 2026) EuroLeague: 10,164; Real Madrid 112–115 Panathinaikos (4 November 2026)
- Lowest home attendance: Liga ACB: 6,468; Real Madrid 90–71 UCAM Murcia (8 November 2026) EuroLeague: 6,723; Real Madrid 111–92 ASVEL (15 October 2026)
- Average home attendance: Liga ACB: 6,987; EuroLeague: 8,792
- Biggest win: Real Madrid 120–83 Manresa (11 October 2026)
- Biggest defeat: Anadolu Efes 94–84 Real Madrid (29 September 2026)
Home	Away
- All statistics correct as of 15 November 2026.

The 2026–27 season is Real Madrid's 96th in existence, their 71st consecutive season in the top flight of Spanish basketball and 20th consecutive season in the EuroLeague.

Times up to 25 October 2026 and from 29 March 2027 are CEST (UTC+2). Times from 27 October 2026 to 30 March 2027 are CET (UTC+1).

== Players ==
=== Squad information ===
Note: Flags indicate national team eligibility at FIBA-sanctioned events. Players may hold other non-FIBA nationalities not displayed.

Real Madrid roster
Players
Coaches

Pos.	No.	Nat.	Name	Ht.	Wt.	Age
SG	1	(United States)	Smith Jr., Nick	1.88 m (6 ft 2 in)	84 kg (185 lb)	22 – 18 April 2004
SG	2	(Ukraine)	Shulga, Max	1.97 m (6 ft 6 in)	95 kg (209 lb)	24 – 25 June 2002
G/F	3	(France)	Luwawu-Cabarrot, Timothé	2.00 m (6 ft 7 in)	98 kg (216 lb)	31 – 9 May 1995
PF	4	(Spain)	Pradilla, Jaime	2.05 m (6 ft 9 in)	106 kg (234 lb)	25 – 3 January 2001
G/F	6	(Spain)	Abalde, Alberto	2.02 m (6 ft 8 in)	95 kg (209 lb)	30 – 15 December 1995
PG	7	(Argentina)	Campazzo, Facundo (injured)	1.80 m (5 ft 11 in)	88 kg (194 lb)	35 – 23 March 1991
F	8	(Nigeria)	Okeke, Chuma	2.01 m (6 ft 7 in)	104 kg (229 lb)	28 – 18 August 1998
G/F	9	(Italy)	Procida, Gabriele	2.01 m (6 ft 7 in)	88 kg (194 lb)	24 – 1 June 2002
G	12	(France)	Maledon, Théo (injured)	1.97 m (6 ft 6 in)	79 kg (174 lb)	25 – 12 June 2001
F	14	(Argentina)	Deck, Gabriel (injured)	1.98 m (6 ft 6 in)	105 kg (231 lb)	31 – 8 February 1995
F/C	16	(Spain)	Garuba, Usman (injured)	2.03 m (6 ft 8 in)	115 kg (254 lb)	24 – 9 March 2002
PF	20	(Finland)	Jantunen, Mikael (injured)	2.04 m (6 ft 8 in)	100 kg (220 lb)	26 – 20 April 2000
C	22	(Cape Verde)	Tavares, Edy	2.22 m (7 ft 3 in)	125 kg (276 lb)	34 – 22 March 1992
G	23	(Spain)	Llull, Sergio (C)	1.94 m (6 ft 4 in)	94 kg (207 lb)	39 – 15 November 1987
G	24	(Dominican Republic)	Feliz, Andrés	1.88 m (6 ft 2 in)	92 kg (203 lb)	29 – 15 July 1997
C	30	(United States)	Jones, Damian	2.11 m (6 ft 11 in)	111 kg (245 lb)	31 – 30 June 1995
C	33	(France)	Sarr, Olivier	2.15 m (7 ft 1 in)	109 kg (240 lb)	27 – 20 February 1999
PF	44	(Spain)	Ndiaye, Eli	2.04 m (6 ft 8 in)	95 kg (209 lb)	22 – 26 June 2004

Head coach

- (Spain) Pedro Martínez

Assistant coach(es)

- (Spain) Francisco Redondo
- (Spain) Salva Camps
- (Spain) Isidoro Calín
- (Spain) Piti Hurtado
- (Spain) David Jimeno

Athletic trainer(s)

- (Spain) Juan Trapero

Legend

- (C) Team captain
- (Y) Youth player
- Injured

- Roster
Updated: November 15, 2026

=== Players with multiple nationalities ===
- (Argentina) (Spain) Facundo Campazzo
- (United States) (Nigeria) Chuma Okeke
- (Argentina) (Spain) Gabriel Deck
- (Dominican Republic) (Spain) Andrés Feliz
- (Spain) (Senegal) Eli Ndiaye

=== Depth chart ===
Pos.	Starting 5	Bench 1	Bench 2	Inactive
C	Edy Tavares †	Damian Jones *	Olivier Sarr °	Usman Garuba † (injured)
PF	Jaime Pradilla †	Chuma Okeke ^	Eli Ndiaye †	Mikael Jantunen ° (injured)
SF	Gabriele Procida °	Timothé Luwawu-Cabarrot °		Gabriel Deck † (injured)
SG	Alberto Abalde †	Nick Smith Jr. *	Max Shulga †
PG	Théo Maledon °	Andrés Feliz ^	Sergio Llull †	Facundo Campazzo ° (injured)

Notes: Blue † – Spanish or homegrown player; (Note: A homegrown player is a player that played for at least three years before the age of 20 on a Spanish team. In Liga ACB, the team must register at least four homegrown players in rosters of 10–12 players or at least three homegrown players in rosters of 8–9 players. In EuroLeague, the team did not have any limitations regarding the number of homegrown players.) Red * – overseas player; (Note: An overseas player is a player from outside EEA, FIBA Europe or ACP states. In Liga ACB, the team may register at most two overseas players. In EuroLeague, the team did not have any limitations regarding the number of overseas players.) Purple °; – community player (Note: Comunitarios (loosely translated as "Community players") refers to any player who holds a passport from a country within the European Union (EU), the European Economic Area (EEA), or an associated nation with specific treaties. In Liga ACB, if a European player signs with a Spanish team, they are registered as a Comunitario. Teams can theoretically sign an unlimited number of these players, provided they still satisfy the mandatory homegrown quota (cupos).) Gold ^; – cotonou status player (Note: Cotonou status is a massive roster loophole in European basketball. It allows players from 78 African, Caribbean, and Pacific (ACP) countries to be treated exactly like EU citizens (Comunitarios) for employment purposes. In Liga ACB, a player with a passport from a Cotonou country does not count toward the maximum limit of 2 non-EU imports.) Green ‡ – youth player (Note: In Liga ACB, the team may register under-22 players linked to the youth system. In EuroLeague, the team may register under-20 players linked to the youth system.)

=== Transactions ===
==== In ====
No.	Pos.	Nat.	Name	Age	Moving from		Type	Length	Ends	Transfer fee	Date	Source
1	PG	(United States)	Nick Smith Jr.	22	Los Angeles Lakers	(United States)	Transfer	1 year	June 2027	Free	16 September 2026	
2	SG	(Ukraine)	Max Shulga	24	Boston Celtics	(United States)	Transfer	2 years	July 2028	Free	14 August 2026	
3	G/F	(France)	Timothé Luwawu-Cabarrot	31	Baskonia	(Spain)	Transfer	2 years	June 2028	Undisclosed	17 July 2026	
4	PF	(Spain)	Jaime Pradilla	25	Valencia Basket	(Spain)	Transfer	5 years	June 2031	Free	7 July 2026	
20	PF	(Finland)	Mikael Jantunen	26	Fenerbahçe	(Turkey)	Transfer	2 years	June 2028	Free	17 July 2026	
30	C	(United States)	Damian Jones	31	Vaqueros de Bayamón	(Puerto Rico)	Transfer	1 year	June 2027	Free	28 August 2026	
33	C	(France)	Olivier Sarr	27	Cleveland Cavaliers	(United States)	Transfer	2 years	June 2028	Free	15 August 2026	
44	F/C	(Spain)	Eli Ndiaye	22	Atlanta Hawks	(United States)	Transfer	2 years	June 2028	Undisclosed	17 August 2026	

==== Out ====
No.	Pos.	Nat.	Name	Age	Moving to		Type	Transfer fee	Date	Source
0	PF	(Canada)	Trey Lyles	31	Minnesota Timberwolves	(United States)	End of contract	Free	11 July 2026	
1	SG	(Germany)	David Krämer	29	Crvena zvezda	(Serbia)	End of contract	Free	15 July 2026	
5	C	(Mali)	Mady Sissoko	25	Beşiktaş	(Turkey)	End of contract	Free	3 July 2026	
11	F	(Croatia)	Mario Hezonja	31	Cleveland Cavaliers	(United States)	Parted ways	Free	31 July 2026	
13	F/C	(Spain)	Izan Almansa	21	Gonzaga Bulldogs	(United States)	Released	Free	20 August 2026	
25	C	(Ukraine)	Alex Len	33	Baskonia	(Spain)	End of contract	Undisclosed	30 June 2025	
77	C	(Turkey)	Ömer Yurtseven	28	Rio Grande Valley Vipers	(United States)	End of contract	Free	26 October 2026	

== Pre-season and friendlies ==
=== Friendly matches ===
29 August 2026	Río Breogán	110–102	Real Madrid	Pontevedra
20:00	Scoring by quarter: 26–22, 25–24, 27–33, 32–23
	Pts: Alonso 20	Boxscore	Pts: Okeke 18	Arena: Municipal de Deportes

5 September 2026 I Memorial Urbano González Escapa	Real Madrid	121–80	Kosner Baskonia	León
20:00	Scoring by quarter: 46–26, 32–13, 28–20, 15–21
	Pts: Campazzo 25	Boxscore	Pts: Spagnolo 19	Arena: Palacio de los Deportes

11 September 2026 Trofeo Costa del Sol	La Laguna Tenerife	90–97	Real Madrid	Marbella
20:00	Scoring by quarter: 25–29, 28–20, 17–25, 20–23
	Pts: Guy 17	Boxscore	Pts: Luwawu-Cabarrot 26	Arena: Pabellón Sergio Scariolo

12 September 2026 Trofeo Costa del Sol	Unicaja	74–113	Real Madrid	Málaga
19:00	Scoring by quarter: 27–25, 9–30, 16–25, 22–33
	Pts: Perry 16	Boxscore	Pts: Maledon 19	Arena: Martín Carpena

== Competitions ==
=== Overview ===
Competition	First match	Last match	Starting round	Final position	Record							
Competition	First match	Last match	Starting round	Final position	Pld	W	D	L	PF	PA	PD	Win %
Liga ACB	27 September 2026		Round 1		8	8		0	842	681	+161	100.00
EuroLeague	24 September 2026		Round 1		11	7		4	1,072	977	+95	63.64
EuroLeague SuperCup	18 September 2026	19 September 2026	Semi-finals	Winners	2	2		0	191	184	+7	100.00
Total					21	17	0	4	2,105	1,842	+263	80.95

Last updated: 15 November 2026
Source: Competitions

=== Liga ACB ===
==== League table ====
Pos	Team	Pld	W	L	PF	PA	PD	Qualification or relegation
1	Real Madrid	8	8	0	842	681	+161	Qualification to playoffs
2	Valencia Basket	8	6	2	805	713	+92	Qualification to playoffs
3	La Laguna Tenerife	8	6	2	697	637	+60	Qualification to playoffs
4	Barça	8	6	2	789	744	+45	Qualification to playoffs
5	Kosner Baskonia	8	5	3	749	688	+61	Qualification to playoffs

Updated to match(es) played on 15 November 2026. Source: ACB
Rules for classification: 1) Win–loss record; 2) Head–to–head record; 3) Head–to–head point difference; 4) Point difference; 5) Points scored; 6) Sum of quotients of points scored (Note: Head–to–head record is used only after all the matches between the teams in question have been played)

==== Results summary ====
Overall						Home					Away				
Pld	W	L	PF	PA	PD	W	L	PF	PA	PD	W	L	PF	PA	PD
8	8	0	842	681	+161	5	0	508	404	+104	3	0	334	277	+57

Last updated: 15 November 2026.
Source: Competitive matches

==== Results by round ====
Round	1	2	3	4	5	6	7	8	9	10	11	12	13	14	15	16	17	18	19	20	21	22	23	24	25	26	27	28	29	30	31	32	33	34
Ground	H	A	H	H	A	H	H	A	H	H	A	A	A	A	A	H	H	A	H	A	H	A	H	H	A	H	A	A	H	H	A	A	H	A
Result	W	W	W	W	W	W	W	W																										
Position	7	3	2	1	1	1	1	1	1																									

Updated to match(es) played on 15 November 2026. Source: Competitive matches
A = Away; H = Home; W = Win; L = Loss; P = Postponed

==== Matches ====
27 September 2026 1	Real Madrid	89–87	Unicaja	Madrid
19:00	Scoring by quarter: 23–22, 23–25, 19–24, 24–16
	Pts: Maledon 17; Rebs: Tavares 11; Asts: Maledon 7 PIR: Maledon 23	Boxscore	Pts: Hernangómez 20; Rebs: Noua 8 Asts: Perry 5 PIR: Hernangómez, Noua 23	Arena: Movistar Arena; Attendance: 8,123; Referees: Antonio Conde, Sergio Manuel, Roberto Lucas

4 October 2026 2	Monbus Obradoiro	107–114(OT)	Real Madrid	Santiago de Compostela
12:30	Scoring by quarter: 22–22, 21–32, 26–21, 30–24, Overtime: 8–15
	Pts: Childress 23; Rebs: Meindl 7 Asts: Agada 5 PIR: Soriano 19	Boxscore	Pts: Maledon, Luwawu-Cabarrot 25; Rebs: Tavares 8 Asts: Maledon 7 PIR: Maledon 38	Arena: Fontes do Sar; Attendance: 5,976; Referees: Alfonso Olivares, Alberto Sánchez Sixto, Igor Esteve

11 October 2026 3	Real Madrid	120–83	Kids&Us Manresa	Madrid
12:00	Scoring by quarter: 34–22, 28–16, 24–18, 34–27
	Pts: Sarr 16; Rebs: Pradilla 9 Asts: Campazzo 8 PIR: Sarr 24	Boxscore	Pts: Minchev 13; Rebs: three players 5 Asts: Benitez 5 PIR: Minchev 12	Arena: Movistar Arena; Attendance: 7,115; Referees: Luis Miguel Castillo, Jorge Martínez, Leandro Nicolás Lezcano

18 October 2026 4	Real Madrid	119–84	Surne Bilbao	Madrid
12:30	Scoring by quarter: 36–13, 26–22, 27–22, 30–27
	Pts: Llull 19; Rebs: Pradilla 9 Asts: Campazzo 14; PIR: Maledon 24	Boxscore	Pts: Darling 13; Rebs: Petrasek 4 Asts: Somogyi 4 PIR: Petrasek 15	Arena: Movistar Arena; Attendance: 6,619; Referees: Carlos Cortés, Juan de Dios Oyón, Roberto Lucas

25 October 2026 5	iLERNA Lleida	86–122	Real Madrid	Lleida
19:00	Scoring by quarter: 21–31, 19–23, 23–27, 23–41
	Pts: Hughes 13; Rebs: Perrin 9 Asts: Paulí 6 PIR: Kuath 13	Boxscore	Pts: Luwawu-Cabarrot 31; Rebs: Tavares 11; Asts: Campazzo 7 PIR: Luwawu-Cabarrot 35	Arena: Espai Fruita Barris Nord; Attendance: 5,699; Referees: Rafael Serrano, Alberto Sánchez Sixto, Javier Ávila

1 November 2026 6	Real Madrid	90–79	Recoletas Salud San Pablo Burgos	Madrid
12:30	Scoring by quarter: 14–17, 25–14, 25–22, 26–26
	Pts: Luwawu-Cabarrot 17; Rebs: Sarr, Pradilla 9 Asts: Llull, Pradilla 3 PIR: Pradilla 23	Boxscore	Pts: Steward 20; Rebs: Doumbouya, Sengfelder 5 Asts: Steward 4 PIR: Steward 24	Arena: Movistar Arena; Attendance: 6,610; Referees: Jordi Aliaga, Francisco Araña, Esperanza Mendoza

8 November 2026 7	Real Madrid	90–71	UCAM Murcia	Madrid
19:00	Scoring by quarter: 22–20, 25–19, 16–16, 27–16
	Pts: Pradilla 15; Rebs: Pradilla 7 Asts: Llull 6 PIR: Pradilla 24	Boxscore	Pts: Ennis 15; Rebs: Sant-Roos 7 Asts: Forrest, Radebaugh 3 PIR: Sant-Roos 21	Arena: Movistar Arena; Attendance: 6,468; Referees: Fernando Calatrava, Alberto Baena, Iyán González

15 November 2026 8	Kosner Baskonia	84–98	Real Madrid	Vitoria-Gasteiz
19:00	Scoring by quarter: 21–24, 18–23, 19–29, 26–22
	Pts: Kamenjaš 15; Rebs: Kamenjaš 8 Asts: Duarte 5 PIR: Kamenjaš 22	Boxscore	Pts: three players 18; Rebs: Tavares, Feliz 5 Asts: Maledon 6 PIR: Maledon 29	Arena: Buesa Arena; Attendance: 9,360; Referees: Óscar Perea, Jorge Martínez, Fabio Fernández

22 November 2026 9	Real Madrid	vs.	Asisa Joventut	Madrid
19:00
				Arena: Movistar Arena

6 December 2026 10	Real Madrid	vs.	MoraBanc Andorra	Madrid
12:30
				Arena: Movistar Arena

8 December 2026 11	Leyma Coruña	vs.	Real Madrid	A Coruña
17:00
				Arena: Coliseum da Coruña

12 December 2026 12	Río Breogán	vs.	Real Madrid	Lugo
21:00
				Arena: Pazo dos Deportes

20 December 2026 13	Casademont Zaragoza	vs.	Real Madrid	Zaragoza
19:00
				Arena: Pabellón Príncipe Felipe

27 December 2026 14	Barça	vs.	Real Madrid	Barcelona
21:00
				Arena: Palau Blaugrana

2 January 2027 16	Real Madrid	vs.	La Laguna Tenerife	Madrid
20:00
				Arena: Movistar Arena

4 January 2027 15	Valencia Basket	vs.	Real Madrid	Valencia
20:00
				Arena: Roig Arena

10 January 2027 17	Real Madrid	vs.	FIATC Girona	Madrid
12:00
				Arena: Movistar Arena

16 January 2027 18	Recoletas Salud San Pablo Burgos	vs.	Real Madrid	Burgos
19:30
				Arena: Coliseum Burgos

24 January 2027 19	Real Madrid	vs.	Leyma Coruña	Madrid
12:00
				Arena: Movistar Arena

31 January 2027 20	UCAM Murcia	vs.	Real Madrid	Murcia
19:00
				Arena: Palacio de Deportes

7 February 2027 21	Real Madrid	vs.	Kosner Baskonia	Madrid
19:00
				Arena: Movistar Arena

14 February 2027 22	Kids&Us Manresa	vs.	Real Madrid	Manresa
19:00
				Arena: Nou Congost

7 March 2027 23	Real Madrid	vs.	Monbus Obradoiro	Madrid
18:00
				Arena: Movistar Arena

14 March 2027 24	Real Madrid	vs.	Valencia Basket	Madrid
19:00
				Arena: Movistar Arena

21 March 2027 25	FIATC Girona	vs.	Real Madrid	Girona
19:00
				Arena: Fontajau

28 March 2027 26	Real Madrid	vs.	Barça	Madrid
19:00
				Arena: Movistar Arena

4 April 2027 27	Asisa Joventut	vs.	Real Madrid	Badalona
17:00
				Arena: Palau Municipal d'Esports

11 April 2027 28	La Laguna Tenerife	vs.	Real Madrid	San Cristóbal de La Laguna
19:00
				Arena: Santiago Martín

18 April 2027 29	Real Madrid	vs.	Río Breogán	Madrid
12:30
				Arena: Movistar Arena

25 April 2027 30	Real Madrid	vs.	iLERNA Lleida	Madrid
12:30
				Arena: Movistar Arena

2 May 2027 31	Surne Bilbao	vs.	Real Madrid	Bilbao
19:00
				Arena: Bilbao Arena

9 May 2027 32	Unicaja	vs.	Real Madrid	Málaga
19:00
				Arena: Martín Carpena

16 May 2027 33	Real Madrid	vs.	Casademont Zaragoza	Madrid
12:30
				Arena: Movistar Arena

21 May 2027 34	MoraBanc Andorra	vs.	Real Madrid	Andorra la Vella
--:--
				Arena: Pavelló Toni Martí

=== EuroLeague ===
==== League table ====
Pos	Team	Pld	W	L	PF	PA	PD	Qualification
7	(Spanish Basketball Federation) Barcelona	13	8	5	1149	1122	+27	Qualification to play-in
8	(Lithuanian Basketball Federation) Žalgiris	13	8	5	1115	1094	+21	Qualification to play-in
9	(Spanish Basketball Federation) Real Madrid	13	7	6	1227	1152	+75	Qualification to play-in
10	(Israeli Basketball Association) Hapoel IBI Tel Aviv	13	7	6	1175	1138	+37	Qualification to play-in
11	(Basketball Federation of Serbia) Partizan Mozzart Bet	13	7	6	1005	1001	+4	

Updated to match(es) played on 20 November 2026. Source: EuroLeague
Rules for classification: Regular season tiebreakers

==== Results summary ====
Overall						Home					Away				
Pld	W	L	PF	PA	PD	W	L	PF	PA	PD	W	L	PF	PA	PD
11	7	4	1072	977	+95	4	1	498	429	+69	3	3	574	548	+26

Last updated: 12 November 2026.
Source: Competitive matches

==== Results by round ====
Round	1	2	3	4	5	6	7	8	9	10	11	12	13	14	15	16	17	18	19	20	21	22	23	24	25	26	27	28	29	30	31	32	33	34	35	36	37	38
Ground	A	A	A	H	A	H	A	A	H	H	H	A	A	H	H	A	H	H	A	H	H	A	H	H	A	A	H	A	A	H	H	H	A	H	A	H	A	A
Result	L	L	L	W	W	W	W	W	W	L	W																											
Position	11	15	19	14	11	9	7	6	4	8	5																											

Updated to match(es) played on 12 November 2026. Source: Competitive matches
A = Away; H = Home; W = Win; L = Loss; P = Postponed

==== Matches ====
24 September 2026 1	Dubai Basketball (United Arab Emirates Basketball Association)	78–77	(Spanish Basketball Federation) Real Madrid	Dubai
18:00	Scoring by quarter: 20–16, 18–28, 25–18, 15–15
	Pts: Bacon 24; Rebs: Shengelia 8 Asts: Okobo, Bacon 4 PIR: Bacon 31	Boxscore	Pts: Maledon, Luwawu-Cabarrot 11; Rebs: Feliz, Jones 5 Asts: Maledon 6 PIR: Maledon 16	Arena: Coca-Cola Arena; Attendance: 7,269; Referees: Borys Ryzhyk, Kristaps Konstantinovs, Rain Peerandi

29 September 2026 2	Anadolu Efes (Turkish Basketball Federation)	94–84	(Spanish Basketball Federation) Real Madrid	Istanbul
19:00	Scoring by quarter: 27–29, 26–12, 19–24, 22–19
	Pts: Dozier 18; Rebs: Loyd, Fernando 4 Asts: three players 4 PIR: Dozier 18	Boxscore	Pts: Campazzo 16; Rebs: Tavares 7 Asts: Maledon, Feliz 5 PIR: Campazzo 16	Arena: Turkcell Basketball Development Center; Attendance: 8,087; Referees: Milan Nedović, Saulius Račys, Vasiliki Tsaroucha

1 October 2026 3	Hapoel IBI Tel Aviv (Israeli Basketball Association)	102–98	(Spanish Basketball Federation) Real Madrid	Sofia (Note: Since 2025, Hapoel IBI Tel Aviv play their home matches in Bulgaria due to the inability to host matches in Israel as a result of the Gaza war until further notice.)
18:00	Scoring by quarter: 29–20, 34–23, 12–32, 27–23
	Pts: Micić, Bryant 22; Rebs: Bryant 13; Asts: Bryant 7 PIR: Bryant 40	Boxscore	Pts: Maledon 26; Rebs: Tavares 13; Asts: Maledon, Campazzo 7 PIR: Maledon 40	Arena: Arena 8888 Sofia; Attendance: N/A; Referees: Saša Pukl, Sašo Petek, Guido Giovannetti

8 October 2026 4	Real Madrid (Spanish Basketball Federation)	86–76	(Basketball Federation of Serbia) Partizan Mozzart Bet	Madrid
20:45	Scoring by quarter: 27–19, 26–18, 18–20, 15–19
	Pts: Maledon 13; Rebs: Tavares 8 Asts: Maledon 4 PIR: Tavares 14	Boxscore	Pts: Jones 19; Rebs: Thompson 8 Asts: Jones, Pajola 5 PIR: Jones 27	Arena: Movistar Arena; Attendance: 8,579; Referees: Emin Moğulkoç, Miloš Koljenšić, Marcin Kowalski

13 October 2026 5	Armani Olimpia Milan (Italian Basketball Federation)	89–98	(Spanish Basketball Federation) Real Madrid	Assago
20:30	Scoring by quarter: 25–21, 15–32, 27–31, 22–14
	Pts: Bolmaro 21; Rebs: Booker 6 Asts: Bolmaro 5 PIR: Hall, Bolmaro 16	Boxscore	Pts: Maledon 16; Rebs: Tavares 6 Asts: Campazzo 6 PIR: Feliz 24	Arena: Unipol Forum; Attendance: 6,604; Referees: Ilija Belošević, Tomasz Trawicki, Hugues Thépénier

15 October 2026 6	Real Madrid (Spanish Basketball Federation)	111–92	(French Federation of Basketball) LDLC ASVEL	Madrid
21:00	Scoring by quarter: 27–25, 34–23, 16–23, 34–21
	Pts: Feliz 26; Rebs: three players 5 Asts: Maledon 9 PIR: Feliz 30	Boxscore	Pts: Washington 17; Rebs: Bolomboy 7 Asts: Washington, Jackson 6 PIR: Washington 24	Arena: Movistar Arena; Attendance: 6,723; Referees: Milivoje Jovčić, Seffi Shemmesh, Eduard Udyanskyy

22 October 2026 7	Maccabi Rapyd Tel Aviv (Israeli Basketball Association)	99–113	(Spanish Basketball Federation) Real Madrid	Belgrade (Note: Since 24 October 2023, Maccabi Rapyd Tel Aviv play their home matches in Belgrade due to the inability to host matches in Israel as a result of the Gaza war until further notice.)
20:05	Scoring by quarter: 30–23, 22–28, 21–30, 26–32
	Pts: Clark 20; Rebs: Theis 6 Asts: Madar 5 PIR: Colson 22	Boxscore	Pts: Campazzo 21; Rebs: Tavares 7 Asts: Campazzo 5 PIR: Campazzo 28	Arena: Aleksandar Nikolić Hall; Attendance: 102; Referees: Milan Nedović, Saulius Račys, Rain Peerandi

27 October 2026 8	Kosner Baskonia (Spanish Basketball Federation)	86–104	(Spanish Basketball Federation) Real Madrid	Vitoria-Gasteiz
21:00	Scoring by quarter: 19–30, 27–26, 23–26, 17–22
	Pts: Simmons, Lawson 17; Rebs: Faried 9 Asts: Baugh 8 PIR: Lawson 21	Boxscore	Pts: Maledon 19; Rebs: Tavares 12; Asts: Maledon 6 PIR: Tavares 22	Arena: Buesa Arena; Attendance: 8,136; Referees: Mehdi Difallah, Luka Kardum, Michele Rossi

29 October 2026 9	Real Madrid (Spanish Basketball Federation)	95–76	(Turkish Basketball Federation) Fenerbahçe Tarfin	Madrid
20:45	Scoring by quarter: 22–24, 25–18, 23–13, 25–21
	Pts: Maledon 26; Rebs: Okeke, Maledon 7 Asts: Campazzo 10; PIR: Maledon 35	Boxscore	Pts: Clyburn 21; Rebs: Shields 9 Asts: Key, Baldwin 3 PIR: Clyburn 16	Arena: Movistar Arena; Attendance: 9,826; Referees: Borys Ryzhyk, Gytis Vilius, Stefan Ćalić

4 November 2026 10	Real Madrid (Spanish Basketball Federation)	112–115(OT)	(Hellenic Basketball Federation) Panathinaikos AKTOR	Madrid
20:45	Scoring by quarter: 18–24, 30–27, 25–23, 28–27, Overtime: 11–14
	Pts: Feliz 27; Rebs: Tavares 6 Asts: Feliz 6 PIR: Feliz 28	Boxscore	Pts: Nunn 33; Rebs: Lessort 9 Asts: Lessort, Badio 5 PIR: Nunn 31	Arena: Movistar Arena; Attendance: 10,164; Referees: Ilija Belošević, Emin Moğulkoç, Thomas Bissuel

12 November 2026 11	Real Madrid (Spanish Basketball Federation)	105–84	(Basketball Federation of Serbia) Crvena zvezda Meridianbet	Madrid
21:00	Scoring by quarter: 38–20, 18–21, 26–18, 23–25
	Pts: Luwawu-Cabarrot 22; Rebs: Pradilla 8 Asts: Feliz 7 PIR: Luwawu-Cabarrot 24	Boxscore	Pts: Carter 18; Rebs: Moneke 5 Asts: five players 3 PIR: Nwora 18	Arena: Movistar Arena; Attendance: 8,670; Referees: Robert Lottermoser, Kristaps Konstantinovs, Rain Peerandi

18 November 2026 12	Beşiktaş (Turkish Basketball Federation)	vs.	(Spanish Basketball Federation) Real Madrid	Istanbul
18:00
		Boxscore		Arena: Turkcell Basketball Development Center

20 November 2026 13	Olympiacos (Hellenic Basketball Federation)	vs.	(Spanish Basketball Federation) Real Madrid	Ano Liosia (Note: Until the end of 2026, Olympiacos play their home matches at the SUNEL Arena in Ano Liosia due to renovation works on their regular venue, the Peace and Friendship Stadium in Piraeus.)
20:15
		Boxscore		Arena: SUNEL Arena

25 November 2026 14	Real Madrid (Spanish Basketball Federation)	vs.	(Lithuanian Basketball Federation) Žalgiris	Madrid
20:45
		Boxscore		Arena: Movistar Arena

3 December 2026 15	Real Madrid (Spanish Basketball Federation)	vs.	(Spanish Basketball Federation) Barcelona	Madrid
20:45
		Boxscore		Arena: Movistar Arena

10 December 2026 16	Paris Basketball (French Federation of Basketball)	vs.	(Spanish Basketball Federation) Real Madrid	Paris
20:45
		Boxscore		Arena: Adidas Arena

15 December 2026 17	Real Madrid (Spanish Basketball Federation)	vs.	(German Basketball Federation) Bayern Munich	Madrid
20:45
		Boxscore		Arena: Movistar Arena

17 December 2026 18	Real Madrid (Spanish Basketball Federation)	vs.	(Spanish Basketball Federation) Valencia Basket	Madrid
20:45
		Boxscore		Arena: Movistar Arena

22 December 2026 19	Virtus Bologna (Italian Basketball Federation)	vs.	(Spanish Basketball Federation) Real Madrid	Bologna
20:30
		Boxscore		Arena: Unipol Hall

29 December 2026 20	Real Madrid (Spanish Basketball Federation)	vs.	(United Arab Emirates Basketball Association) Dubai Basketball	Madrid
21:00
		Boxscore		Arena: Movistar Arena

7 January 2027 21	Real Madrid (Spanish Basketball Federation)	vs.	(Hellenic Basketball Federation) Olympiacos	Madrid
20:45
		Boxscore		Arena: Movistar Arena

12 January 2027 22	Crvena zvezda Meridianbet (Basketball Federation of Serbia)	vs.	(Spanish Basketball Federation) Real Madrid	Belgrade
20:00
		Boxscore		Arena: Belgrade Arena

14 January 2027 23	Real Madrid (Spanish Basketball Federation)	vs.	(Turkish Basketball Federation) Anadolu Efes	Madrid
20:45
		Boxscore		Arena: Movistar Arena

21 January 2027 24	Real Madrid (Spanish Basketball Federation)	vs.	(Israeli Basketball Association) Maccabi Rapyd Tel Aviv	Madrid
20:45
		Boxscore		Arena: Movistar Arena

29 January 2027 25	Fenerbahçe Tarfin (Turkish Basketball Federation)	vs.	(Spanish Basketball Federation) Real Madrid	Istanbul
18:45
		Boxscore		Arena: Ülker Sports and Event Hall

2 February 2027 26	Partizan Mozzart Bet (Basketball Federation of Serbia)	vs.	(Spanish Basketball Federation) Real Madrid	Belgrade
20:45
		Boxscore		Arena: Belgrade Arena

4 February 2027 27	Real Madrid (Spanish Basketball Federation)	vs.	(French Federation of Basketball) Paris Basketball	Madrid
2:45
		Boxscore		Arena: Movistar Arena

12 February 2027 28	Žalgiris (Lithuanian Basketball Federation)	vs.	(Spanish Basketball Federation) Real Madrid	Kaunas
19:00
		Boxscore		Arena: Žalgirio Arena

5 March 2027 29	Barcelona (Spanish Basketball Federation)	vs.	(Spanish Basketball Federation) Real Madrid	Barcelona
20:30
		Boxscore		Arena: Palau Blaugrana

9 March 2027 30	Real Madrid (Spanish Basketball Federation)	vs.	(Israeli Basketball Association) Hapoel IBI Tel Aviv	Madrid
20:45
		Boxscore		Arena: Movistar Arena

11 March 2027 31	Real Madrid (Spanish Basketball Federation)	vs.	(Italian Basketball Federation) Virtus Bologna	Madrid
20:45
		Boxscore		Arena: Movistar Arena

18 March 2027 32	Real Madrid (Spanish Basketball Federation)	vs.	(Spanish Basketball Federation) Kosner Baskonia	Madrid
20:45
		Boxscore		Arena: Movistar Arena

24 March 2027 33	Bayern Munich (German Basketball Federation)	vs.	(Spanish Basketball Federation) Real Madrid	Munich
20:00
		Boxscore		Arena: SAP Garden

26 March 2027 34	Real Madrid (Spanish Basketball Federation)	vs.	(Turkish Basketball Federation) Beşiktaş	Madrid
20:45
		Boxscore		Arena: Movistar Arena

1 April 2027 35	Valencia Basket (Spanish Basketball Federation)	vs.	(Spanish Basketball Federation) Real Madrid	Valencia
20:30
		Boxscore		Arena: Roig Arena

6 April 2027 36	Real Madrid (Spanish Basketball Federation)	vs.	(Italian Basketball Federation) Armani Olimpia Milan	Madrid
20:45
		Boxscore		Arena: Movistar Arena

8 April 2027 37	LDLC ASVEL (French Federation of Basketball)	vs.	(Spanish Basketball Federation) Real Madrid	Décines-Charpieu
20:00
		Boxscore		Arena: LDLC Arena

15 April 2027 38	Panathinaikos AKTOR (Hellenic Basketball Federation)	vs.	(Spanish Basketball Federation) Real Madrid	Marousi
20:15
		Boxscore		Arena: Telekom Center Athens

=== EuroLeague SuperCup ===
18 September 2026 Semifinal	Dubai Basketball (United Arab Emirates)	95–98(OT)	(Spain) Real Madrid	Abu Dhabi
19:00	Scoring by quarter: 27–18, 16–24, 20–22, 25–24, Overtime: 7–10
	Pts: Okobo 24; Rebs: Shengelia 5 Asts: Bacon 4 PIR: Bacon 21	Boxscore	Pts: Tavares, Luwawu-Cabarrot 20; Rebs: Tavares, Pradilla 7 Asts: Luwawu-Cabarrot 6 PIR: Tavares 22	Arena: Etihad Arena; Attendance: N/A; Referees: Ilija Belošević, Emin Moğulkoç, Gytis Vilius

19 September 2026 Final	Olympiacos (Greece)	89–93	(Spain) Real Madrid	Abu Dhabi
19:00	Scoring by quarter: 15–24, 28–23, 29–28, 17–18
	Pts: Vezenkov 22; Rebs: Vezenkov 5 Asts: Miller-McIntyre 9 PIR: Vezenkov 25	Boxscore	Pts: Luwawu-Cabarrot 12; Rebs: Deck, Tavares 7 Asts: Campazzo 9 PIR: Campazzo 17	Arena: Etihad Arena; Attendance: N/A; Referees: Ilija Belošević, Emin Moğulkoç, Luka Kardum

== Statistics ==
=== Liga ACB ===
Player	GP	GS	MPG	2FG%	3FG%	FT%	RPG	APG	SPG	BPG	PPG	PIR
Nick Smith Jr.												
Max Shulga												
Timothé Luwawu-Cabarrot												
Jaime Pradilla												
Alberto Abalde												
Facundo Campazzo												
Chuma Okeke												
Gabriele Procida												
Théo Maledon												
Gabriel Deck												
Pablo Mera												
Usman Garuba												
Mikael Jantunen												
Edy Tavares												
Sergio Llull												
Andrés Feliz												
Damian Jones												
Olivier Sarr												
Eli Ndiaye												
TOTAL												

=== EuroLeague ===
Player	GP	GS	MPG	2FG%	3FG%	FT%	RPG	APG	SPG	BPG	PPG	PIR
Nick Smith Jr.												
Max Shulga												
Timothé Luwawu-Cabarrot												
Jaime Pradilla												
Alberto Abalde												
Facundo Campazzo												
Chuma Okeke												
Gabriele Procida												
Théo Maledon												
Gabriel Deck												
Pablo Mera												
Usman Garuba												
Mikael Jantunen												
Edy Tavares												
Sergio Llull												
Andrés Feliz												
Damian Jones												
Olivier Sarr												
Eli Ndiaye												
TOTAL												
