= Abdi İpekçi Arena =

Indoor arena in Istanbul, Turkey

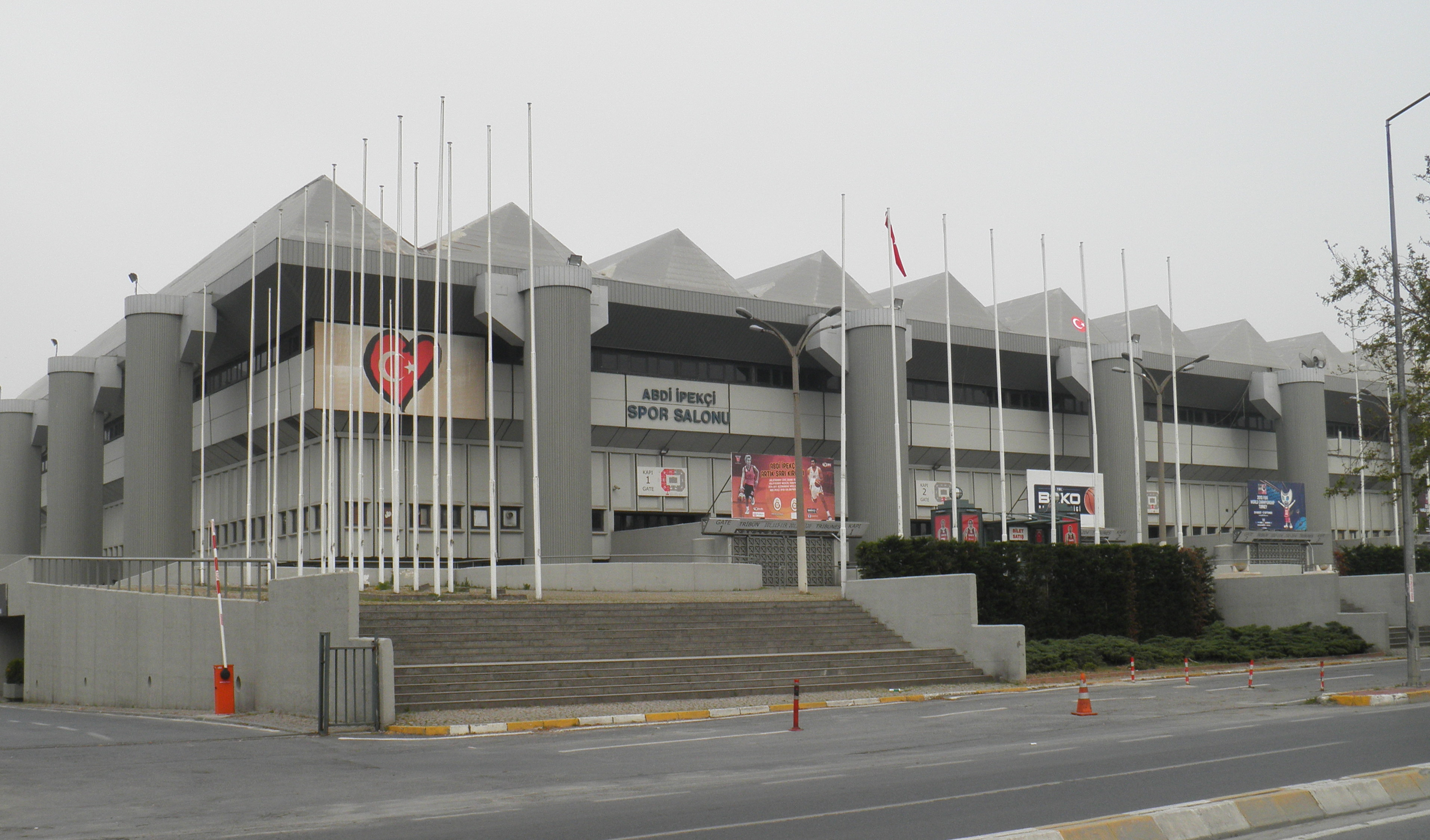
- Abdi İpekçi Arena's exterior (2012)
- Interactive map of Abdi İpekçi Arena
- Former names: Abdi İpekçi Sports Complex; Abdi İpekçi Sports Hall
- Location: 10. Yıl Caddesi, Kazlıçeşme, Zeytinburnu, Istanbul
- Coordinates: 40°59′49″N 28°55′10″E
- Owner: TBF
- Capacity: Basketball: 12,270

Construction
- Groundbreaking: 1979
- Opened: 3 June 1989
- Closed: 2017
- Demolished: 2018
- Architects: Ragıp Buluç; Ziya Tanalı; Ercan Yener

Tenants
- Anadolu Efes; Galatasaray Odeabank; Galatasaray Istanbul

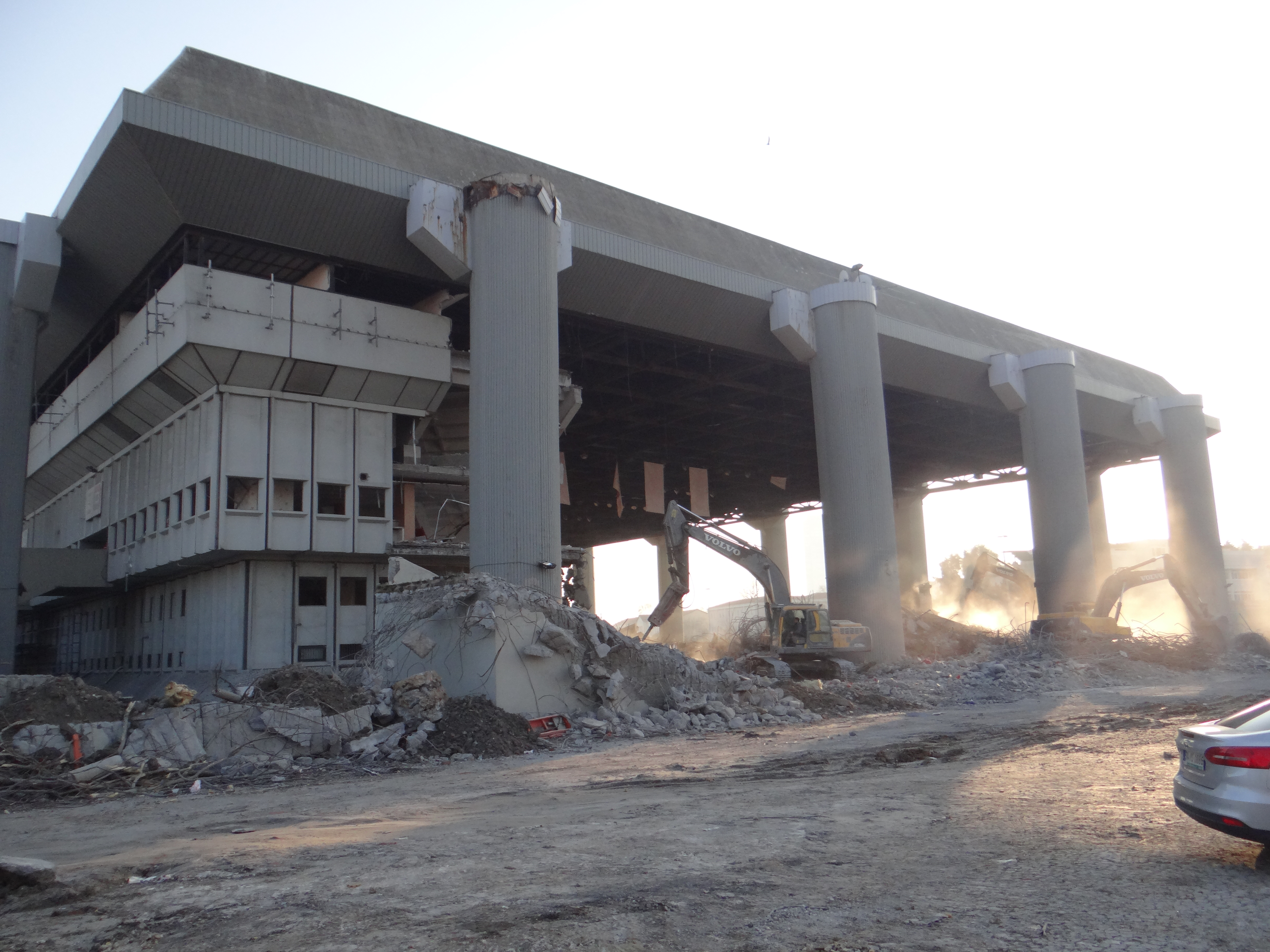
Demolition of the arena, February 2018

Abdi İpekçi Arena, formerly known as Abdi İpekçi Sports Complex, was a multi-purpose indoor arena located in the Zeytinburnu district of Istanbul, Turkey, situated just outside the ancient city walls, in Yedikule.

== History ==
Designed in 1979, and opened on 3 June 1989, after several years of interrupted construction, it was named after the renowned Turkish journalist Abdi İpekçi. It was the primary basketball venue in Istanbul for two decades and hosted many (mostly the international) games of Istanbul's four top basketball clubs Anandolu Efes, Fenerbahçe, Galatasaray and Besiktas, as well as many other sports events and concerts. However, its significance declined after the opening of Sinan Erdem Dome in 2010, which surpassed Abdi İpekçi Arena as the biggest and most state of the art arena in Istanbul.

=== Closure ===
After the 2016/2017 season, the arena was closed. It got demolished in early 2018. In its place, a basketball training and performance center was built. Basketball teams Anadolu Efes and Galatasaray played their games at Sinan Erdem Dome beginning with the 2017/18 season, after which both returned to the newly built Basketball Development Center in 2024. Galatasaray also plans to move into a newly built own arena in the coming years. Fenerbahçe already moved into their own Ülker Sports Arena in 2012.

== Facilities ==
The arena had an audience seating capacity of 12,270. It hosted national and international sports events, such as basketball, volleyball, wrestling, and weightlifting, as well as concerts and congresses, among other events. The facility contained a multi-faced visual scoreboard, six online-system counters, four locker rooms, two internet rooms, a press room, two multi-purpose offices, VIP rooms, etc. Its parking lot had a capacity of 1,500 cars.

== Events ==
The professional basketball teams of Galatasaray men's basketball team and Galatasaray women's basketball team played their Turkish League home matches since the 2009–10 season in the Abdi İpekçi Arena.

Some of the notable events, which took place in the arena are:

- 1992 FIBA European League Final Four
- 1995 FIBA European Cup Final
- 1996 FIBA EuroStars
- 1997 Girl Power! Live in Istanbul
- 2001 Depeche Mode concert Exciter Tour
- EuroBasket 2001 Final phase
- 2004 Eurovision Song Contest
- 2005 Phil Collins Concert
- 2007 Enrique Iglesias Concert
- 2009 European Short Course Swimming Championships
- 2009 Men's European Volleyball Championship
- 2010 FIBA World Championship
- 2011 European Judo Championships
- 2012 EuroLeague Women Final Eight
- 2014 FIBA World Championship for Women

== See also ==
- Basketball Development Center
- List of Brutalist structures

Preceded by Palais omnisports de Paris-Bercy; Paris	FIBA European Champions Cup; Final Four; Venue; 1992	Succeeded by Peace and Friendship Stadium; Athens
Preceded by CIG de Malley; Lausanne	European Cup; Final Venue; 1995	Succeeded by Araba Arena; Vitoria
Preceded by First Venue	FIBA Euro All star game Venue; 1996	Succeeded by Yad Eliyahu Sports Palace; Tel Aviv
Preceded by Palais omnisports de Paris-Bercy; Paris	FIBA EuroBasket; Final Venue; 2001	Succeeded by Stockholm Globe Arena; Stockholm
Preceded by Skonto Hall; Riga	Eurovision Song Contest; Venue; 2004	Succeeded by Palace of Sports; Kyiv
