= Pege =

Town of ancient Thrace

Coordinates: 41°00′00″N 28°54′57″E

Pege was a town of ancient Thrace, inhabited during Byzantine times.

Its site is located near Balıklı in European Turkey.
