= Balıklı Greek Hospital =

Balıklı Greek Hospital Ελληνικό Νοσοκομείο του Βαλουκλή Balıklı Rum Hastanesi
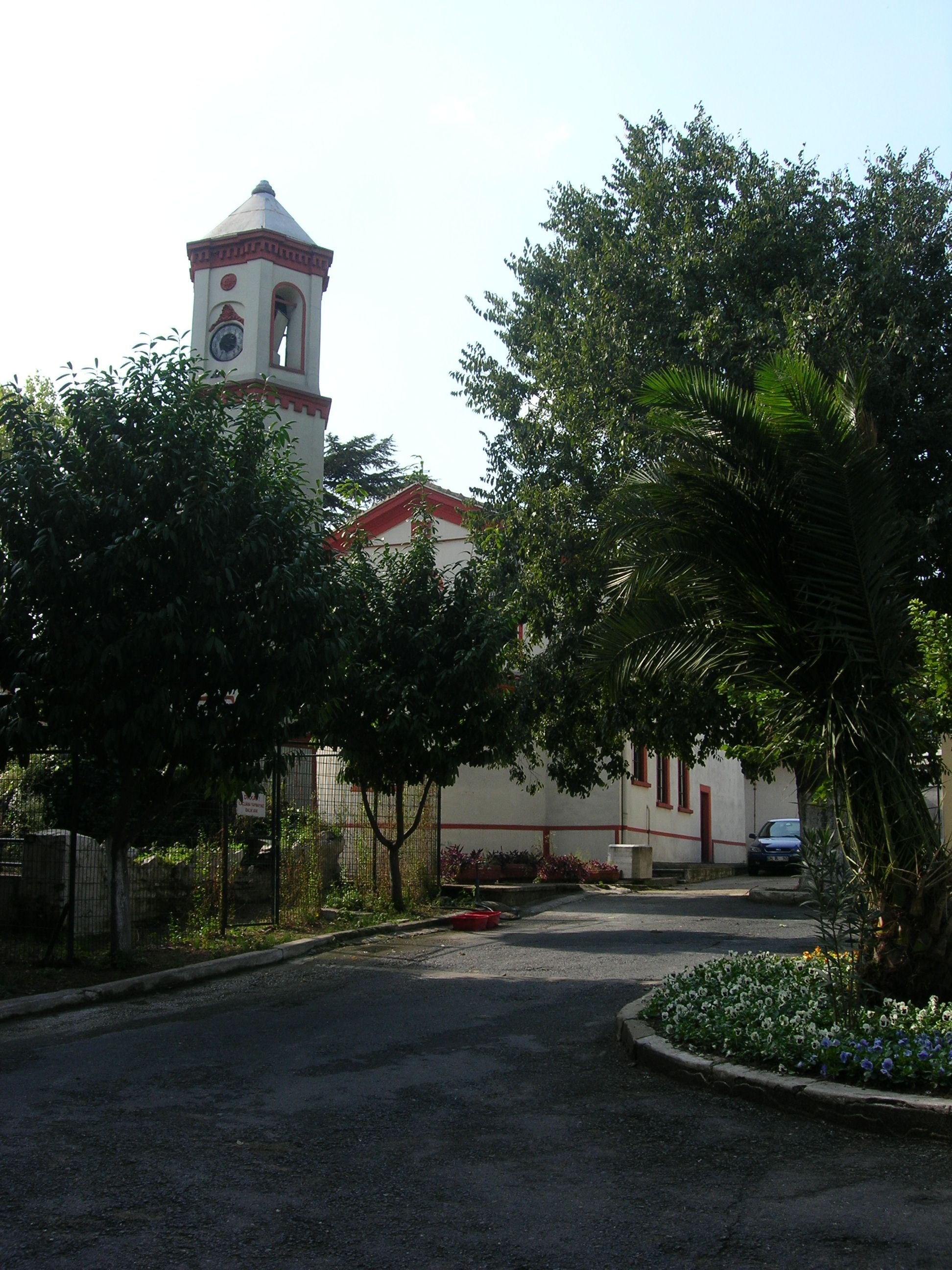
- Entrance of Hospital and view of Church

Geography
- Location: Yedikule, Zeytinburnu, Istanbul, Turkey
- Coordinates: 40°59′59″N 28°55′05″E

Organisation
- Type: District General
- Patron: Dimitri Karayani (Dimitrios Karagiannis)

Services
- Beds: 650

History
- Opened: 1753

Links
- Website: www.baliklirum.com
- Lists: Hospitals in Turkey

The Balıklı Greek Hospital (Greek: Ελληνικό Νοσοκομείο του Βαλουκλή, Turkish: Balıklı Rum Hastanesi) is a health care institution at the Balıklı neighborhood of the Kazlıçeşme quarter in Zeytinburnu district of Istanbul, which was established in 1753 and continues its service run by the Greek community of Turkey.

It remains among the three historic hospitals established by Istanbul's Greek community, alongside institutions in Galata and Beyoglu.

== History ==
The Balıklı Greek Hospital was originally established as the Yedikule Hospital through the Ottoman government edict in 1753. The hospital was built and sponsored by the Union of Greek Grocers. The immediate objective of the hospital was to help cure epidemics and common diseases specifically affecting the ethnic Greek population of Constantinople. The hospital, however, was subjected to a fire in 1790, which completely destroyed the structure. The hospital was rebuilt in 1893 under the sponsorship of Patriarch Neophytus VIII (reigned 1891 - 1894).

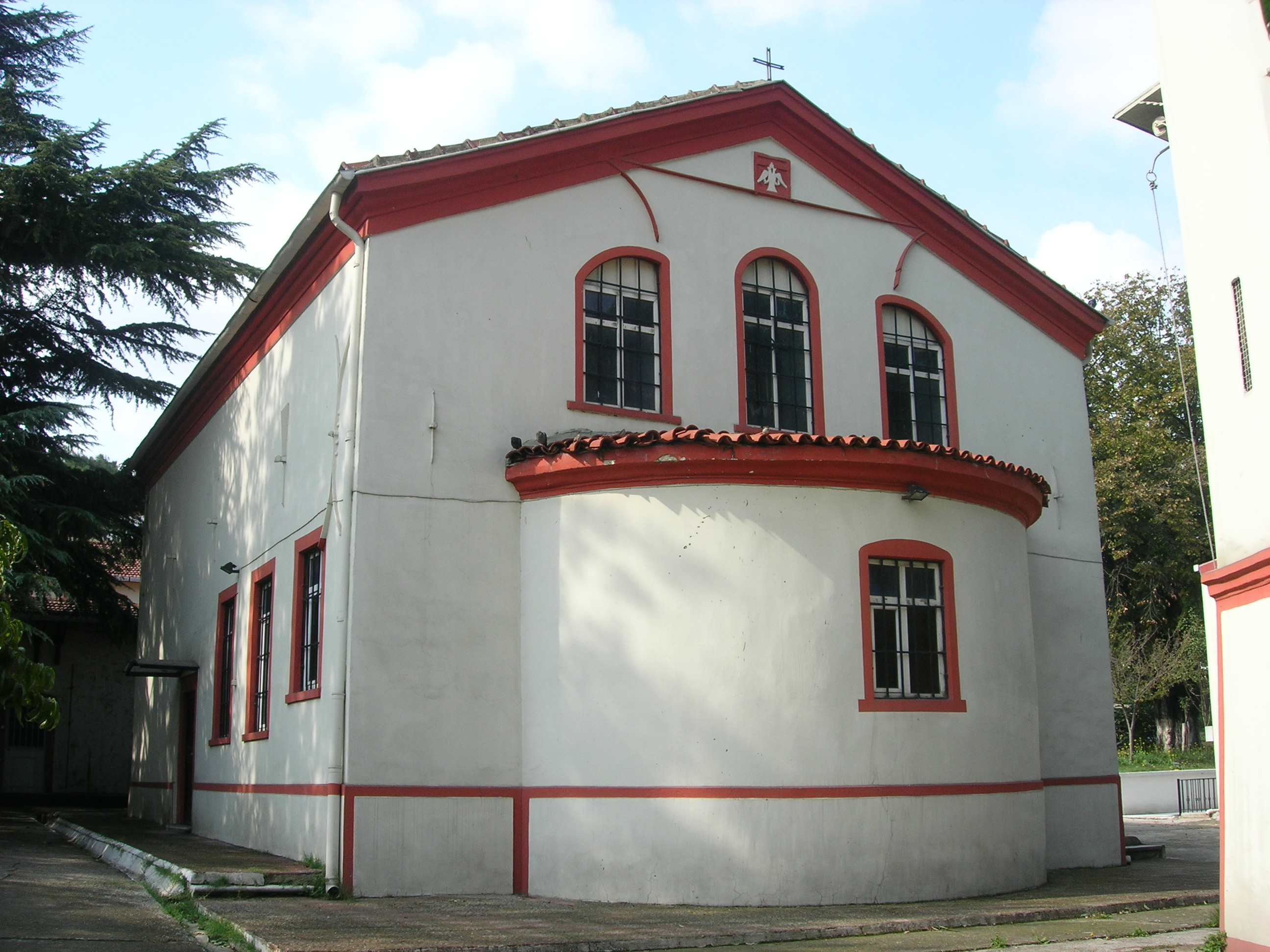
Church on the premises of the hospital

By the end of the 18th century, the Greek community of Constantinople had built three hospitals: this one, in 1762, another in the district of Galata, and in 1780 a third in Pera. All three hospitals had their own particular constitutions, but they were all placed under the supervision of the Ecumenical Patriarch, who was responsible for nominating the administrative boards of the hospitals. In 1852, through the sponsorship of Patriarch Germanus IV, the Balıklı hospital established an orphanage on the premises. The hospital's records reveal that the community's hospitals were open to all patients regardless of ethnic origin and religious beliefs. The hospital also features a church, which serves not only for patients but the Greek Orthodox community at large.

During the Istanbul riots of 1955, the hospital received many patients who suffered from trauma, rape, and physical abuse. The hospital was restored in 1991, and in 1994, the first private clinic for the treatment of alcohol and substance abuse in Turkey was established.

In late 1960, the Turkish treasure seized the properties of the Balıklı Greek Hospital. The hospital sued the treasury on the grounds that the transfer of its property was illegal, but the Turkish courts were in favor of the Turkish treasury. In August 2002, a new law was passed by the Turkish parliament to protect the minorities' rights, because of Turkey's EU candidacy. This new law prevented the Turkish treasury from seizing community foundation properties.

== Today ==
Today, Balıklı Greek Hospital continues to cater to the public in Istanbul. In 2011, the hospital had 39 doctors, 98 nurses, and other assistants and personnel, which accounted for 440 employees in total. On August 4, 2022, a fire broke out on the roof of the hospital. The roof was completely destroyed, and the upper floor was also destroyed except, for the exterior walls. However, the ground floor of the hospital remained unscathed from the fire.

In April 2026, the site was restored and reopened. The work was carried out in coordination with the Istanbul Governor's Office, Zeytinburnu Municipality, and the Balıklı Greek Foundation.
