= Balıklı, Istanbul =

Quarter of Istanbul, Turkey

Coordinates: 41°00′23″N 28°54′57″E

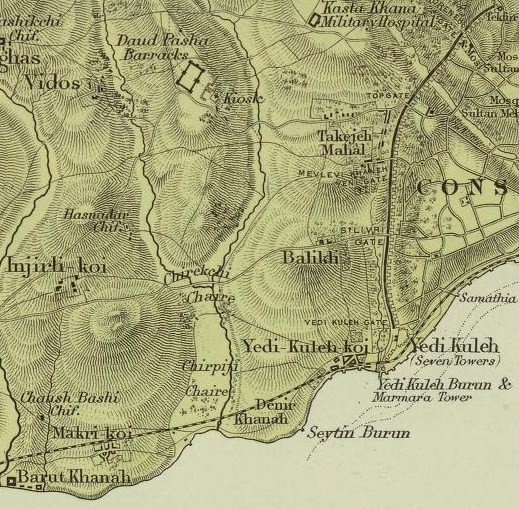
Old map of Zeytinburnu representing Balikli

Balıklı (Greek: Μπαλουκλί, pr. "Baluklí") is a quarter of Istanbul, Turkey. It belongs to the Zeytinburnu district, and is part of the Kazlıçeşme neighborhood. It is located along the Marmara Sea, and borders Istanbul's walled city on the east, between the gates of Yedikule and Silivri. Before the rapid increase of Istanbul's population in the 1970s, Balıklı was a rural quarter. The name of the quarter (balikli in Turkish means "with fish", "place where there are fishes") comes from the fishes present in the fountain of holy water (Greek: ἁγίασμα, hagiasma, whence Turkish: ayazma) situated now in the complex of the Church of St. Mary of the Spring, an important Eastern Orthodox sanctuary.

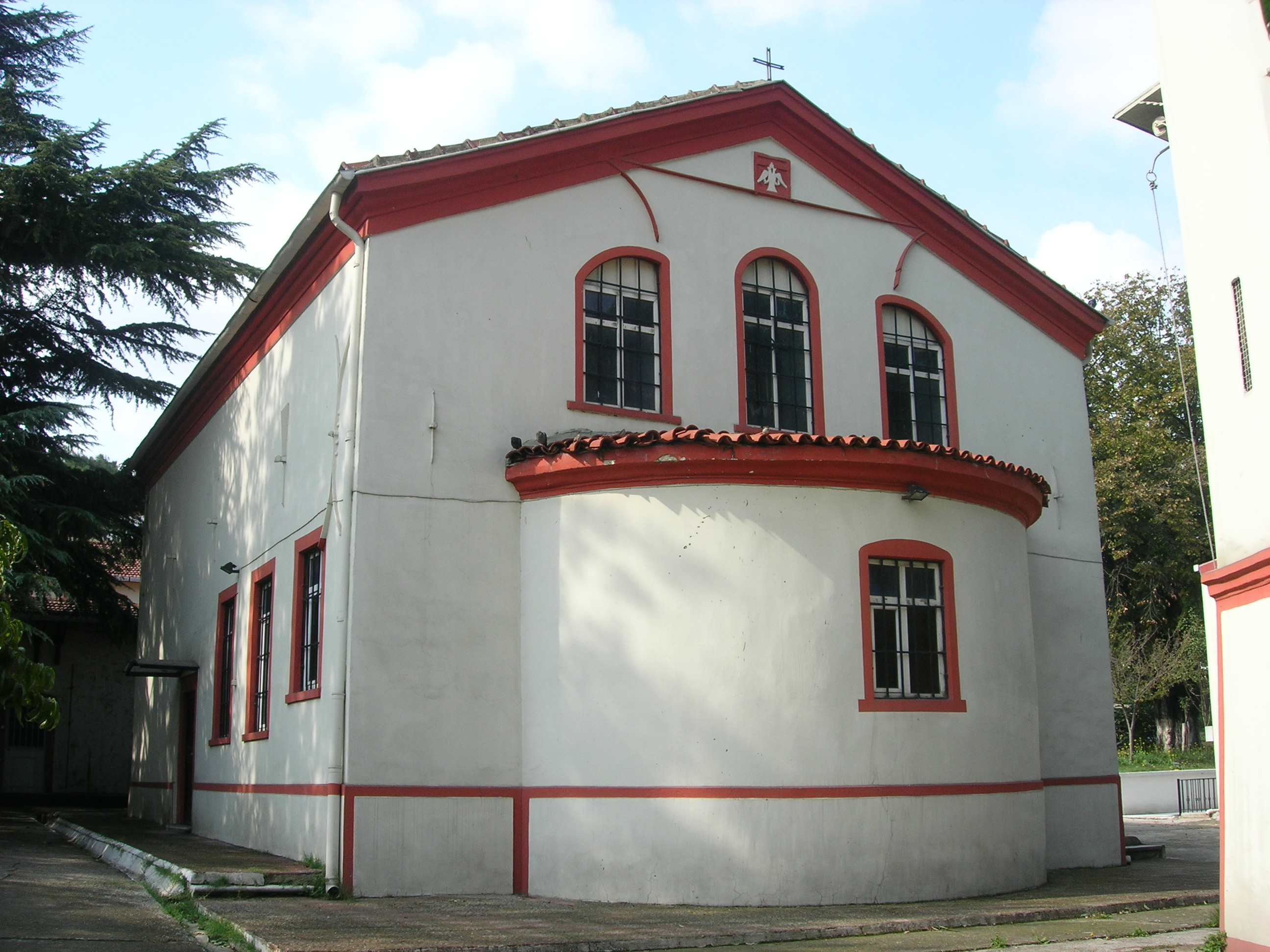
The church of the Balıklı Greek Hospital

In the Byzantine Period it was known as Pege (Greek: Πηγή, meaning "Spring") per antonomasia, always because of the same source. The quarter is characterized by the presence of several Muslim, Eastern Orthodox and Armenian cemeteries, which until now give to it a country-like character. About one kilometer south of the church of St. Mary an important Greek hospital, the Balikli Rum Hastanesi Vakf (“Balikli Greek Hospital Foundation”) and an Armenian Hospital, the Surp Pırgiç Ermeni Hastanesi are active.

== Sources ==
- Mamboury, Ernest (1953). The Tourists' Istanbul. Istanbul: Çituri Biraderler Basımevi.
- Janin, Raymond (1964). Constantinople Byzantine (in French) (2 ed.). Paris: Institut Français d'Etudes Byzantines.
