= Nick Smith Jr. =

American basketball player (born 2004)

- Smith with Real Madrid in 2026

No. 1 – Real Madrid
- Position: Point guard
- League: Liga ACB; EuroLeague

Personal information
- Born: April 18, 2004 (age 22) Jacksonville, Arkansas, U.S.
- Listed height: 6 ft 2 in (1.88 m)
- Listed weight: 185 lb (84 kg)

Career information
- High school: Sylvan Hills (Sherwood, Arkansas); North Little Rock (North Little Rock, Arkansas)
- College: Arkansas (2022–2023)
- NBA draft: 2023: 1st round, 27th overall pick
- Drafted by: Charlotte Hornets
- Playing career: 2023–present

Career history
- 2023–2025: Charlotte Hornets
- 2023–2024: →Greensboro Swarm
- 2025–2026: Los Angeles Lakers
- 2025–2026: →South Bay Lakers
- 2026–present: Real Madrid

Career highlights
- McDonald's All-American (2022); Nike Hoop Summit (2022) (MVP)
- Stats at NBA.com
- Stats at Basketball Reference

Nicholas Smith Jr. (born April 18, 2004) is an American professional basketball player for Real Madrid of the Liga ACB and the EuroLeague. He played college basketball for the Arkansas Razorbacks and was selected with the 27th pick by the Charlotte Hornets in the 2023 NBA draft. Smith attended North Little Rock High School in North Little Rock, Arkansas during his senior year of high school, where he was named the #1 overall recruit in the class of 2022.

== High school career ==
Smith originally attended Sylvan Hills High School in Sherwood, Arkansas before transferring to North Little Rock High School in North Little Rock, Arkansas prior to his senior year. He was the Arkansas Democrat-Gazette All-Arkansas Preps Boys Underclassman of the Year his sophomore year, and Player of the Year his junior and senior seasons. After leading North Little Rock High to a 26–3 record and the Arkansas Class 6A state championship, Smith was selected to play in the 2022 McDonald's All-American Boys Game and the Jordan Brand Classic.

=== Recruiting ===
Smith was a consensus five-star recruit and one of the top players in the 2022 class, according to major recruiting services. On September 29, 2021, he committed to head coach Eric Musselman and the Arkansas Razorbacks, over other finalists Alabama, Auburn and Arkansas–Pine Bluff. Smith also received offers from Oklahoma, Georgetown, Kansas, North Carolina, Baylor, Florida, Butler, Kentucky, Oklahoma State, Texas and Tennessee. Smith was a consensus top five recruit nationally and was named the #1 overall recruit in the 2022 class by 247Sports.

College recruiting
Name	Hometown	School	Height	Weight	Commit date
Nick Smith; PG / SG	Jacksonville, AR	North Little Rock (AR)	6 ft 5 in (1.96 m)	185 lb (84 kg)	Sep 29, 2021
Nick Smith; PG / SG	Recruit ratings: Rivals: 247Sports: ESPN: (94)				
Overall recruit ranking: Rivals: 2 247Sports: 1 ESPN: 3
Note: In many cases, Scout, Rivals, 247Sports, On3, and ESPN may conflict in their listings of height and weight.; In these cases, the average was taken. ESPN grades are on a 100-point scale.; Sources: "Arkansas 2022 Basketball Commitments". Rivals.; "2022 Arkansas Razorbacks Recruiting Class". ESPN.; "2022 Team Ranking". Rivals.

== College career ==
Smith was projected to be a starting guard for the Arkansas Razorbacks for the 2022–23 season, though a persistent knee injury kept him sidelined for the majority of the season. Smith appeared in seventeen games, averaging 12.5 points per contest. He returned late in the season, helping Arkansas advance to the Sweet 16 in the 2023 NCAA Division I men's basketball tournament. Arkansas defeated Illinois in the first round 73-63, and upset #1 seed Kansas in the second round, 72–71. Smith and the Hogs lost to eventual national champion Connecticut in the Sweet 16, 88–65. Arkansas finished the season 22–14.

== Professional career ==
=== Charlotte Hornets (2023–2025) ===
Smith was selected with the 27th pick of the 2023 NBA draft by the Charlotte Hornets and on July 2, he signed with the team. Smith made franchise history with the Hornets during his rookie season by finishing the year with a scorching 43.2% three-point shooting percentage, which placed him among the most efficient rookie shooters in franchise history. He became only the second NBA rookie ever—at age 19 or younger—to hit this efficiency threshold, joining Jayson Tatum (who shot 43.4% in 2017–18). Among all rookies in NBA History, his campaign remains near the top for high-volume, first-year marksmen. This exceptional mark led all rookies in 3-point percentage for the 2023–2024 season. Throughout his rookie and sophomore seasons, he was assigned several times to the Greensboro Swarm. Smith made 60 appearances (27 starts) for the Hornets during the 2024–25 NBA season, averaging 9.9 points, 2.1 rebounds, and 2.4 assists. Smith was waived by the Hornets on September 25, 2025.

=== Los Angeles Lakers (2025–2026) ===
On September 29, 2025, Smith signed a two-way contract with the Los Angeles Lakers. Smith made franchise history by becoming the youngest player in Lakers history to score 25 or more points without attempting a single free throw. He achieved this during a standout performance against the Portland Trail Blazers. Smith also became the 6th player in Lakers franchise to record 25+ points, 5+ assists, and 5+ 3PM off the bench in a regular season game. On April 12, 2026, Smith's contract was converted to a two-year, standard contract. He made 30 total appearances (including one start) for Los Angeles, averaging 6.2 points, 0.8 rebounds, and 1.0 assists. On June 29, the Lakers declined their team option on Smith, making him a free agent.

=== Real Madrid (2026–present) ===
Smith with Real Madrid drives past Collin Malcolm of Anadolu Efes in 2026

On September 16, 2026, Smith agreed to a one-year contract with Real Madrid of the Spanish Liga ACB and the EuroLeague.

== Career statistics ==
Legend
GP	Games played	GS	Games started	MPG	Minutes per game
FG%	Field goal percentage	3P%	3-point field goal percentage	FT%	Free throw percentage
RPG	Rebounds per game	APG	Assists per game	SPG	Steals per game
BPG	Blocks per game	PPG	Points per game	**Bold**	Career high

=== EuroLeague ===
†	Denotes season in which Smith won the EuroLeague
*	Led the league

Year	Team	GP	GS	MPG	FG%	3P%	FT%	RPG	APG	SPG	BPG	PPG	PIR
2026–27	Real Madrid	6	3	13:42	50%	46.7%	**87.5%**	1.9	.7	.6	**.3**	7.9	-

=== Liga ACB ===
†	Denotes season in which Smith won the Liga ACB
*	Led the league

Year	Team	GP	GS	MPG	FG%	3P%	FT%	RPG	APG	SPG	BPG	PPG	PIR
2026–27	Real Madrid	4	2	16:50	60%	17.6%	71.4%	2.5	1.3	0.3	0	9.5	-

=== NBA ===
==== Regular season ====
Year	Team	GP	GS	MPG	FG%	3P%	FT%	RPG	APG	SPG	BPG	PPG
2023–24	Charlotte	51	0	14.3	.391	**.432**	.867	1.4	1.2	.2	**.1**	5.9
2024–25	Charlotte	**60**	**27**	**22.8**	.391	.340	**.935**	**2.1**	**2.4**	**.3**	**.1**	**9.9**
2025–26	L.A. Lakers	30	1	12.5	**.435**	.395	.733	.8	1.0	**.3**	**.1**	6.2
Career		141	28	17.5	.398	.374	.882	1.6	1.7	.3	.1	7.6

==== Playoffs ====
Year	Team	GP	GS	MPG	FG%	3P%	FT%	RPG	APG	SPG	BPG	PPG
2026	L.A. Lakers	6	0	3.0	.429	.429	.500	.2	.2	.2	.2	2.7
Career		6	0	3.0	.429	.429	.500	.2	.2	.2	.2	2.7

=== College ===
Year	Team	GP	GS	MPG	FG%	3P%	FT%	RPG	APG	SPG	BPG	PPG
2022–23	Arkansas	17	14	25.8	.376	.338	.740	1.6	1.7	.8	.1	12.5
