= Damon Jones (disambiguation) =

Damon Jones (born 1976) is an American basketball coach and former player.

Damon Jones may also refer to:

- Damon Jones (American football) (born 1974), former American football player
- Damon Jones (economist), American economist
- Damon Jones (boxer) (born 1993), British boxer
- Damon Jones (baseball) (born 1994), baseball player

== See also ==
- Damian Jones (disambiguation)
