= Damian Jones =

Damian Jones may refer to:

- Damian Jones (basketball) (born 1995), American basketball player
- Damian Jones (producer) (born 1964), British film producer

== See also ==
- Damon Jones (disambiguation)
