= Zeytinburnu =

- District and municipality
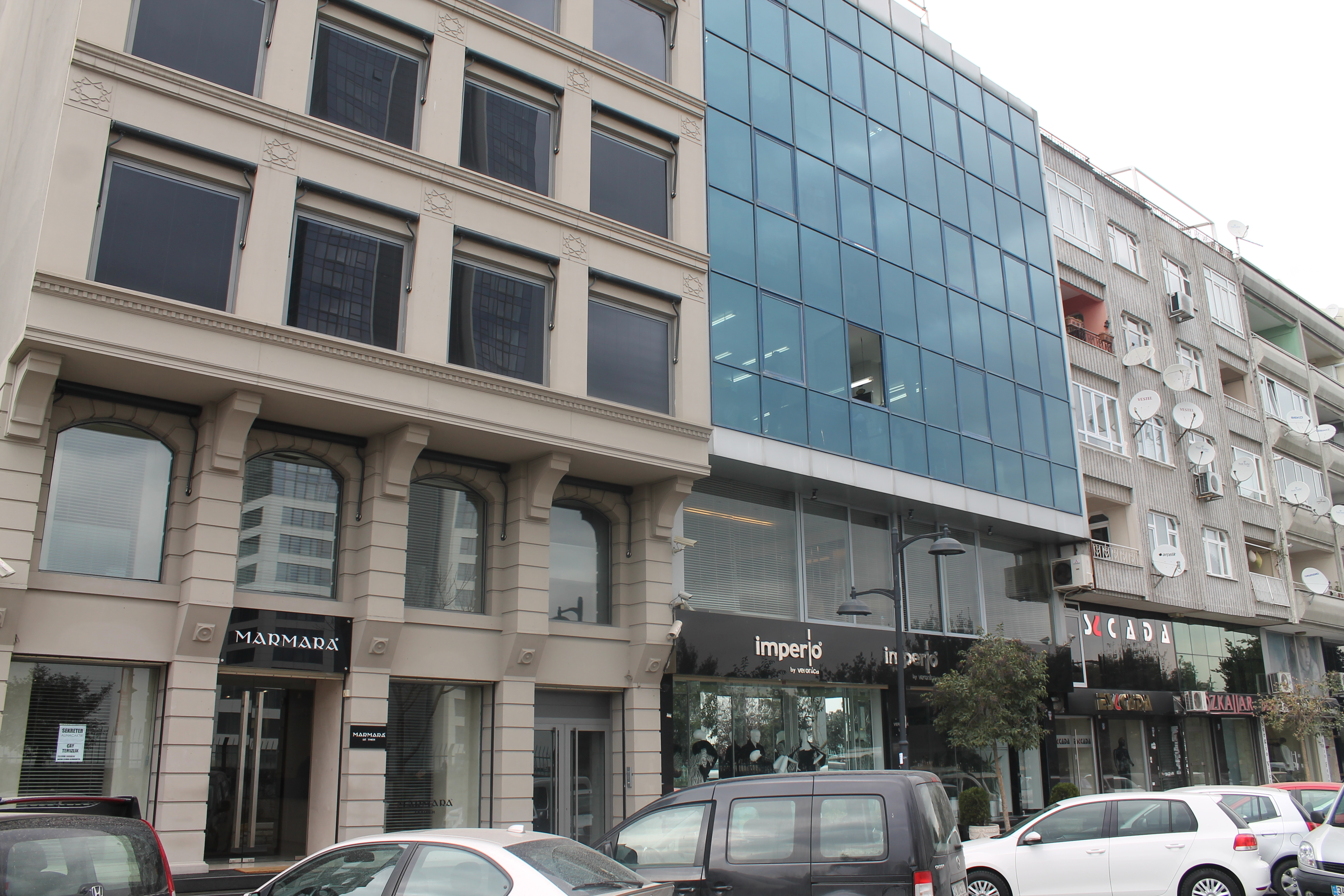
- Hat Boyu Street and leather shops

- Logo

- Map showing Zeytinburnu District in Istanbul Province

- Location within Turkey Location within Istanbul
- Coordinates: 40°58′59″N 28°53′59″E
- Country: Turkey
- Province: Istanbul

Government
  - Mayor: Ömer Arısoy (AKP)
- Area: 12 km^{2} (4.6 sq mi)
- Population (2022): 292,616
  - Density: 24,000/km^{2} (63,000/sq mi)
- Time zone: UTC+3 (TRT)
- Area code: 0212
- Website: zeytinburnu.istanbul

Zeytinburnu (literally, Olive Cape) is a municipality and district of Istanbul Province, Turkey. Its area is 12 km^{2}, and its population is 292,616 (2022). It is a working-class area on the European side of Istanbul, Turkey, on the shore of the Marmara Sea just outside the walls of the ancient city, beyond the fortress of Yedikule.

== Geography ==
Zeytinburnu is located on the part of Çatalca peninsula that is apart from historical peninsula with Walls of Constantinople and overlooks to the Marmara Sea in İstanbul. Its altitude generally increases from south to north, and in south districts (Sümer, Nuripaşa, Kazlıçeşme etc.) embankments, alluvium and former stream beds lay while in north districts (Beştelsiz, Telsiz, Maltepe etc.) wearing surfaces of Bakırköy member (limestone with intercalated clay) lay.

In addition Zeytinburnu is next to the west part of the North Anatolian Fault, according to KOERI-UDİM possibility of an earthquake with M=7.0 in the next 50 years is 60.2% so Zeytinburnu is seismically at risk.

According to the study carried out in 2024, amount of tree cover in Zeytinburnu is 151 Hectare, and its tree cover's percentage is 13.02%. The tree cover of Zeytinburnu has been mostly limited to its graveyards recently, so this district presents the appearance of a concrete jungle.

=== Composition ===
There are 13 neighbourhoods in Zeytinburnu District:

- Beştelsiz
- Çırpıcı
- Gökalp
- Kazlıçeşme
- Maltepe
- Merkezefendi
- Nuripaşa
- Seyitnizam
- Sümer
- Telsiz
- Veliefendi
- Yenidoğan
- Yeşiltepe

== History ==
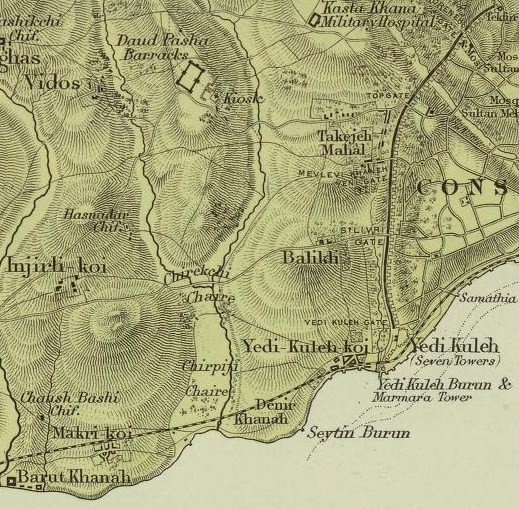
In the map, "Seytin Burun" is a little cape which originates from settlements in old Zeytinburnu: Balıklı and Yedikule

Zeytinburnu was a fortress and settlement known as Kyklobion (Greek: Κυκλόβιον) or Strongylon (Στρογγυλόν) during the Byzantine period, its name referring to the circular shape of the fortress.

The fortress was built in Late Antiquity as part of a series of strongholds that guarded the coastal road leading to Constantinople. It is first attested during the reign of Justinian I (527–565). Kyklobion was used as the landing-site of the Arab armies on both of their assaults on Constantinople, in 674 and in 717. In the early 8th century, the iconodule Saint Hilarion was kept prisoner in the local monastery on the orders of Emperor Leo V the Armenian (r. 813–820). The site is again, and for the last time in Byzantine times, mentioned in a property deed of 1388.

After the Fall of Constantinople in 1453, the name Kyklobion was transferred to the Yedikule Fortress by the local Greeks, and the original site was abandoned. Ruins of the original circular fortress survived until the 19th century, where the Austrian traveller Hammer-Purgstall saw them. Its name at the time was called in Greek Elaion Akra, "Cape of the Olive Trees"; the modern Turkish name has the same meaning.

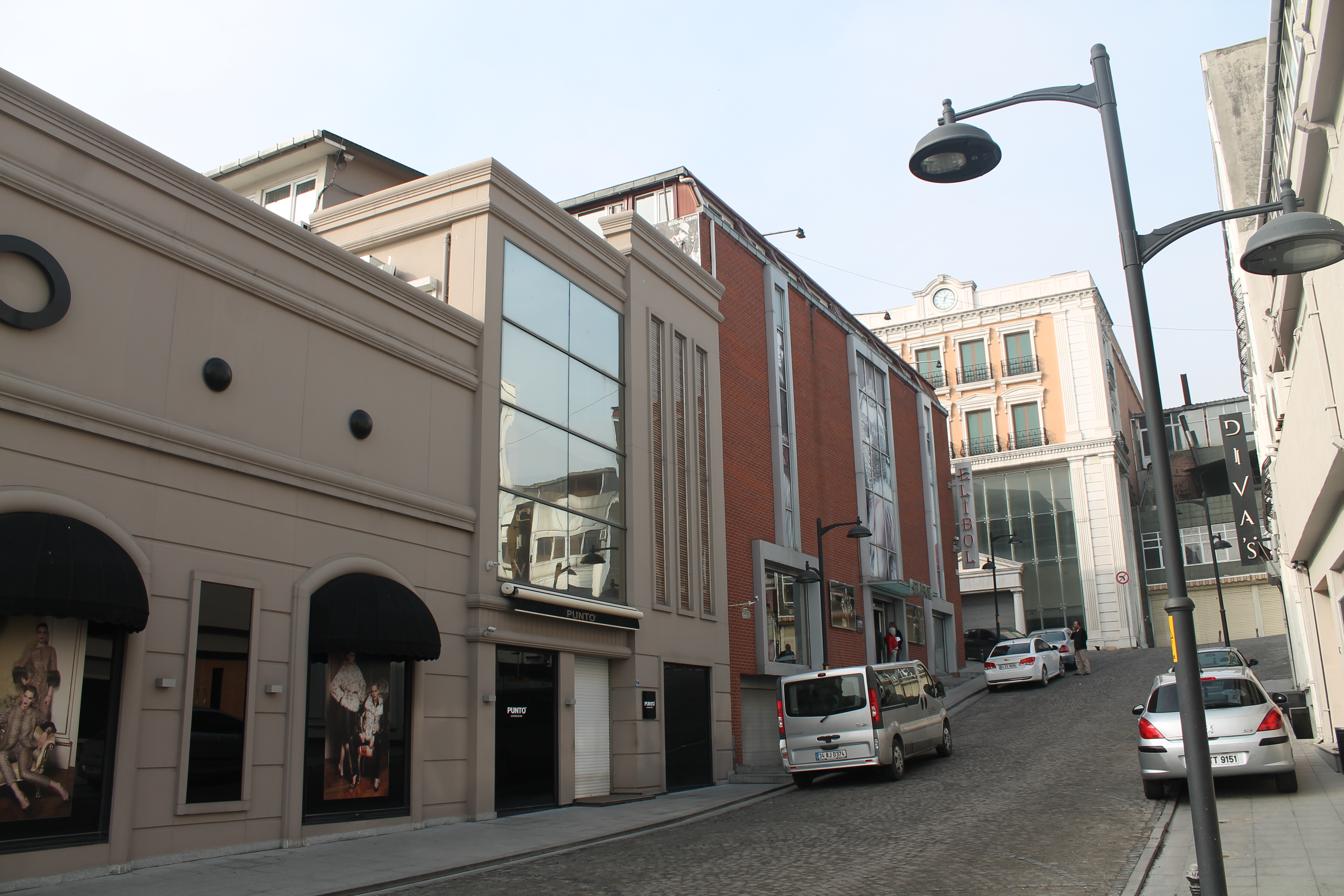
Zeytinburnu is known for its rows of large wholesale shops and outlets for leather and fur clothing, accessories and textiles

From the early 19th century onwards Zeytinburnu was an industrial village, centred on the leather industry of the area called Kazlıçeşme, which being on the coast with a good water supply was well suited to leather production. (the area was named for a fountain with a goose carved into the stonework, the fountain is still in existence). Up until the mid-20th century the residents were an urban mix of Greeks, Armenians, Bulgarians, Jews and Turks and still today the Yedikule Surp Pırgiç Armenian Hospital is active in Kazlıçeşme, and has a museum in the grounds.

During World War I, the Ottoman era munitions factory in Zeytinburnu was bombed by British aircraft in two air raids in 1916 and 1918.

The character of Zeytinburnu changed when a large wave of immigrants from Anatolia came and settled there from 1950 on. Zeytinburnu is an important lesson for city planning in Turkey, because it was one of the first gecekondu districts. In other words, most of the buildings were built illegally, without infrastructure, and without any aesthetical concern. In the 1960s legislation was passed to prevent this type of building but by then this type of development had become unstoppable. At first these were little brick-built single storey cottages. From the 1970s onwards the little houses were replaced by multi-storey concrete apartment blocks built in rows with no space in between. In most cases the ground floor was used as a small textile workshop, and thus Zeytinburnu became a bustling industrial area with a large residential population living above the workshops. All this was still illegal, unplanned and lacked the infrastructure and the aesthetic appeal. After a heavy rain the streets would run with dirty water for days.

Mosaic floor tiles were discovered during the restoration of the Zeytinburnu Kazlıçeşme Cultural Center. The mosaics date to the Late Roman and early Byzantine period.

=== Historical places ===
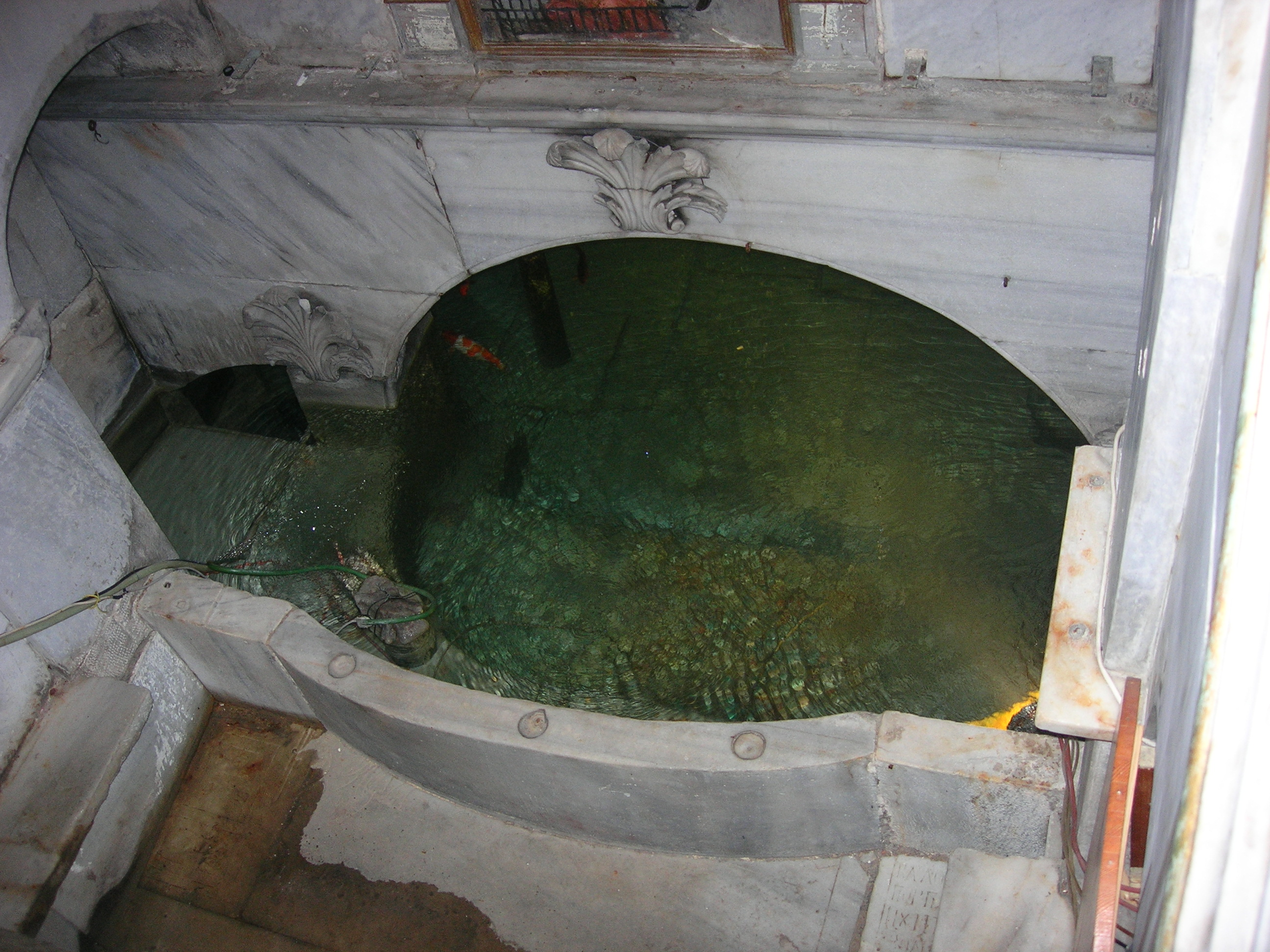
Sacred fish at the Greek Church of St. Mary of the Spring, also known as the Balıklı Church

- Balıklı
- Holy Spring
- Balıklı Church
- Balıklı Greek Hospital
- Çırpıcı Meadows
- Kirazlıçeşme Fatih Mosque
- Hacı Mahmud Ağa Dervish Lodge
- Kazlı Çeşme (Goose Fountain)
- Merkez Efendi Dervish Lodge
- Merzifonlu Kara Mustafa Pasha Masjid
- Perişan Baba Dervish Lodge
- Seyyid Nizam Dervish Lodge
- Walls of Constantinople
- Yedikule Surp Pırgiç Armenian Hospital
- Takkeci İbrahim Ağa Mosque
- Yenikapı Mevlevîhane
- Zeytinburnu Military Hospital
- Cemeteries in Zeytinburnu

=== Zeytinburnu today ===
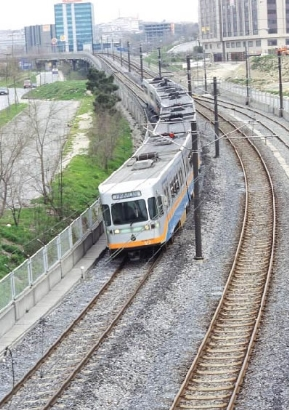
A light rail stock at the Zeytinburnu tram station

The leather industry has largely moved out to Tuzla now but the rows of six-storey blocks of housing and textiles remain. Although some improvements have been made to the streets and drainage, the area still has a stereotypical reputation for being the home of tough men and uncontrollable youths who drive around in cars blasting out pop music at high-volume. This is possibly exaggerated nowadays, and steps are being taken to smarten up the area. Most residents are working class, recent migrants from Anatolia, typically lacking in education. However, the younger generations are more educated thus changing the demographic shape of Zeytinburnu.

To integrate the district with the rest of Istanbul, the municipality has improved the transportation by extending the modern tram line to Zeytinburnu, and the main tram station is now at the intersection of the metro line leading to Atatürk International Airport and Aksaray and fast tram lines leading to Istanbul's inter-city coach station and the old city in Eminönü. Moreover, Zeytinburnu has a station on the suburban railway line Sirkeci-Halkalı. Other important projects have improved the transportation, life quality and the economy of the district. Olivium Outlet Center was opened in 2000, a modern shopping mall with cinemas, with many shops specializing in factory surpluses, bringing new shopping opportunities for the people of Zeytinburnu and surrounding districts. The mall attracts many visitors on weekends.

There is an Alevi community served by the Erikli Baba Cemevi. There are large minority groups of Kazakhs and Turkmens, who generally work in the textile industry, contributing to the Turkish economy. The Zeytinburnu-based Nasco Nasreddin Holding A.S. was categorized as an Al-Qaeda ally by the United Nations. It was involved in terrorist financing. The Romanian government legislated this status for Zeytinburnu Nasco Nasreddin Holding A. S., as well as the Slovak government.

On 10 December 2014, in Zeytinburnu, an assassin killed the anti-Uzbekistan government Islamist Uzbek Imam Shaykh Abdullah Bukhoroy (Abdullah Bukhari). It took place outside of a Madrassa.

The Turkish-run English language BGN News news agency reported that the Turkish Meydan newspaper discovered that Uyghur fighters joining the Islamist terrorist organization ISIL were being helped by businessman Nurali T., who led a network based in Zeytinburnu, which produced counterfeit Turkish passports numbering up to 100,000 distributed to Uyghurs from China to help them go to Turkey form where they would enter Iraq and Syria to join ISIL. Uyghurs from China would travel to Malaysia via Cambodia and Thailand and then to Turkey, since a visa is not needed for travel between Turkey and Malaysia, then stay at locations in Istanbul, and then go to Iraq and Syria by traveling to southeastern Turkey. The information was revealed by AG who participates in the network, who noted that even though Turkish authorities are able to detect the fake passports they do not deport the Uyghurs and allow them into Turkey. AG said that: “Turkey has secret deals with the Uighurs. The authorities first confiscate the passports but then release the individuals.”

Seven Uyghur restaurant workers, who provided money to the perpetrator of the 2017 Istanbul nightclub attack for his taxi fare, were arrested in Zeytinburnu. The restaurant was owned by Şemseddin Dursun. The Seferoğlu Sokak-based Uyghurs in Zeytinburnu aided the attacker when he fled the nightclub. As a result, Zeytinburnu became the site of over 50 police sweeps against "East Turkistanis" (Uyghurs), Kazakhs, Kyrgyz, and Uzbeks. Zeytinburnu is infamous for being used by Syria-destined jihadists as a transit point. An Uzbek national committed the nightclub attack according to the Turkish police. Turkish media said he was from the "East Turkestan" wing of ISIS. Erdoğan's government has deliberately facilitated the travel of Jihadist Uyghurs through Zeytinburnu, with Turkish intelligence involved and the nightclub massacre at Reina is a result of this. Turkey nabbed Abuliezi Abuduhamiti and Omar Asim, both Uyghurs.

There are more than 100,000 unregistered people of Xinjiang and Central Asian origin in Zeytinburnu. Zeytinburnu, among other districts such as Küçükçekmece, Başakşehir, Bağcılar, Gaziosmanpaşa, Esenler, Bayrampaşa, and Fatih, is home to many refugees of Syrian origin.

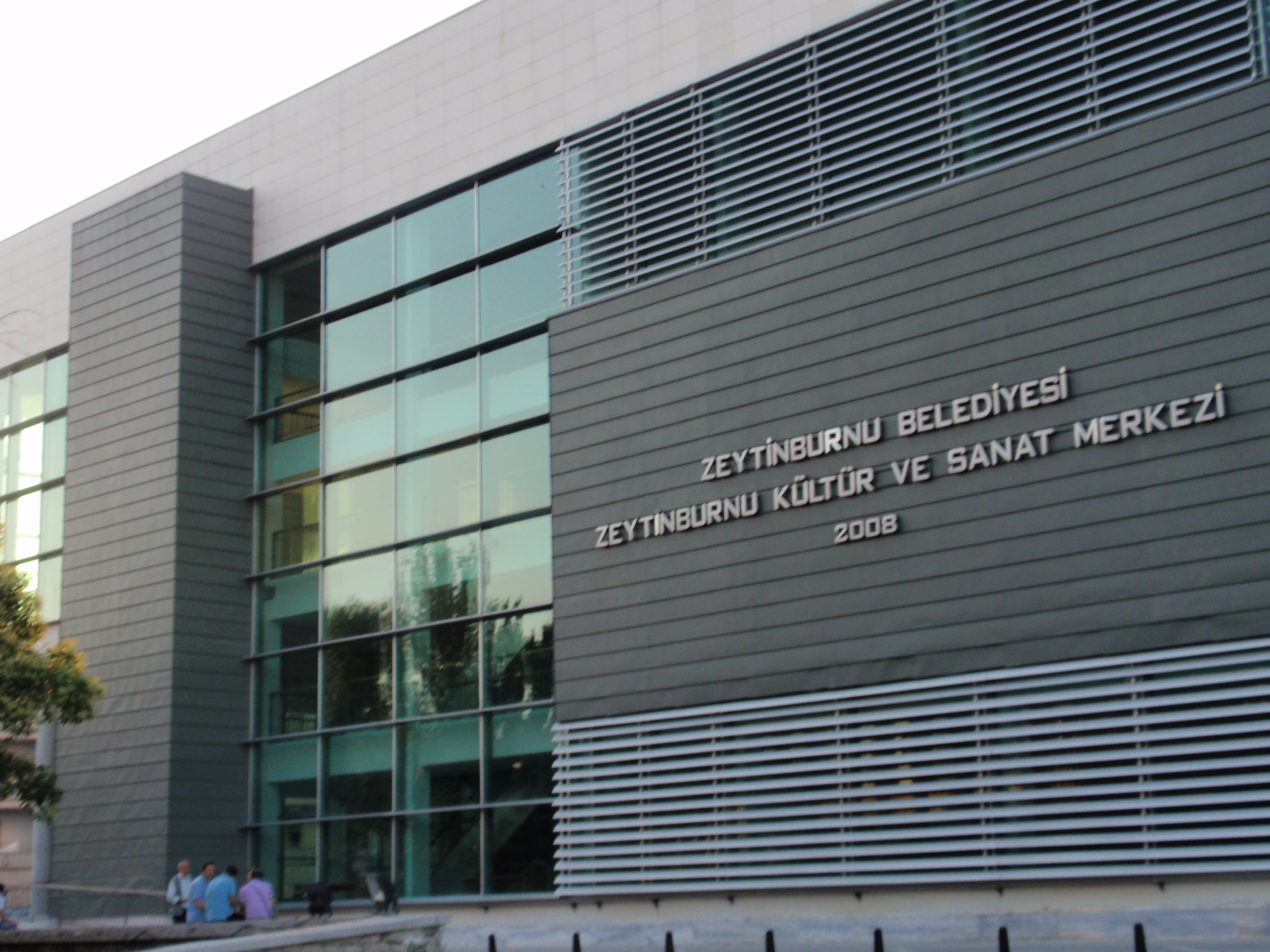
Zeytinburnu Culture and Art Center

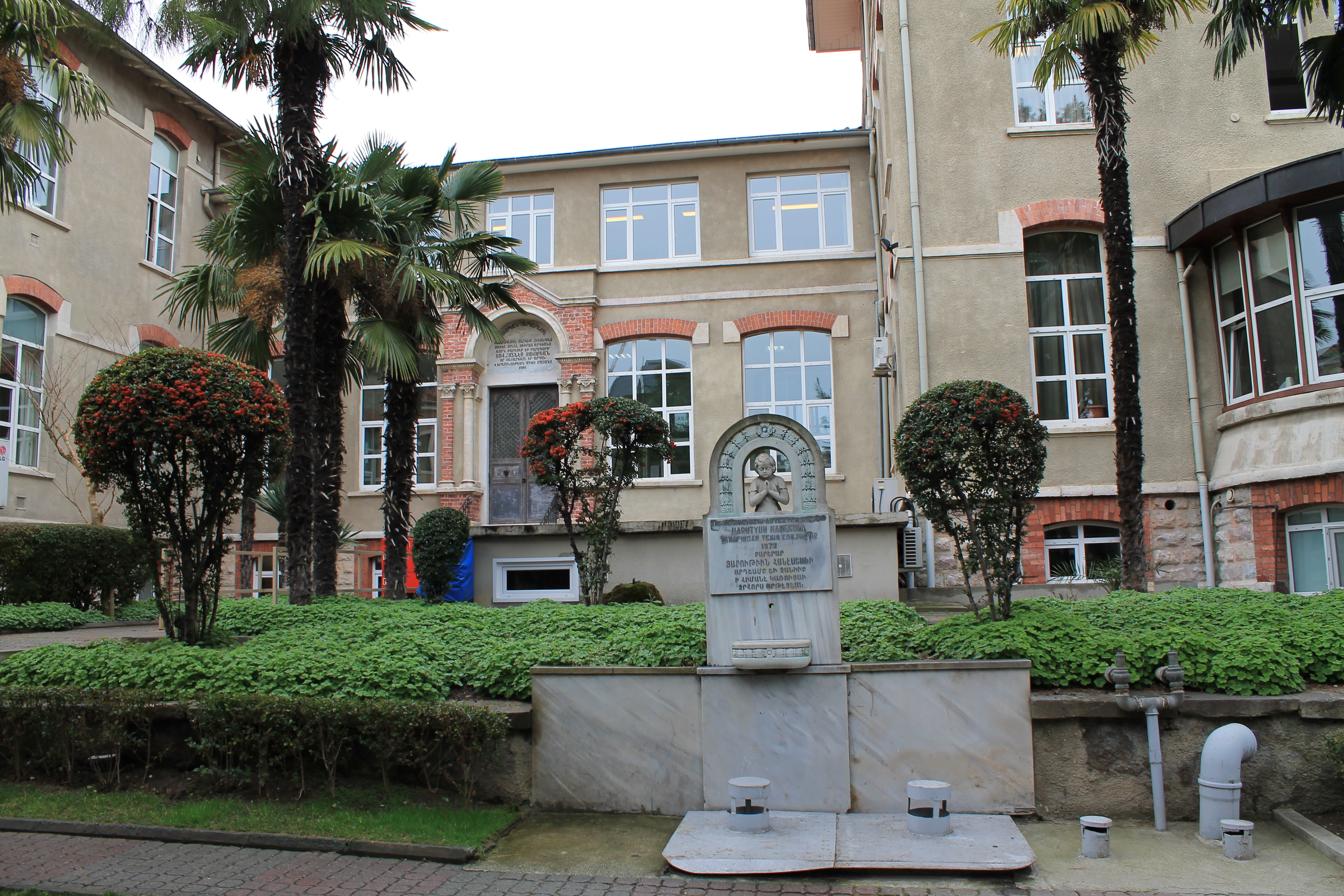
Armenian Hospital

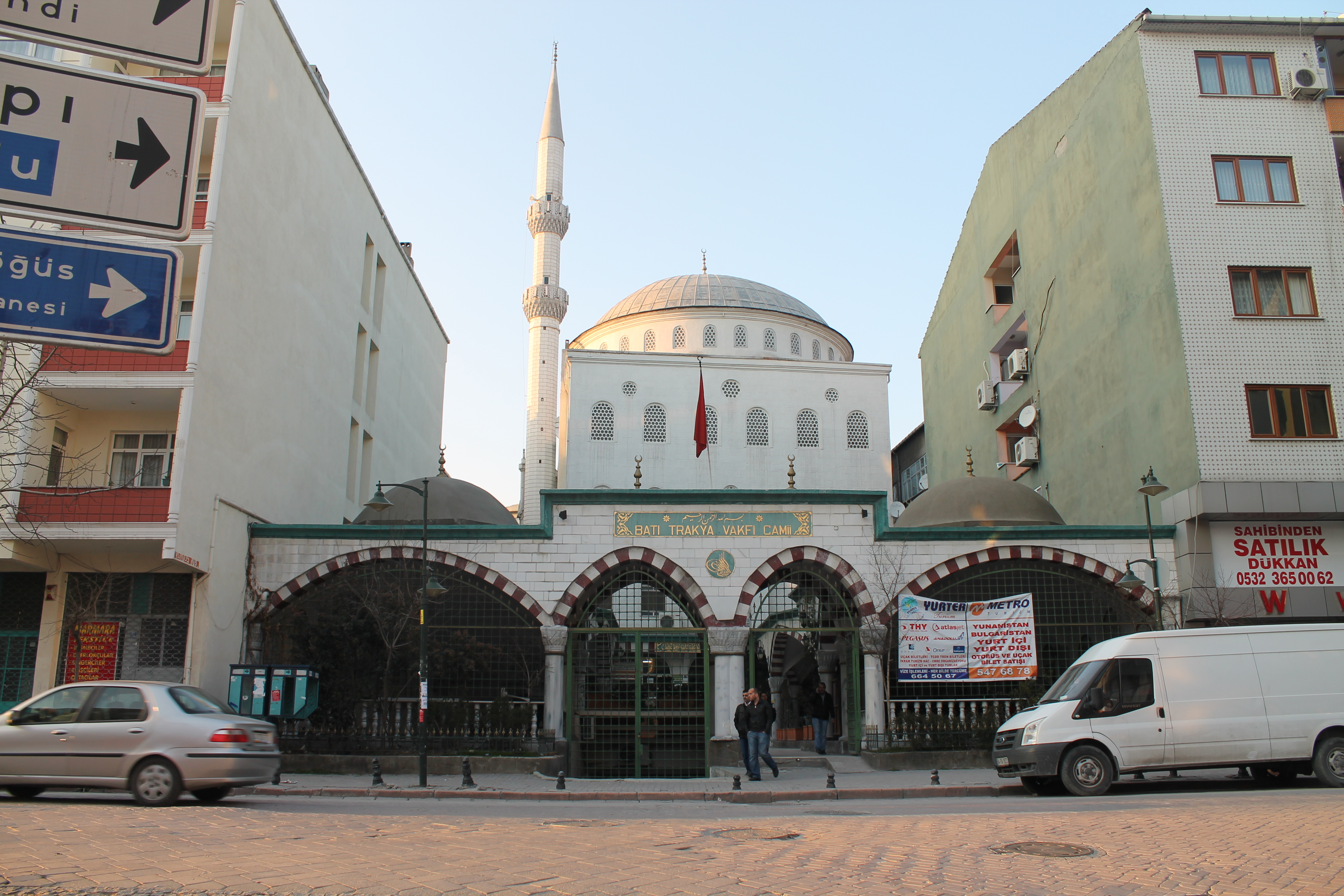
Mosque of the Turks of Western Thrace Foundation

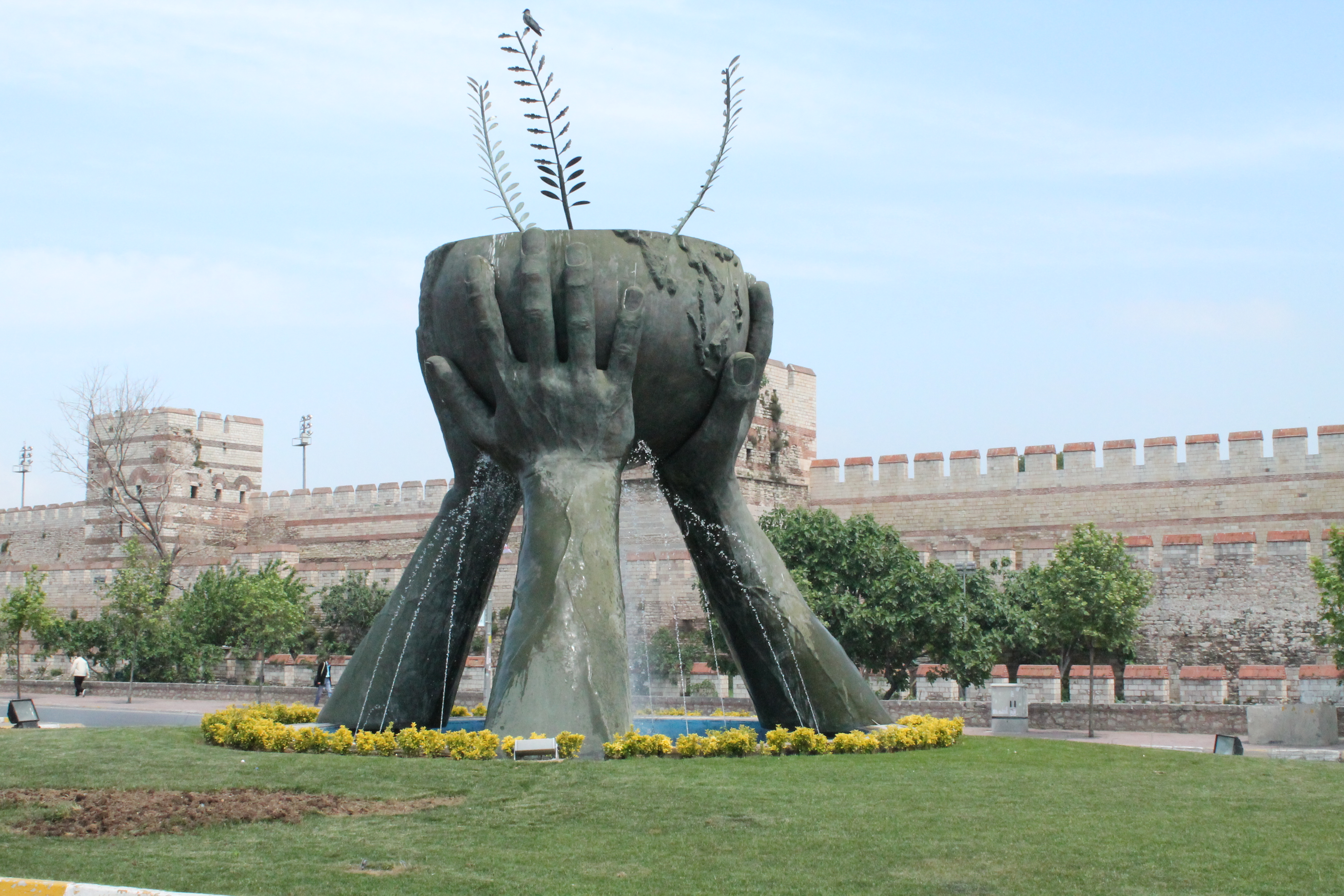
Belgrad Gate

== Environment ==
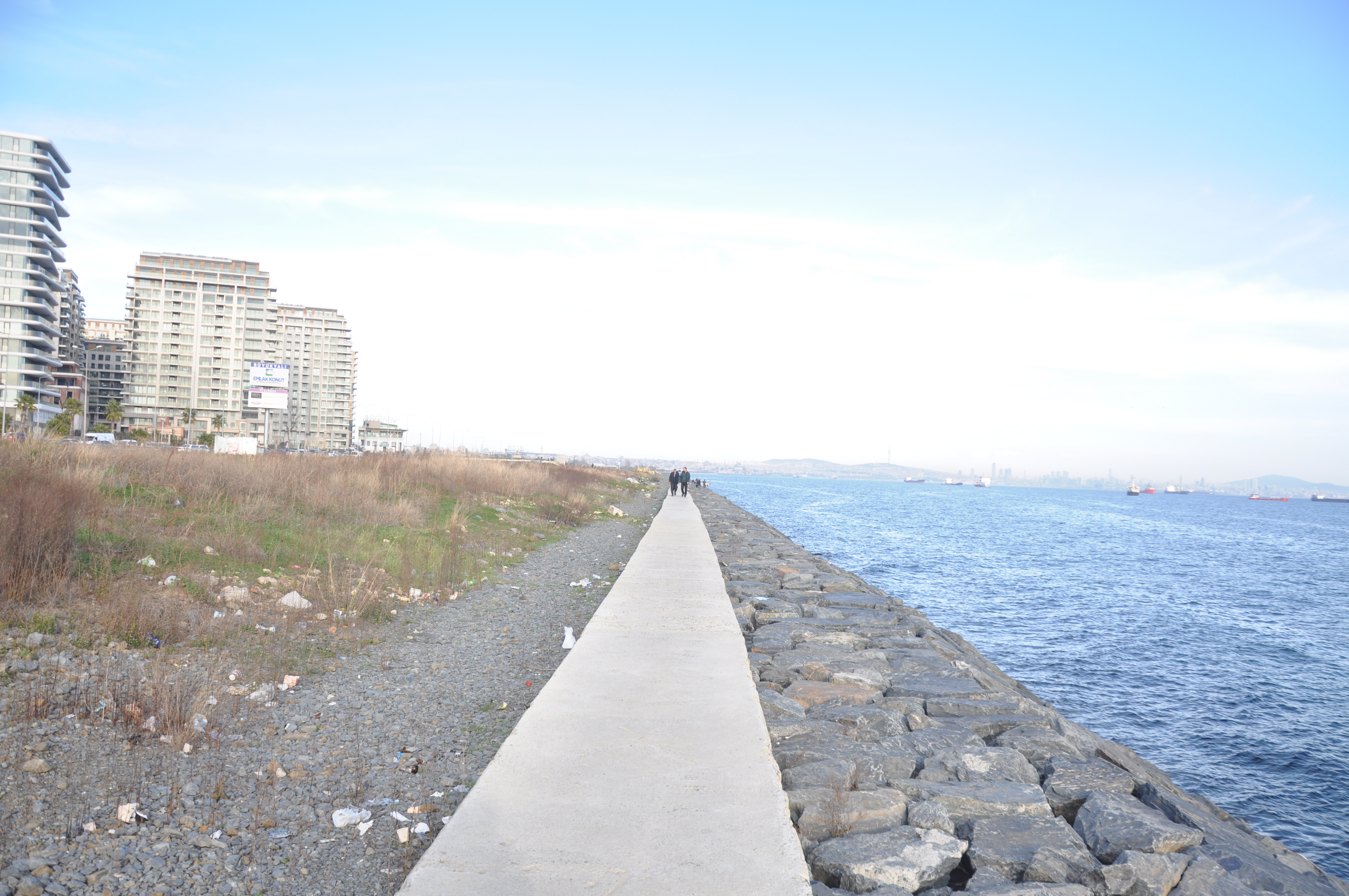
Problematic residences on the coast of Zeytinburnu

Zeytinburnu is a very crowded county of İstanbul, so it undergoes a dense housing. Around coastal areas of Zeytinburnu the government ignored the court decisions and committed gentrification and ecocide. While public lands next to the coast were transformed to residences, between Zeytinburnu and its coast a concrete wall was constructed.

== Sports ==
=== Teams ===
Football

Zeytinburnuspor, a top-flight football team in the early 1990s, is now languishing in the minor leagues. Arif Erdem and Emre Belözoğlu started their careers here. Matjaž Cvikl (1967–1999) from the Slovenia national football team also played there.

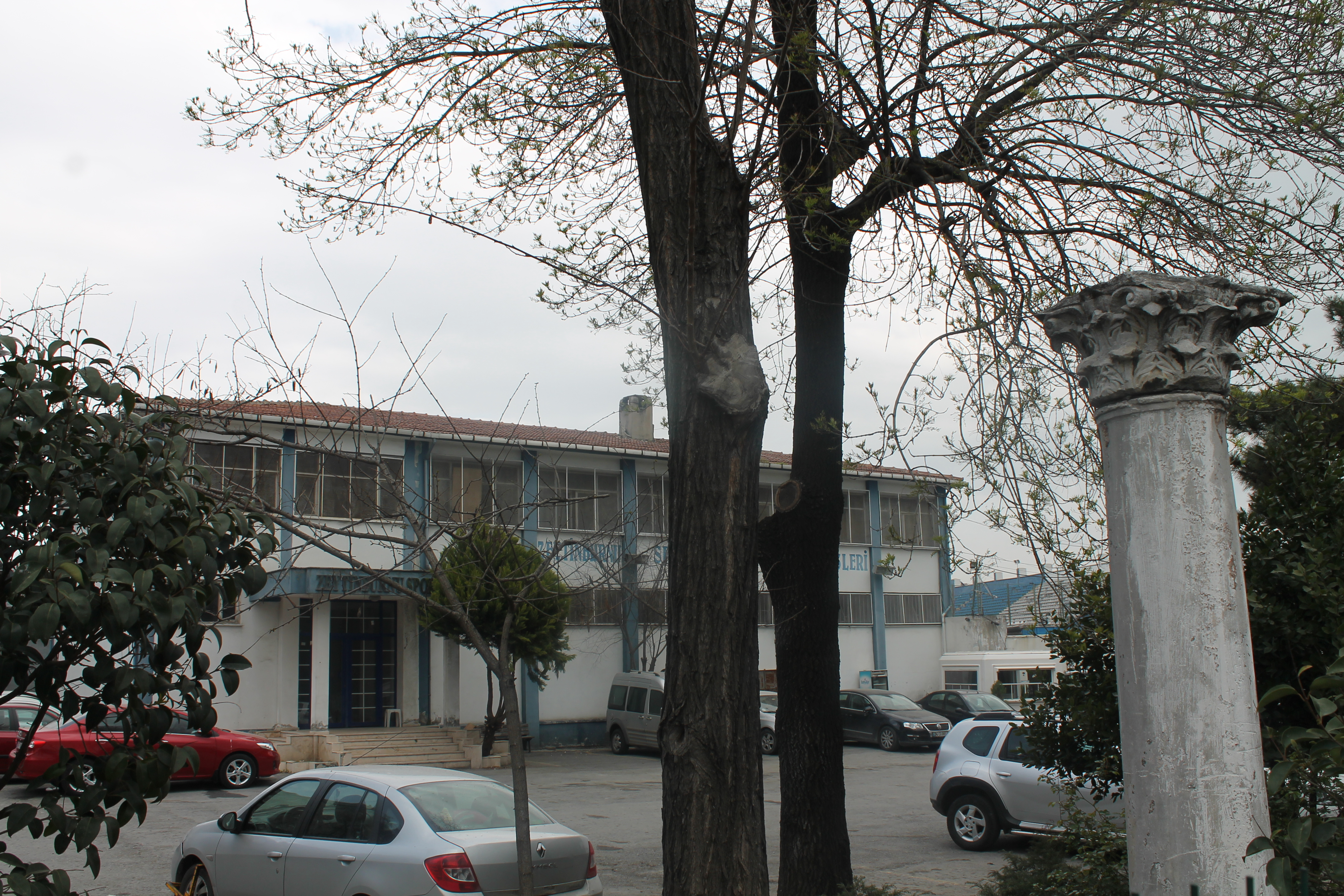
Zeytinburnuspor facility, with a Corinthian column in the foreground

The women's football team played once in the Turkish Women's First Football League.

Ice hockey

The 2010-established men's ice hockey team of Zeytinburnu Belediyespor finished the 2013–14 Turkish Ice Hockey Super League (TBHSL) season as the runner-up. They became the champion in the following 2014–15 and 2015–16 seasons.

=== Venues ===
Zeytinburnu Stadium with a total capacity of 16,000 people, is home to the football teams of Zeytinburnu.

The Zeytinburnu Ice Rink, opened in 2016, is a mobile ice rink, which hosted the home 2015–16 season matches of the Zeytinburnu Belediyespor ice hockey team.

== Town twinning ==
Zeytinburnu is twinned with:

- Narimanov, Azerbaijan
- Kuala, Azerbaijan
- (Palestine) Beit Hanoun, Palestinian territories
- Semey, Kazakhstan
- Taraz, Kazakhstan
- Shkodra, Albania

== Mayor Government of Zeytinburnu ==
- 1984–1989 – Muzaffer Çavuşoğlu Anavatan Party
- 1989–1994 – Hasan Yılmaz SHP
- 1994–1995 Adil Emecan DSP
- 1995–1999 – Adil Emecan Anavatan Party
- 1999–2001 Murat Aydın Fazilet Party
- 2001–2019 – Murat Aydın AK Party
- 2019–present – Ömer Arısoy AK Party
