= Kazlıçeşme, Zeytinburnu =

Kazlıçeşme
- Neighbourhood
- Location in Turkey Kazlıçeşme (Istanbul)
- Coordinates: 40°59′14″N 28°54′36″E
- Country: Turkey
- Province: Istanbul
- District: Zeytinburnu
- Population (2022): 4,844
- Time zone: UTC+3 (TRT)
- Postal code: 34020
- Area code: 0212

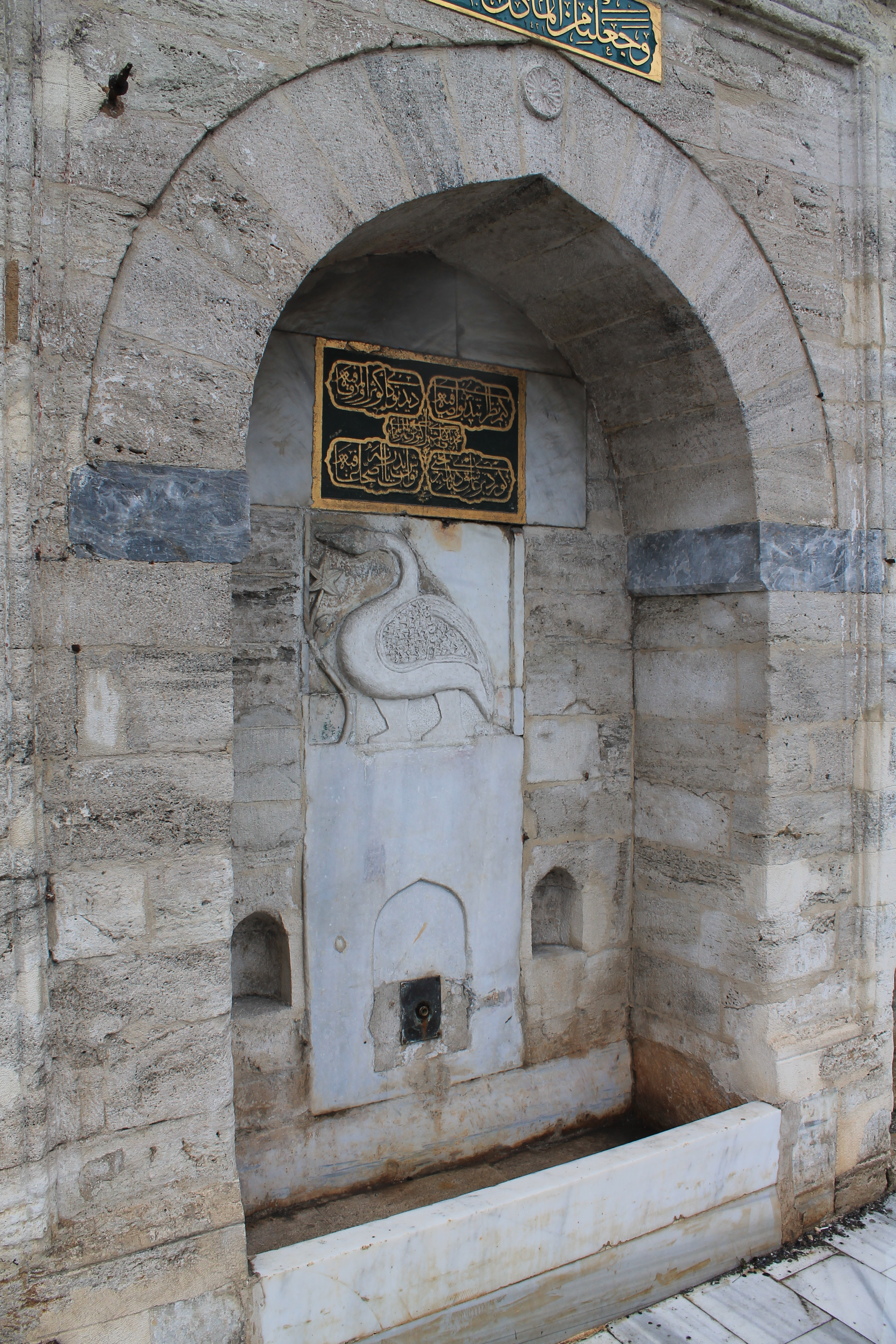
The fountain with the goose figure on that gave to the locality its name.

Kazlıçeşme is a neighbourhood (Turkish: mahalle) in the municipality and district of Zeytinburnu, Istanbul Province, Turkey. Its population is 4,844 (2022). Chartered in 1957, it is the least populous neighborhood of Zeytinburnu. The locality took its name from the historic fountain (Turkish: çeşme) with a relief goose (Turkish: kaz) figure below the fountain's inscription, which dates it back to Hijri year AH 953 (AD 1537).

Stretching between Bakırköy district in the southwest and Fatih district in the northeast, where it borders to the historic Walls of Constantinople, the area covers the entire coast line of Zeytinburnu at the Sea of Marmara. The 13 km (8.1 mi) long shoreline road Kennedy Avenue connecting Sirkeci with Bakırköy runs through Kazlıçeşme.

== History ==
Kazlıçeşme was assigned for slaughterhouse, tannery and chandlery by a decret of Ottoman sultan Mehmed the Conqueror (reigned 1444–46 and 1451–81) soon after the conquest of Constantinople in 1453. Kazlıçeşme was chosen as a place outside the city walls due to the very bad smell produced by ancient tanneries. There were 360 tanneries and 33 butcheries in Kazlıçeşme at a time. The tanneries and the factories of leatherware industry in the area moved in 1993, to a modern industrial zone in Tuzla district on the Asian of Istanbul established for that special purpose. After all the leather industry left Kazlıçeşme, the old factory buildings were demolished, and the area became a big public space, which is used today for political and social activity rallies.

== Places of interest ==
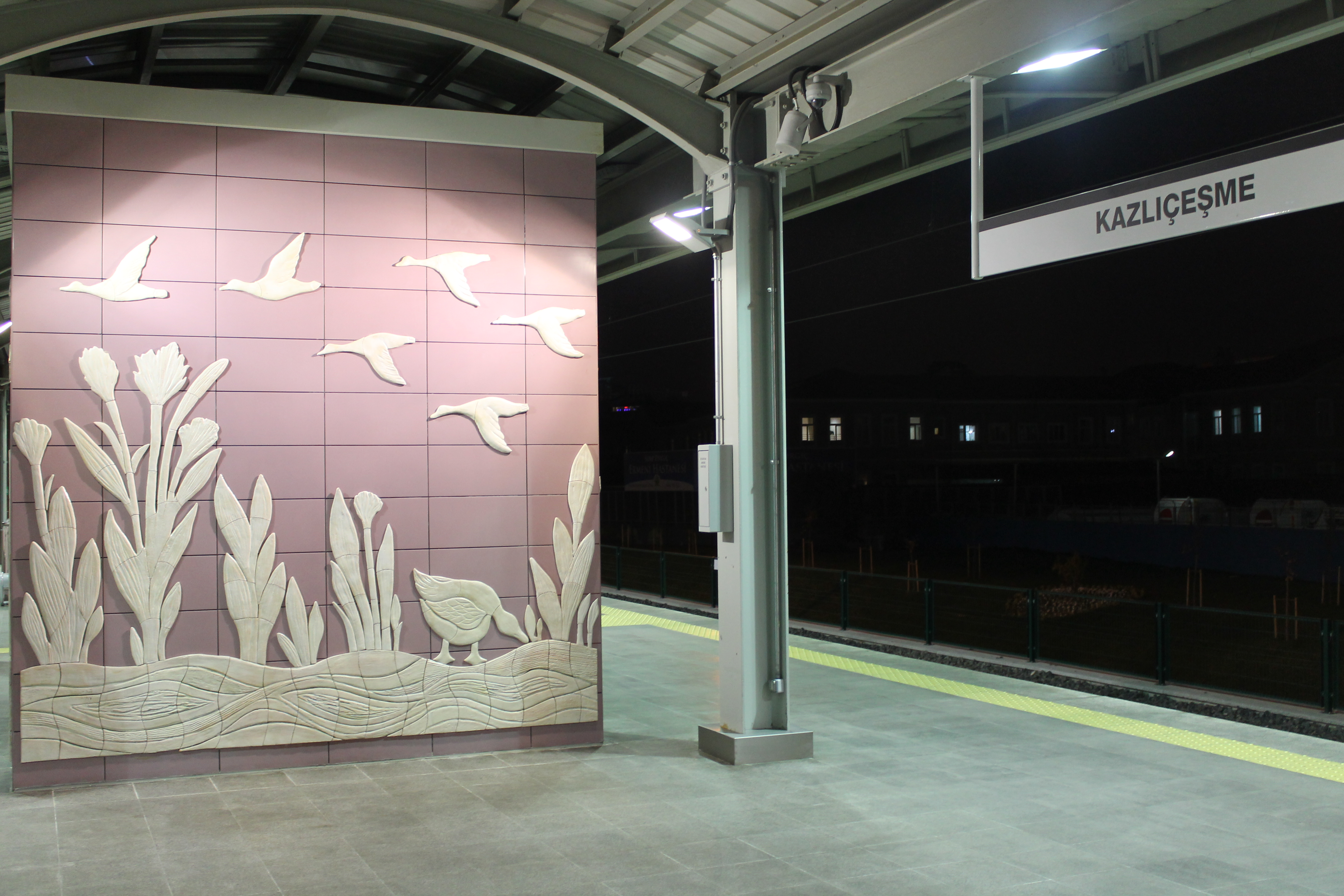
Kazlıçeşme station of Marmaray

Some of the historic religious buildings in Kazlıçeşme are Kazlıçeşme Fatih Mosque, which is ascribed to Sultan Mehmed the Conqueror and considered so as one of the first two mosques built by Turks in Istanbul, Eriklibaba Tekke and Merzifonlu Kara Mustafa Pasha Masjid.

The multi-purpose indoor venue Abdi İpekçi Arena, demolished in 2018, was situated here. Kazlıçeşme is also the place, where historic buildings of the Greek and Armenian communities, such as the Balıklı Greek Hospital and Yedikule Surp Pırgiç Armenian Hospital, are found.

== Transports ==
The railway station of Kazlıçeşme, which served the Sirkeci-Halkalı commuter rail line was taken out of service on March 1, 2013, in the frame of improvement works for the Marmaray project. With the opening of Marmaray's first stage on October 29, 2013, Kazlıçeşme railway station became the provisory western terminus of the line, which starts at Ayrılıkçeşmesi on the Asiatic part of Istanbul and crosses the Bosphorus undersea.

Preceding station	Turkish State Railways	Following station
Zeytinburnu towards Halkalı	Istanbul suburban	Yedikule towards Sirkeci

Established in 1999, the Port of Zeytinburnu (aka Zeyport) has five piers with a total of 1,000 m (3,300 ft) long quay, and is able to serve ten vessels up to 3,900 gross tonnage each simultaneously. In the 2000s, the international port was frequently used by Russian and Ukrainian tourists.

== Population ==
The population of Kazlıçeşme in its close timeline is shown in the list below.

Historical population

Year	Pop.	±% p.a.
1960	537	—
1965	4,684	+54.22%
1970	3,616	−5.04%
1975	3,682	+0.36%
1980	3,563	−0.65%
1985	721	−27.35%
1990	1,316	+12.79%

Year	Pop.	±% p.a.
1997	1,539	+2.26%
2000	767	−20.72%
2007	1,381	+8.76%
2012	1,609	+3.10%
2017	2,078	+5.25%
2022	4,844	+18.44%

Source: Zeytinburnu Municipality (1960-1990, 2000), Zeytinburnu Municipality (1997) and TÜIK (2007-2022)
