= Fountain of Life (iconography) =

Christian iconographic symbol

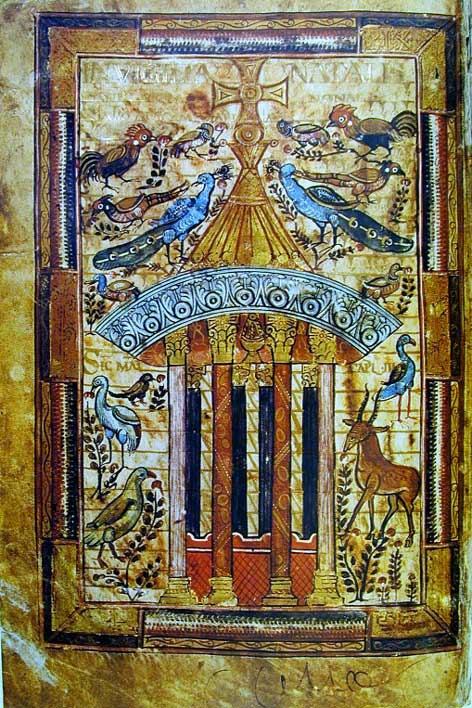
Godescalc Evangelistary, commemorating the Baptism of Charlemagne's son in Rome in 781 with an image of the Fountain of Life.

The Fountain of Life or Fountain of Living Waters is a Christian iconographic symbol associated with baptism and the eucharist. It first appearing in the 5th century in illuminated manuscripts and later in other art forms such as panel paintings. The iconographic Fountain of Life is connected to older traditions of a physical fountain that gives immortality, also known as the Fountain of Youth.

== Baptismal font ==
The symbol is usually shown as a fountain enclosed in a hexagonal structure capped by a rounded dome and supported by eight columns. The fountain of living waters, fons vivus is a baptismal font (a water fountain in which one is baptized, and thus reborn with Christ), and is often surrounded by animals associated with Baptism such as the hart. The font probably represents the octagonal Lateran Baptistery in Rome, consecrated by Pope Sixtus III (432-440), which was iconographically associated with the fountain of the water of life mentioned in Revelation 21:6.

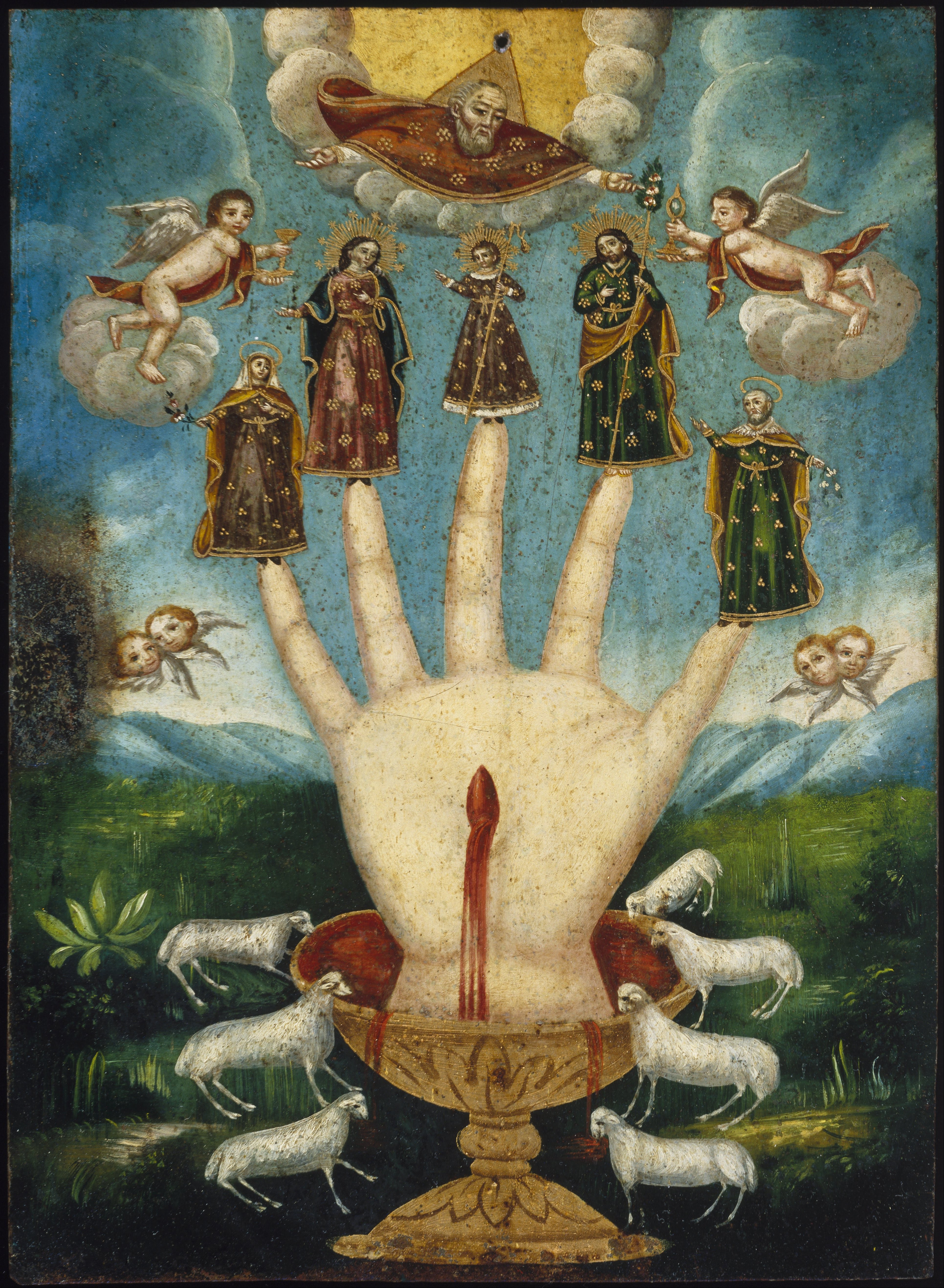
The fountain of blood icon in a Mexican painting, 18th century (Brooklyn Museum)

The best examples date from the Carolingian period: the Godescalc Evangelistary made to commemorate the Baptism of the son of Charlemagne in 781, and in the Soissons Gospels.

== Fountain of blood ==
In the Ghent Altarpiece: The Adoration of the Lamb by Jan van Eyck (1438), the Lamb of God stands upon an altar dressed as for the Mass of the Precious Blood, with a blood-red frontal: the Lamb's blood is caught in a chalice, and its Eucharistic intention is signaled by the dove of the Holy Spirit above. In the foreground, offering the other means of grace, is the Fountain of the Living Water surrounded by the faithful. In the Prado, Madrid, is the Fountain of Living Water emanating from the Lamb of God, in which the open fountain is set into the outer wall of Heaven. That the water is not merely the purifying water of baptism is shown by the innumerable wafers that float upon its surface: the two sacraments are represented as one.

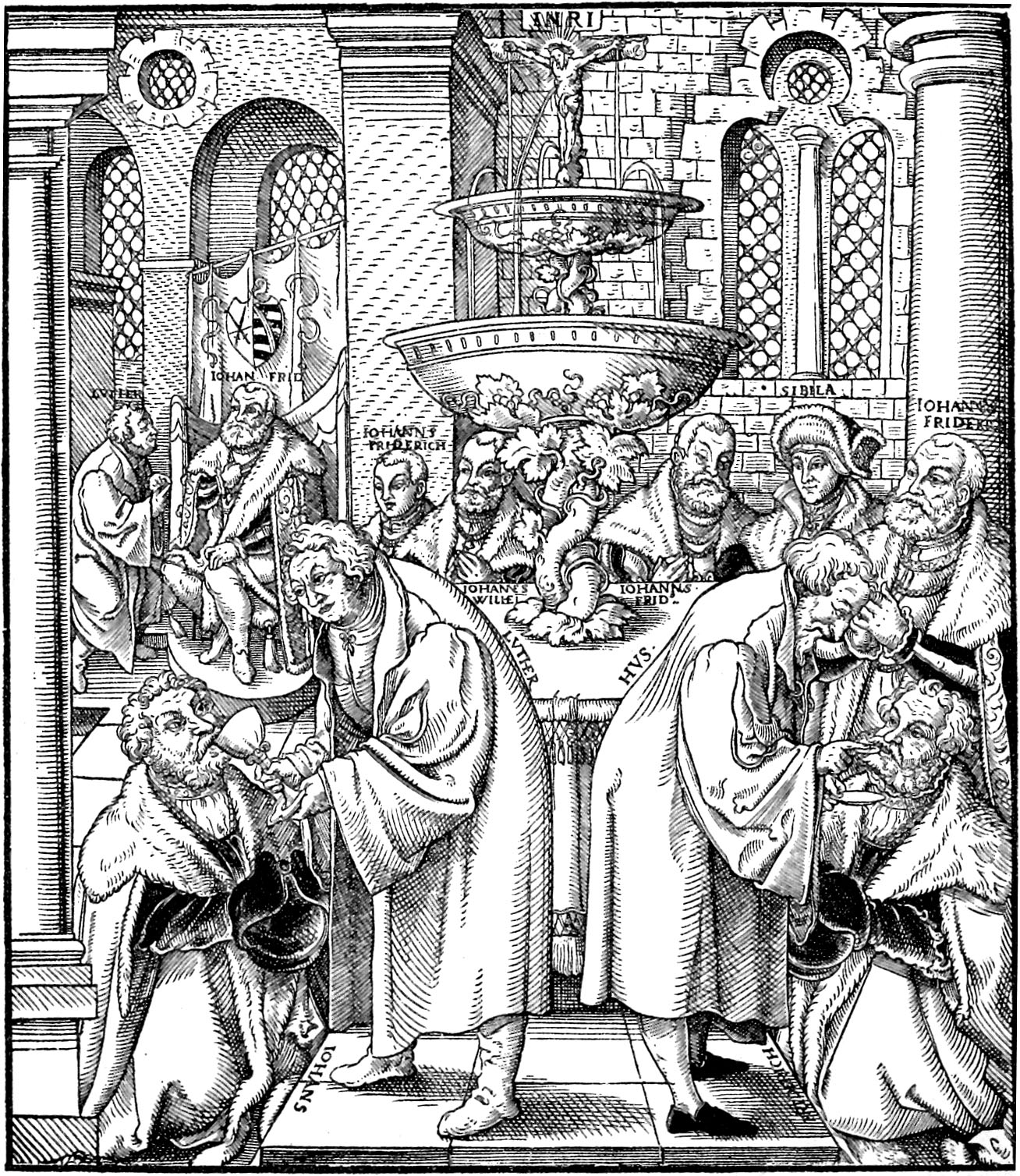
Allegoric representation of Sacramental union, the Lutheran doctrine of Real presence of Christ in the Eucharist, after a woodcut by Lucas Cranach the Elder (ca. 1550). In the front Communion under both kinds is pictured with (on the left) Martin Luther giving the chalice to John, Elector of Saxony and on the right Jan Hus giving the eucharistic bread to Frederick III, Elector of Saxony (Frederick the Wise). In the back a Fountain of Living Water: The blood of Christ's Five Holy Wounds spills in a fountain on the altar.

In a miniature in a Book of Hours, probably painted at Ghent at the end of the 15th century, the Fountain of Living Water has given way to a fountain of blood, the Fountain of Life, in which the figure of Christ stands upon a Gothic pedestal at the center and fills the fountain from his wounds, though the aureole that surrounds him identifies him as the transfigured Christ and the location as Paradise.

== Blood from the Five Holy Wounds ==
In Flanders at the close of the Middle Ages an intense devotion to the Precious Blood of Christ gave rise to an iconographic tradition of the 15th and 16th centuries, which rendered the theological concept of Grace, expressing Roman Catholic dogma allegorically as a fountain of blood. This transformation was first addressed in Evelyn Underhill in 1910, taking her point of departure an Assembly of Saints and the Fountain of Life of 1596 in Ghent, in which blood from the five Holy Wounds of Christ flows into the upper basin of a "Fountain of Life" and streams out through openings in the lower "Fountain of Mercy". Saints and martyrs, patriarchs and prophets hold golden chalices of blood, which some empty into the fountain. Below the faithful hold out their hearts to receive droplets of blood.

== In legend ==
The symbolic Fountain of Life is connected to ancient traditions of life-giving waters. A very early example is the Mesopotamian hero Gilgamesh's search for immortality in The Epic of Gilgamesh. Around the 4th century, legends of a quest for the Water of Life became attached to Alexander the Great. The story appears in Recension Beta (β) of the Greek Alexander Romance, a fantastical narrative of the conqueror written between 300 and 550 AD.

The story depicts Alexander's servant Andreas discovering the Water of Life while washing a salted fish, which then comes to life. The episode proved very popular, appearing in many later versions of the Alexander cycle, including the Babylonian Talmud and the Syriac Song of Alexander. The Song of Alexander draws more heavily on Christian iconography than earlier versions, employing baptismal terminology to describe bathing in the fountain and using the fish as a symbol of the resurrection of Jesus. The Romance's tale of Alexander's quest for the Water of Life influenced many later traditions, including the legends of Prester John, The Travels of Sir John Mandeville, and the legend of Ponce de Leon seeking the fountain while discovering Florida, today the most best known version.

== See also ==
- Odinsaker
- Life-giving Spring, for Byzantine Marian iconography (mediatrix, mother of all graces)
- Church of St. Mary of the Spring (Istanbul), a 6th-century Eastern Orthodox sanctuary in Istanbul
- Zoodochos Pigi (disambiguation)
