= Kraskovsky =

Kraskovsky is a surname. Notable people with the surname include:

- Ippolit Kraskovsky (1845–1899), Russian writer
- Ivan Kraskovsky (1880–1955), Ukrainian-Belarusian politician
- Pavel Kraskovsky (born 1996), Russian ice hockey player

== See also ==
- Krasovsky (disambiguation)
