= Zoodochos =

Zoodochos is a Greek term meaning "life-receiving". It refers to an attribute of the tomb of Christ, known as the Zoodochos Taphos in the Eastern Orthodox Church. The tomb of Christ is considered a symbol of the Resurrection in Eastern Christianity. The title zoodochos is occasionally applied to the Theotokos since church tradition teaches that she received the Life of Christ in her womb. The Church of St. Mary of the Spring in Istanbul is named Zoödochos Pege ("Life-giving Spring") and is dedicated to the Virgin.

The shrine and monastery of Zoodochos Pigi in eastern Greece is named after the tomb of Jesus.

== Churches and Monasteries dedicated to Zoodochos ==
=== Church of Zoodochos Pigi, Dervenosalesi (Boeotia) ===
It is located near the village of Pyli in Boeotia. This Byzantine-era church was originally part of a monastery. The existing structure served as the narthex of the main church (katholikon), which was a cross-in-square domed building adorned with inlaid marble floors reminiscent of the nearby Hosios Loukas monastery. The katholikon collapsed around 1890, and the narthex was subsequently converted into the present church. Remnants of the monastery's walls and 13th-century baths are still visible today.

=== Monastery of Zoodochos Pigi, Poros ===
It is situated approximately 4 kilometers east of the Poros town; this monastery was founded in 1720 by Archbishop Iakovos II of Athens. According to tradition, the Archbishop was miraculously cured of lithiasis after drinking from a nearby spring, prompting the establishment of the monastery. Built within a pine forest, it remains a significant religious site on the island.

=== Monastery of Zoodochos Pigi, Balıklı (Istanbul) ===
This monastery is renowned for its sacred spring, believed to possess healing properties. The site has a rich history dating back to the Byzantine era and continues to be a place of pilgrimage.
