= Life-giving Spring =

Epithet of the Virgin Mary

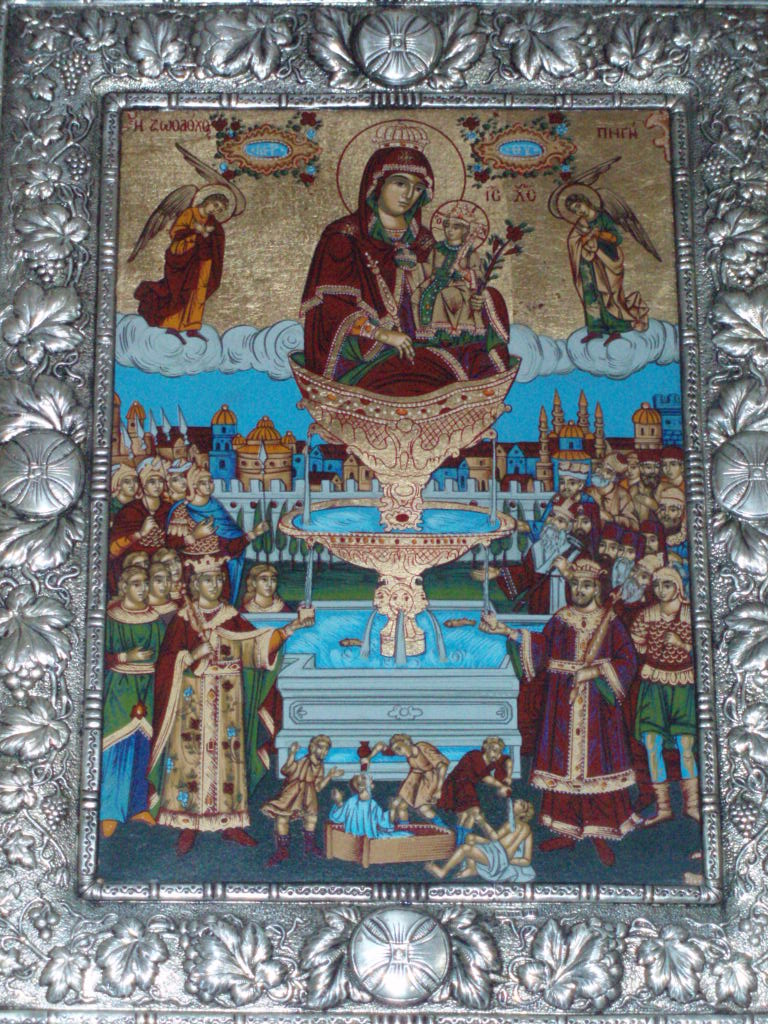
Greek icon of the Theotokos, Life-giving Spring

The Mother of God of the Life-giving Spring or Life-giving Font (Ancient Greek: Ζωοδόχος Πηγή, romanized: Zōodóchos Pēgḗ, modern pronunciation: [zo.oˈðoxos piˈʝi]; Russian: Живоно́сный Исто́чник, romanized: Zhivonósny Istóchnik, IPA: [ʐɨvɐˈnosnɨj ɪˈstotɕnʲɪk]) is an epithet of the Holy Theotokos that originated with her revelation of a sacred spring (Ancient Greek: ἁγίασμα, romanized: hagíasma) in Valoukli, Constantinople, to a soldier named Leo Marcellus, who later became Byzantine Emperor Leo I (457-474). (Note: Byzantine Emperor Leo I the Thracian was a pious man who is commemorated as a Saint in the Eastern Orthodox Church, with his feast day on January 20.) Leo built the historic Church of St. Mary of the Spring over this site, which witnessed numerous miraculous healings over the centuries, (Note: The so-called "habitual miracle" (to synetés thauma). Nikephoros Kallistos Xanthopoulos writing in the 14th century about the hagiasma, quoting from various sources, records a total of 63 miracles, of which 15 had occurred in his own time.) through her intercessions, becoming one of the most important pilgrimage sites in Greek Orthodoxy. Thus the term "Life-giving Font" became an epithet of the Holy Theotokos and she was represented as such in iconography.

The feast day of the Life-giving Spring is celebrated on Bright Friday in the Eastern Orthodox Church, (Note: Name days celebrated today include: Zoe, Zoey - (Ancient Greek: Ζωή, romanized: Zōḗ, Ζώης, Zṓēs, Ζωΐτσα, Zōḯtsa, Ζωούλα, Zōoúla, Ζωζώ, Zōzṓ.); Peggy - (Ancient Greek: Πηγή, romanized: Pēgḗ, lit. 'wellspring').) and in those Eastern Catholic Churches which follow the Byzantine Rite. Additionally, the icon of the Theotokos the "Life-giving Spring" is commemorated on April 4 / 17 in Slavic Orthodox churches.

== Legend ==
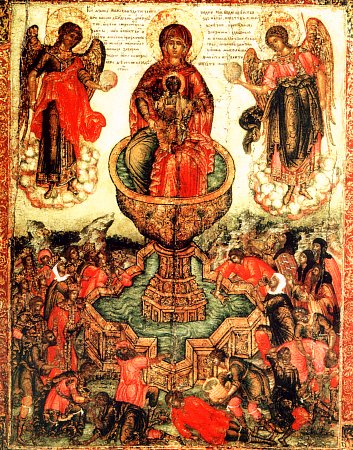
Russian icon of the Theotokos, Life-giving Spring, 17th century

Outside the Imperial City of Constantinople, near the Golden Gate (Porta Aurea) used to be found a grove of trees. A shrine was located there with a spring of water, which from early times had been dedicated to the Theotokos. Over time, the grove had become overgrown and the spring became fetid.

The traditional account surrounding the feast of the Life-Giving Spring is recorded by Nikephoros Kallistos Xanthopoulos, the last of the Greek ecclesiastical historians, who flourished around 1320. It begins with a miracle that occurred involving a soldier named Leo Marcellus, the future Byzantine Emperor Leo I. On April 4, 450, as Leo was passing by the grove, he came across a blind man who had become lost. Leo took pity on him, led him to the pathway, seated him in the shade and began to search for water to give the thirsty man. Leo heard a voice say to him, "Do not trouble yourself, Leo, to look for water elsewhere, it is right here!" Looking about, he could see no one, and neither could he see any water. Then he heard the voice again,

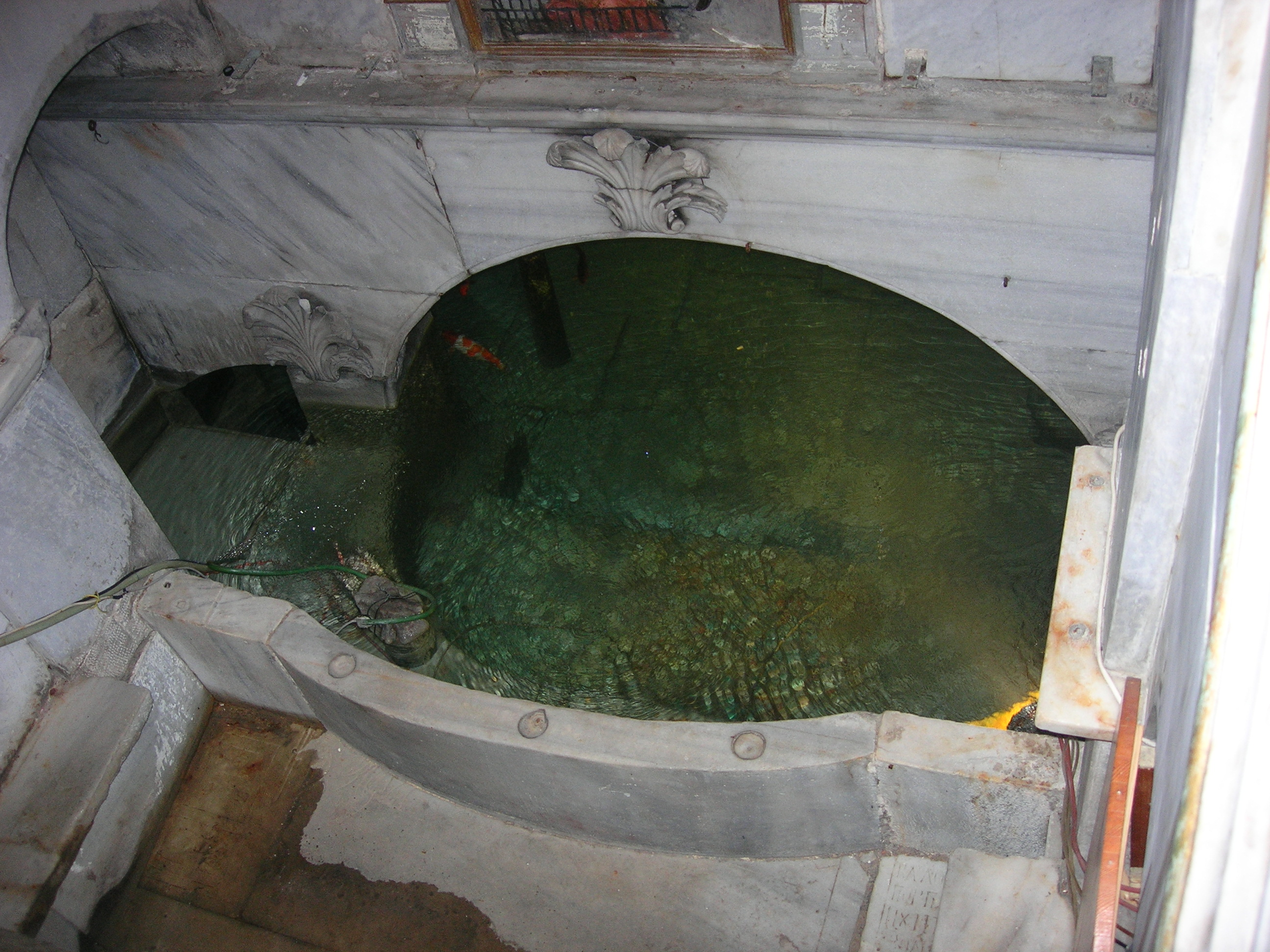
The Holy well (hagíasma) of the Church of the Life Giving Font (Istanbul)

"Leo, Emperor, go into the grove, take the water which you will find and give it to the thirsty man. Then take the mud [from the stream] and put it on the blind man's eyes.... And build a temple [church] here ... that all who come here will find answers to their petitions."

Leo did as he was told, and when the blind man's eyes were anointed he regained his sight.

After his accession to the throne, the Emperor erected a magnificent church on this site, dedicated to the Theotokos, and the water continued to work miraculous cures, as well as resurrections from the dead, through the intercession of the Theotokos, and therefore it was called "The Life-Giving Spring."

== Church ==
Historians Procopius and Cedrenus state that Emperor Justinian erected a new church, larger than the first, in the last years of his reign (559–560), utilizing materials that had remained after the erection of the Hagia Sophia. After the erection of the sanctuary, the Byzantines named the Gate that was situated outside the walls of Theodosius II "Gate of the Spring" (Ancient Greek: Πύλη τῆς Πηγῆς, romanized: Pýlē tês Pēgês).

After the Fall of Constantinople in 1453, the church was torn down by the Turks, and the stones used to build a mosque of Sultan Bayezid. Only a small chapel remained at the site of the church. Twenty-five steps led down to the site of the spring, surrounded by a railing. In 1547 the French humanist Petrus Gyllius noted that the church no longer existed, but that ailing people continued to visit the spring of holy water.

As a result of the Greek War of Independence of 1821, even the little chapel was destroyed and the spring was left buried under the rubble.

In 1833 the reforming Ottoman Sultan Mahmud II gave permission for the Christians to rebuild the church. When the foundations of the original church were discovered during the course of construction, the Sultan issued a second firman permitting not only the reconstruction of the small chapel, but of a large church according to the original dimensions. Construction was completed on December 30, 1834, and the Ecumenical Patriarch, Constantius II, consecrated the church on February 2, 1835, celebrating with 12 bishops and an enormous crowd of the faithful.

On September 6, 1955, during the anti-Greek Istanbul Pogrom, the church was one of the targets of the fanatic mob. The building was burned to the ground while the abbot was lynched, and 90-year-old Archimandrite Chrisanthos Mantas was assassinated by the mob.

Another small chapel has been rebuilt on the site, but the church has not yet been restored to its former size. The spring still flows today and is considered by the faithful to have wonderworking properties.

== Feast day ==
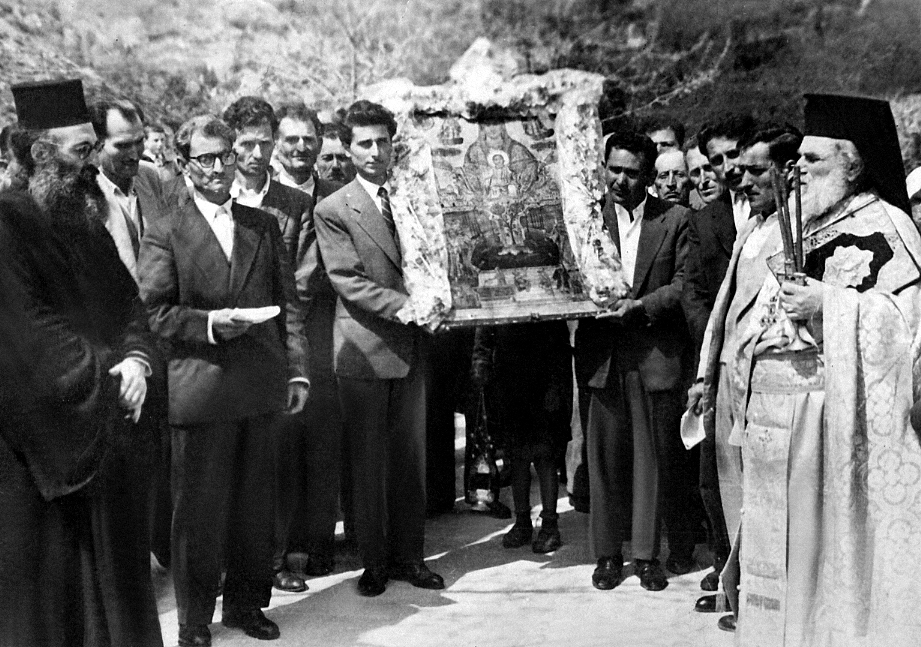
Procession on the feast day of the Life-giving Spring, Bright Friday 1959, Arcadia, Greece

The feast day is observed on Bright Friday, that is, the Friday following Pascha (Easter). It is the only feast day which may be celebrated during Bright Week, as all other commemorations which happen to fall during this time are usually transferred to another day. The propers (hymns and prayers) of the feast are combined with the Paschal hymns, and there is often a Lesser Blessing of Waters performed after the Divine Liturgy on Bright Friday.

There is also a commemoration of the Icon of the Theotokos the Life-giving Spring observed on April 4 (Julian Calendar) / April 17 (Gregorian Calendar).

This type of icon spread throughout the Orthodox world, particularly in places where a spring was believed to be sacred.

In old Russia, continuing Greek traditions, there was a custom to sanctify springs that were located near churches, dedicate them to the Holy Mother, and paint icons of her under the title The Life Giving Spring.

A similar revelation of the Theotokos occurred in Estonia in the 16th century. The Pühtitsa Convent is located on a site where, according to a 16th-century legend, near the local village of Kuremäe, a shepherd witnessed a divine revelation of the Theotokos near a spring of water that is to this day venerated as holy and is famous for many miracles and healings. The icon, which was painted much later, is known as the Pühtitsa icon of the Mother of God "To the spring" (Russian: Пю́хтицкая ико́на Бо́жией Ма́тери «У исто́чника», romanized: Pyúkhtitskaya ikóna Bózhiyey Máteri “U istóchnika”).

== Hymns ==
In the 9th century, Joseph the Hymnographer gave the title 'Life-giving Spring' (Zōodóchos Pēgḗ) to a hymn (Theotokíon) for the Mother of God for the first time.

Apolytikion (Tone 3)

As a life-giving fount, thou didst conceive the Dew that is transcendent in essence,
O Virgin Maid, and thou hast welled forth for our sakes the nectar of joy eternal,
which doth pour forth from thy fount with the water that springeth up
unto everlasting life in unending and mighty streams;
wherein, taking delight, we all cry out:
Rejoice, O thou Spring of life for all men.

Kontakion (Plagal of Tone 4)

O Lady graced by God,
you reward me by letting gush forth, beyond reason,
the ever-flowing waters of your grace from your perpetual Spring.
I entreat you, who bore the Logos, in a manner beyond comprehension,
to refresh me in your grace that I may cry out,
“Hail redemptive waters.”

== See also ==
- Church of St. Mary of the Spring (Istanbul)
- Holy well
- Holy water
- Shrines to the Virgin Mary
- Fountain of Life (iconography)
- Theotokos
- Icon of the Hodegetria
- Madonna (art)
- Pühtitsa Convent
- Zoodochos Pigi
