= Krasovsky =

Krasovsky (Russian: Красовский; Ukrainian: Красовський) may refer to:

- Krasovsky ellipsoid
- Krasovskii–LaSalle principle
- Krasovskiy (crater)

== People with the surname ==
- Anton Krasovsky (born 1975), Russian journalist, television personality and propagandist
- Feodosy Krasovsky (1878–1948), Russian/Soviet astronomer and geodesist
- Mykola Krasovsky (1871-1930s), Ukrainian police detective and intelligence officer
- Nikolay Krasovsky (1924–2012), Russian mathematician who worked in the mathematical theory of control, the theory of dynamical systems and the theory of differential games
- Oleksiy Krasovsky (born 1994), Ukrainian cross-country skier
- Vasili Krasovsky (1782–1824), Russian writer
- Roman (Krassovsky) (born 1959), Archimandrite of the Russian Orthodox Church Outside Russia and chief of the Russian Ecclesiastical Mission in Jerusalem
- Vladimir Krassovsky (born 1950), choir director of Holy Virgin Cathedral in San Francisco
