= Uncle Vova =

Uncle Vova (Russian: Дядя Вова, romanized: Dyadya Vova) may refer to:

- A polite form of address to an adult named Vova, in addition to its literal meaning
- A reference to Vladimir Putin popularized among Russian nationalists after the song Uncle Vova, we are with you!
- Fictional character in 1986 dystopian science fiction comedy film Kin-dza-dza!
- Alias of Vladimir Krassovsky
