= Easter Tuesday =

Third day of Easter

- Observed by: Christendom
- Type: Christian
- Observances: church services
- Date: third day of Eastertide
- 2025 date: April 22 (Western); April 22 (Eastern)
- 2026 date: April 7 (Western); April 14 (Eastern)
- 2027 date: March 30 (Western); May 4 (Eastern)
- 2028 date: April 18 (Western); April 18 (Eastern)

Easter Tuesday is the third day of Eastertide and is a holiday in some areas. Easter Tuesday in the Western Christian liturgical calendar is the third day in the Octave of Easter and analogously, in the Byzantine Rite, is the third day of Bright Week.

== Liturgical observances ==
=== Western Christianity ===
In Western Christianity, Easter Tuesday is the third day of Eastertide, as well as the third day in the Octave of Easter.

In the Lutheran Churches, the Gospel for Easter Tuesday concerns St. Luke's account of Jesus' disciples in the Upper Room.

In Western Christianity, since Easter is between 22 March and 25 April, Easter Tuesday can be between 24 March and 27 April respectively.

== Cultural observances ==
=== Australia and New Zealand ===
Easter Tuesday is a normal working day in all Australian states and territories except Tasmania, where it is a legal holiday for certain workers, generally the Public Service. Historically, when the Australian academic year was divided into three terms, Easter Tuesday was an extension of the Easter break within Term 1 in Sydney to allow children to attend the Sydney Royal Easter Show. Under the current four-term system, it is common for Easter Tuesday to fall within the regular school holidays at the end of Term 1.

Easter Tuesday is not a public holiday in New Zealand, but in the public education sector it is a mandatory holiday. Easter Tuesday was a public holiday in Australia and New Zealand in 2000 by happenstance as it coincided with ANZAC Day, and in 2011 as a substitute holiday as Easter Monday and ANZAC Day coincided.

=== Great Britain ===
Although Easter Tuesday is not a holiday in Great Britain, a proposal for a five-term academic year with fixed term lengths would see Easter Tuesday become a school holiday as an extension to the Easter weekend (a mini-break within the fourth term).

=== Northern Ireland ===
In Northern Ireland Easter Tuesday is not an official government and public bank holiday. However, public transport operates a holiday timetable on this day.

=== Republic of Cyprus ===
In Cyprus, Easter Tuesday is an official bank holiday.

== See also ==
- Bright Week
- Easter Monday
- Easter Friday
- Easter Saturday
- Good Friday
- Life of Jesus in the New Testament
- Sham El Nessim
