= Zoodochos Pigi =

Zoodochos Pigi (Ζωοδόχος Πηγή), Greek for Life-giving Spring, may refer to:

== Places ==
- a village in the town Didymoteicho, Evros, Greece
- Zoodochos Pigi, Larissa, a settlement in the Larissa regional unit
- Zoodochos Pigi, Naxos, a village on the island of Naxos
- an islet in the Alkyonides Gulf

== Churches ==
- Church of St. Mary of the Spring (Istanbul)
- Zoodochos Pigi Church, Dervenosalesi, Greece
- Church of the Life-giving Spring (Athens)
- Church of Zoodochos Pigi, Paros, Greece
- Zoodochos Pigi Monastery, Poros, Greece
