= Roman (Krassovsky) =

Russian Orthodox archimandrite

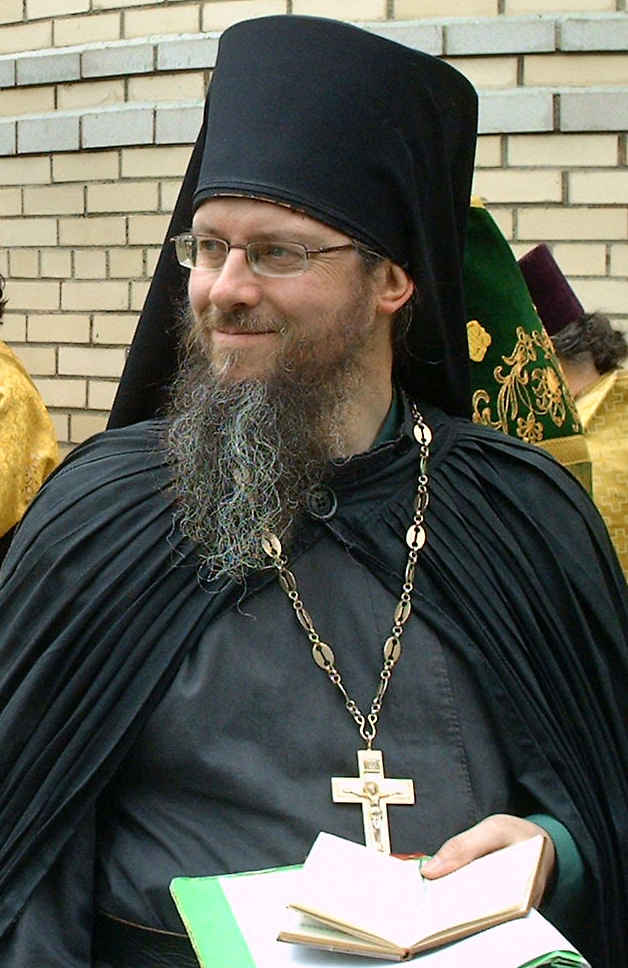
- Native name: Роман
- Church: Russian Orthodox Church Outside Russia
- See: Russian Orthodox Ecclesiastical Mission in Jerusalem
- Appointed: 14 June 2012
- Predecessor: Tikhon Amelchenya

Orders
- Ordination: 1992; 17 July 1993; 6 May 1994; by Laurus Škurla

Personal details
- Born: Michael Vadimovich Krassovsky; 1959 (age 66–67) San Mateo, California, United States

Archimandrite Roman (secular name Michael Vadimovich Krassovsky, Russian: Михаил Вадимович Красовский; born 1959) is Archimandrite of the Russian Orthodox Church Outside Russia and current chief of the ROCOR Russian Ecclesiastical Mission in Jerusalem.

== Biography ==
He was born in 1959 in San Mateo, California. He was the youngest of four sons to Larissa and Vadim Krassovsky. His elder brothers named Vladimir, Eugene and Alexander. His parents were close to Archbishop John of Shanghai and San Francisco, who blessed their marriage in refugee camp in Tubabao and was a frequent guest at their house in Burlingame, California.

On the eve of the Praise of the Mother of God in 1992, Michael Krassovsky was tonsured a monk by Archbishop Laurus Škurla of Syracuse and Holy Trinity, and given the name Roman, in honor of Saint Roman the Melodist. On 17 July 1993 by same bishop Monk Roman was ordained to the rank of hierodeacon. On 6 May 1994, on Bright Friday, by same bishop he was ordained to the rank of hieromonk.

During the 11 February 2005 Small Entrance at the Liturgy, Metropolitan Laurus (Škurla) awarded Hieromonk Roman (Krassovsky) the right to wear the Golden Cross in recognition of his many labors, which include heading the Holy Trinity Seminary and Monastery choir and teaching church music in Seminary.

In May 2007, he visited Russia part of a clergymen-pilgrims from different dioceses of ROCOR to ceremony of the signing of the Act of Canonical Communion.

On 14 June 2012, the Synod of Bishops of the Russian Orthodox Church Outside of Russia appointed Hieromonk Roman (Krassovsky) as Acting Chief of the Russian Ecclesiastical Mission in Jerusalem (deputy of the sick Archimandrite Tikhon (Amelchenya)). On 9 October 2012 Synod of Bishops of ROCOR relieved Archimandrite Tikhon (Amelchenya) of his duties as Chief of ROCOR Russian Ecclesiastical Mission in Jerusalem. Hieromonk Roman appointed Acting Chief of the REM. On 8 November 2012, Roman accompanied Archbishop Mark (Arndt) of Berlin and Germany, Overseer of the REM, arrived to Jerusalem. Archbishop Mark introduced Roman to Patriarch Theophilos III of Jerusalem, who blessed Roman's new obedience.

The Synod of Bishops of the Russian Orthodox Church Outside of Russia has confirmed Fr Roman as the Chief of the Russian Ecclesiastical Mission in Jerusalem and on 20 April 2013, Akathistos Saturday, Archbishop Mark of Berlin and Germany elevated Hieromonk Roman (Krassovsky) to the rank of hegumen in the Holy Ascension Convent on the Mount of Olives.

On 21 April, the Fifth Sunday of Great Lent, Archbishop Mark officiated at Divine Liturgy at St Mary Magdalene Convent in Gethsemane; and During the minor entrance he elevated Fr. Roman to the rank of archimandrite. Archbishop Mark then congratulated Fr. Roman and gave him an abbot's staff.
