= Octave of Easter =

Western Christianity celebration

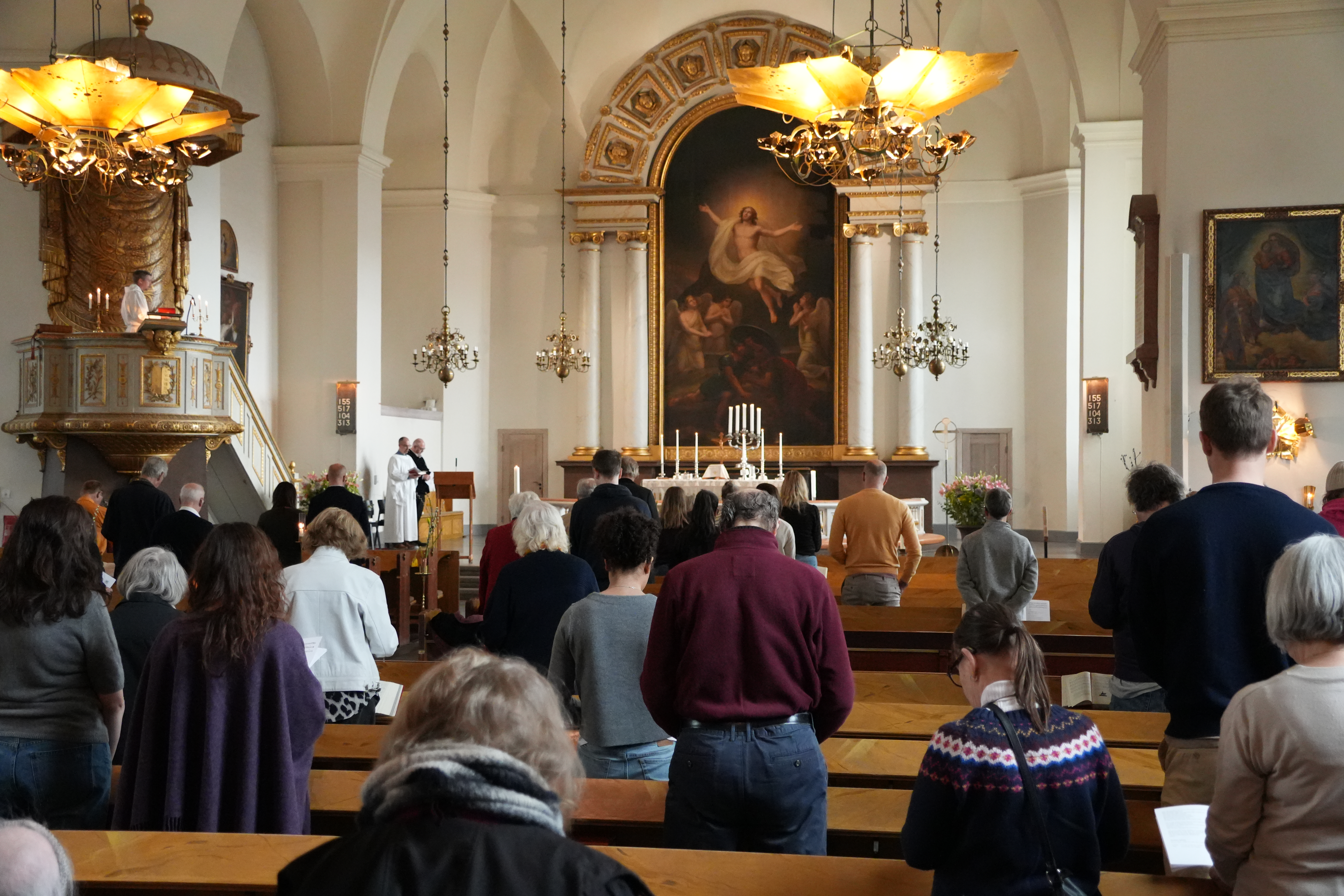
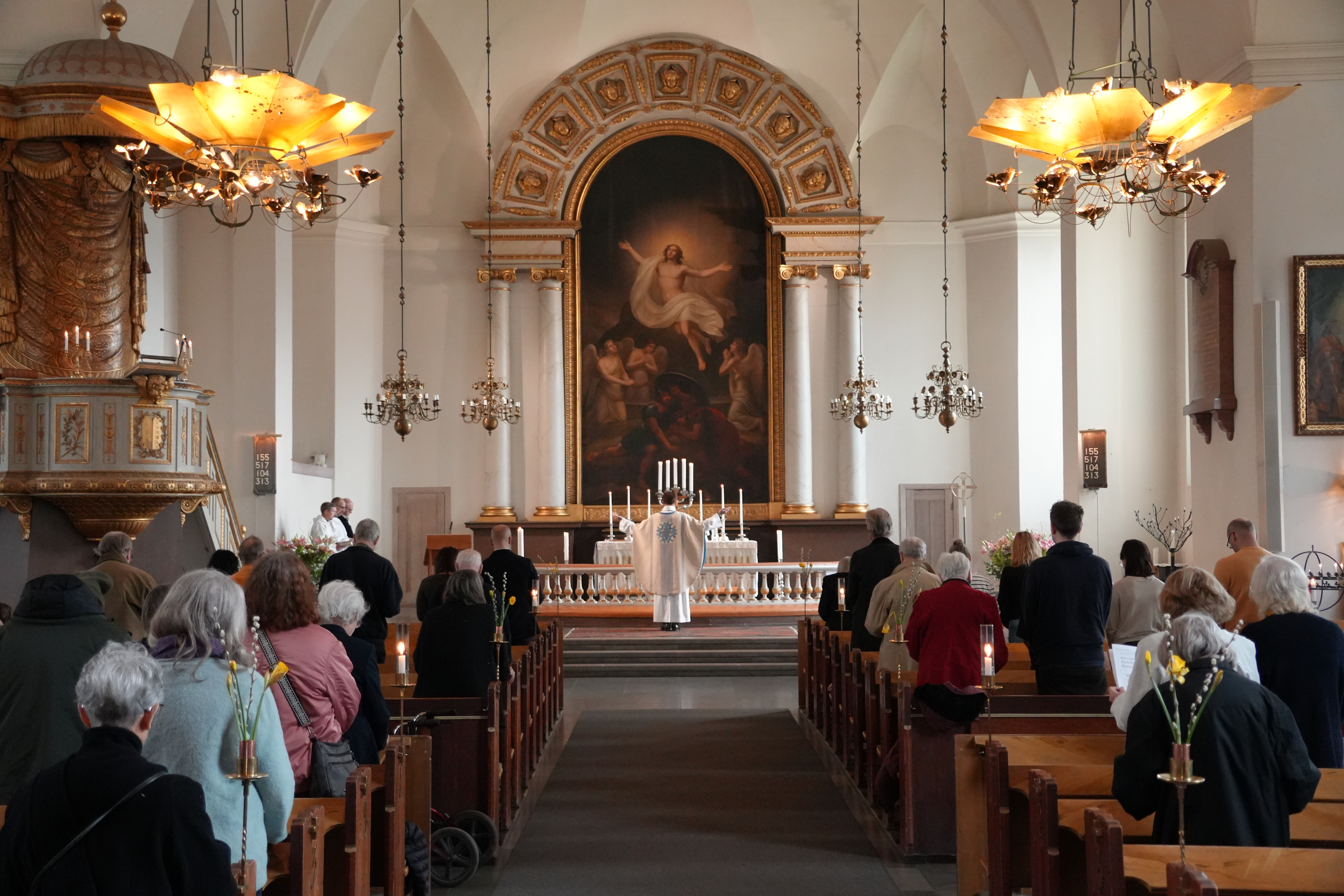
The celebration of Easter Monday Mass by Evangelical-Lutheran priests at Kungsholm Church, part of the Diocese of Stockholm in the Church of Sweden.

The Octave of Easter is the eight-day period, or octave, that begins on Easter Sunday and ends with Second Sunday of Easter. It marks the beginning of Eastertide. The first seven of these eight days are also collectively known as Easter Week.

== Days in the octave ==
1. Easter Sunday
2. Easter Monday
3. Easter Tuesday
4. Easter Wednesday
5. Easter Thursday
6. Easter Friday
7. Easter Saturday
8. Second Sunday of Easter

== Liturgical celebration ==
=== Roman Rite ===
In the Ordinary Form of the Roman Rite, Easter is one of two solemnities with octaves; the other is Christmas. The days of the octave are given the second-highest rank in the calendar (second only to the Paschal Triduum and Easter itself), ranking even above normal solemnities. The paschal sequence Victimæ paschali laudes may be sung before the gospel reading on each of these days.

The Gospel readings for each of middle days within the octave are taken from the various Scriptural accounts of the Resurrection of Jesus.

- Monday: Matthew 28:8–15
- Tuesday: John 20:11–18
- Wednesday: Luke 24:13–35
- Thursday: Luke 24:35–48
- Friday: John 21:1–14
- Saturday: Mark 16:9–15

=== Lutheran ===
The Octave of Easter is celebrated with daily Mass. The Lutheran Missal states:

The Octave of Easter forms a cohesive thematic unit with the two following weeks. The Gospel for Quasimodogeniti, the First Sunday after Easter, recounts the appearance of Our Lord to the apostles in the locked upper room, together with Thomas’ confession.
