= Ippolit Kraskovsky =

Russian author

- Native name: Ипполит Феофилович Красковский
- Born: 1845 Grodno Governorate, Vilna Governorate-General, Russian Empire
- Died: 14 January [O.S. 2 January] 1899 Moscow, Russian Empire
- Language: Russian
- Education: Saint Petersburg Theological Academy

Ippolit Feofilovich Kraskovsky (Russian: Ипполи́т Феофи́лович Краско́вский; 9 December 1845 - 14 January [O.S. 2 January] 1899) was a Russian writer. He attended the Saint Petersburg Theological Academy, having moved to Moscow in the 1860s, and wrote short stories for the Moskovskiye Vedomosti newspaper in the 1860s. He later spent roughly a year in Mount Athos, after which he wrote a book entitled Macarius of Athos.
