= Nikephoros Kallistos Xanthopoulos =

Byzantine ecclesiastical historian (c. 1256 – c. 1335)

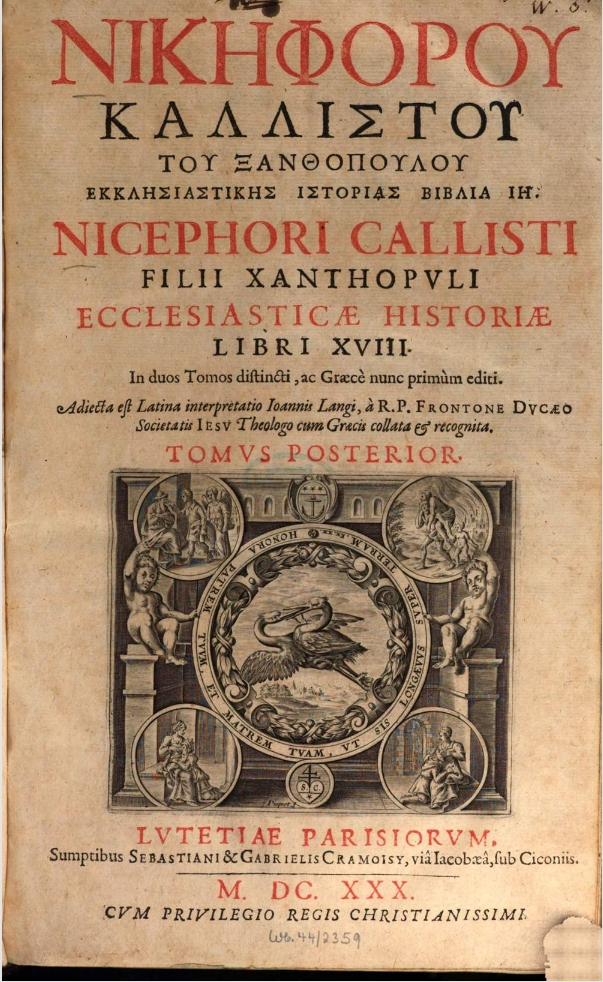
A Greek and Latin copy of Xanthopoulos' Ecclesiastica Historia ("Church History"); published in 1630.

Nikephoros Kallistos Xanthopoulos (Greek: Νικηφόρος Κάλλιστος Ξανθόπουλος; Latinized as Nicephorus Callistus Xanthopulus; c. 1256 – 1335) was a Greek ecclesiastical historian and litterateur of the late Byzantine Empire. His most popular work, the voluminous Ecclesiastica historia, constitutes a significant documentary source on primitive Christianity and its doctrinal controversies, as well as for hagiographical, liturgical, and legendary texts from Byzantine culture.

== Life ==
Most of our knowledge of Xanthopoulos' biography comes from the opening of his ecclesiastical history. The preface says that he began working on his history at age thirty-six. Nicephorus was trained in the florid, rhetorical style of Renaissance Byzantine historiography. He became a priest at Hagia Sophia and thus gained access to the patriarchal library. He also gave lessons in rhetoric and theology for which he prepared many new progymnasmata (exercises). Xanthopoulos was a friend of Theodoros Metochites, who dedicated his Poem 12 to him. During his later years it is possible that he became a monk.

== Works ==
=== Ecclesiastica Historia ===
Xanthopoulos' 23-volume Ecclesiastica Historia (Greek: Εκκλησιαστική Ιστορία; "Church History"), of which only the first eighteen volumes are known, starts the historical narrative from the time of Christ and continues until the execution of the emperor Phokas in 610. The work includes descriptions of secular events, such as the accession of emperors and military campaigns, but emphasizes ecumenical councils, doctrinal disputes, and the four eastern patriarchates.

Xanthopoulos began his project around 1310 using the basilica's manuscript library, and he completed it sometime after 1317. For the first four centuries, the author is largely dependent on his predecessors, Eusebius, Socrates Scholasticus, Sozomen, Theodoret and Evagrius, his additions showing very little critical faculty.p Also relied heavily on a collection of church histories in the Baroccianus Graecus 142, which contains the histories of Sozomen, Evagrios, and a variety of other excerpts on church history. Among the comments and notes that were added by Xanthopoulos, the book contains the phrase Κύριε βοήθει τῶ δούλω Νικοφόρω Καλλίστω ("Lord help your slave Nikephoros Kallistos"), which served as both a prayer and a signature. The work was dedicated to the emperor Andronicus II Palaeologus and it contributed to the monarch's nationalist movement exalting Greek culture and Orthodoxy above Latin Christianity. His later work, which is based upon documents now no longer extant, is much more valuable.

A table of contents of another five books, continuing the history to the death of Leo VI the Wise in 911, also exists, but whether the books were ever actually written is doubtful. Some modern scholars think that Nicephorus appropriated and passed off as his own the work of an unknown author of the 10th century. The plan of the work is good and, in spite of its fables and superstitious absurdities, contains important facts which would otherwise have been unknown.

Only one manuscript of the history is known. It was stolen by a Turkish soldier from the library at Buda during the reign of Matthias Corvinus of Hungary and taken to Constantinople, where it was bought by a Christian and eventually reached the imperial library in Vienna.

The Greek text was first printed by Fronton de Duc in 1630. This edition was reprinted by Migne in his Patrologia Graeca, vols.145-7. The Austrian Academy of Sciences commissioned a new edition in 2022, of which one volume has already (2026) appeared.

=== Other ===
Among Xanthopoulos' other works are commentaries on the writings of the patristic Greek theologian Gregory of Nazianzus and of the Byzantine monk John Climacus. He was also the author of lists of the emperors and patriarchs of Constantinople, of a poem on the capture of Jerusalem, and of a synopsis of the Scriptures, all in iambics; and of commentaries on liturgical poems. As a hagiographer, his writings include a history of miracles that occurred at the shrine of Zoödochos Pege, as well as the lives of Saint Nicholas of Myra and Euphrosyne the Younger. He also wrote many of the synaxaria in use in the Eastern Orthodox Church.
