= Easter Friday =

First Friday after Easter in Christianity

- Observed by: Christendom
- Type: Christian
- Observances: church services
- Date: sixth day of Eastertide
- 2025 date: April 25 (Western); April 25 (Eastern)
- 2026 date: April 10 (Western); April 17 (Eastern)
- 2027 date: April 2 (Western); May 7 (Eastern)
- 2028 date: April 21 (Western); April 21 (Eastern)

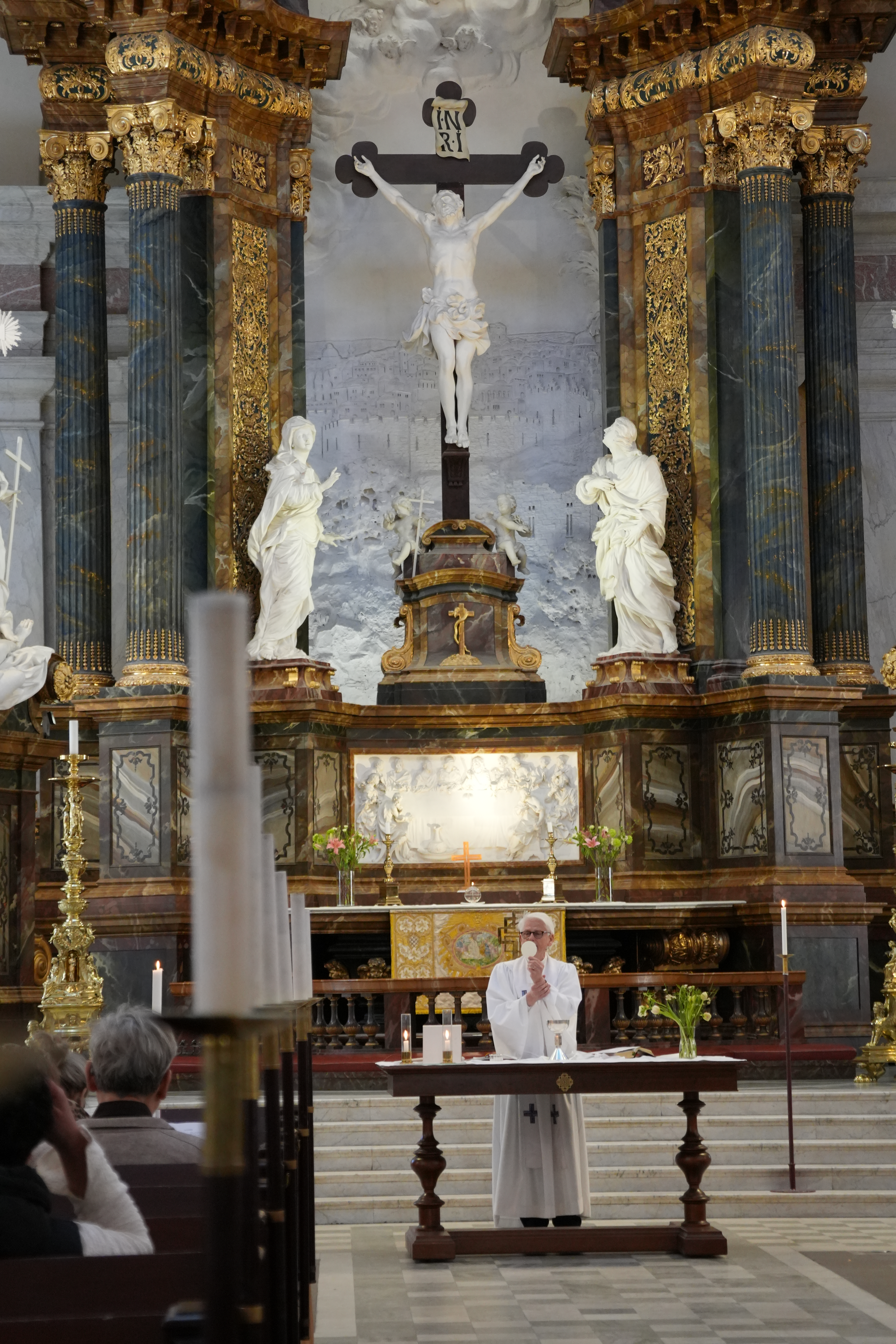
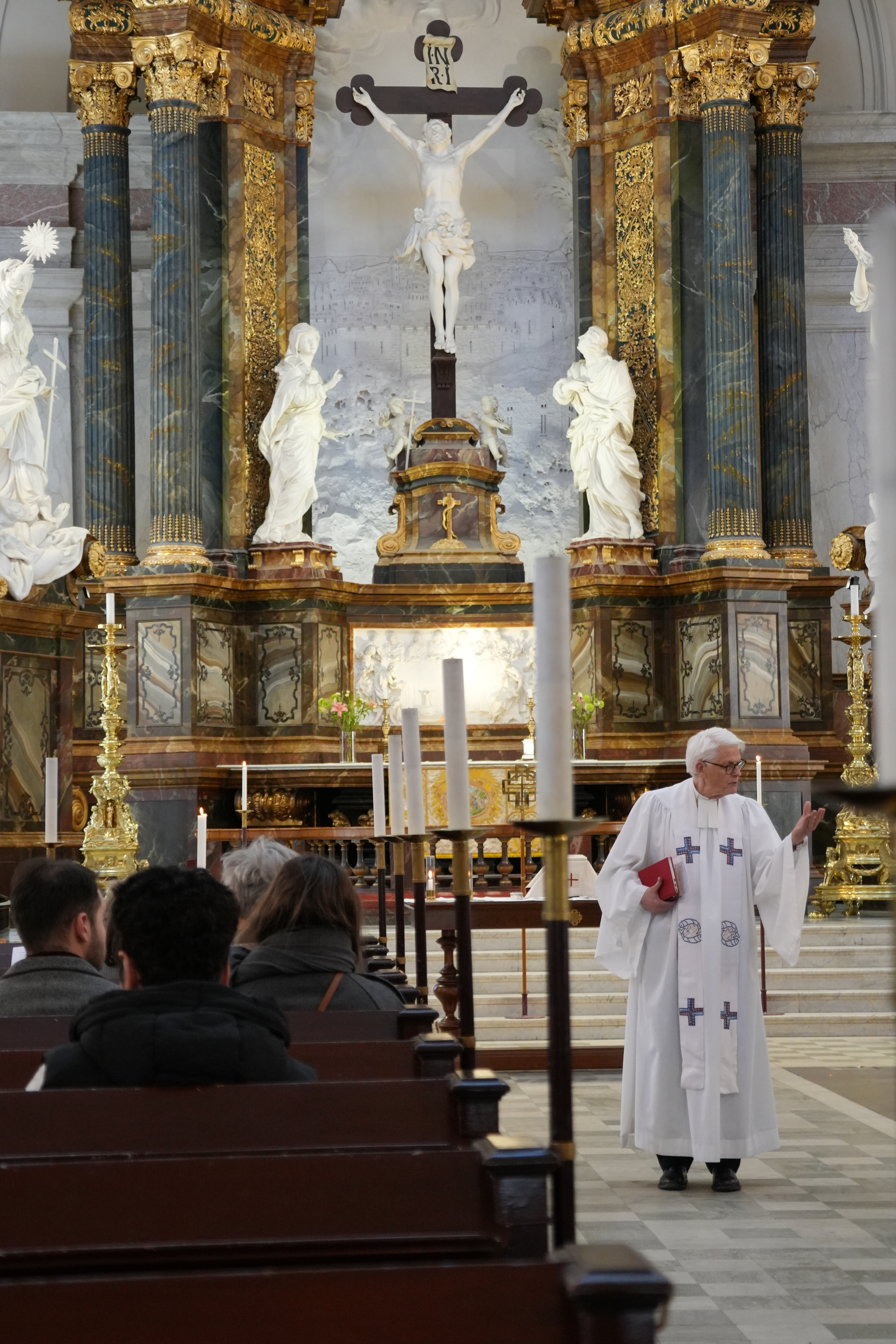
The celebration of Easter Friday Mass at Gustaf Vasa Evangelical-Lutheran Church, part of the Diocese of Stockholm in the Church of Sweden.

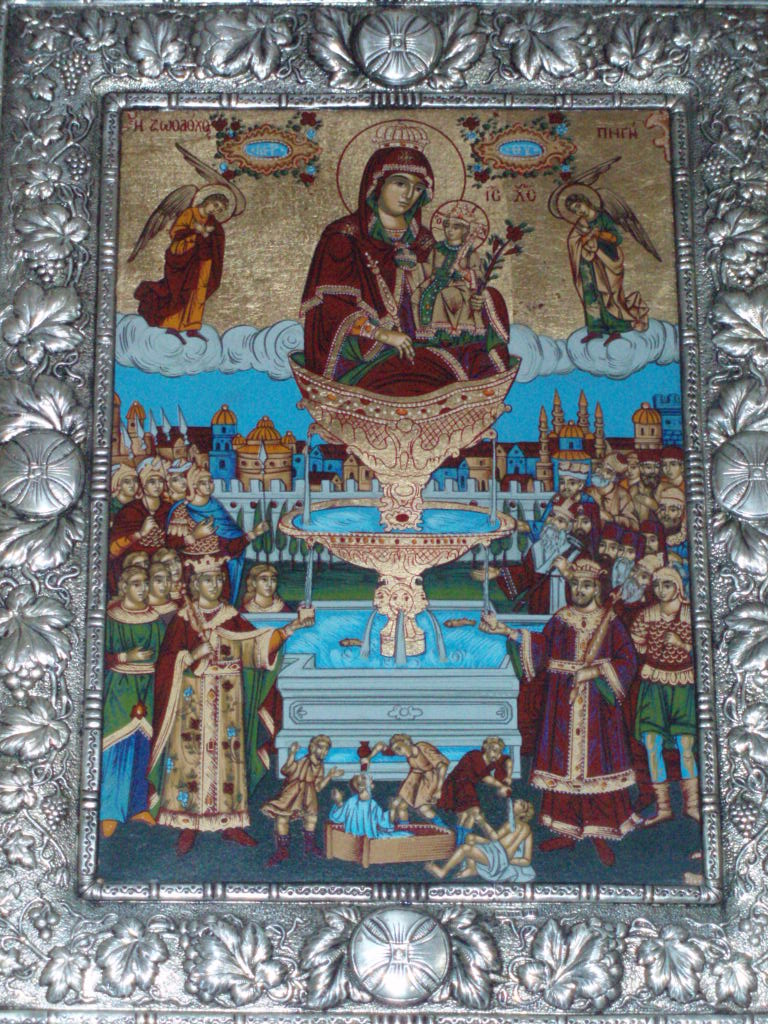
Greek icon of the Theotokos, The Life-giving Fount, commemorated on Bright Friday

Easter Friday, or Bright Friday, is the sixth day in the Christian season of Eastertide. At times, this name has been confused with Good Friday, which falls a week earlier.

Since the date of Easter is calculated differently by Eastern and Western Christians, the date of the Western Churches' Easter Friday is often different from the Eastern Bright Friday. In Western Christianity, Easter Friday is also the sixth day of the Octave of Easter.

== Western Christianity ==
In the Roman Catholic Church, Lutheran Churches and some Anglican Churches, Easter Friday falls within the Octave of Easter. The date of Easter Friday changes from year to year, following the changing date of Easter Week. Since Easter Sunday falls between March 22 and April 25, it follows that Easter Friday falls between March 27 and April 30. Occurrence in March is relatively uncommon, with the most recent occurrence having been March 28, 2008 and the next occurrence to be March 30, 2035.

The dates for the current decade are as follows:

- 2020: April 17
- 2021: April 9
- 2022: April 22
- 2023: April 14
- 2024: April 5
- 2025: April 25
- 2026: April 10
- 2027: April 2
- 2028: April 21
- 2029: April 6

== Eastern Christianity ==
In the Eastern Orthodox Church and the Eastern Catholic Churches which follow the Byzantine Rite, this day is referred to as "Bright Friday". All of the services for Pascha (Easter) are repeated every day of Bright Week (Easter Week), except for the hymns from the Octoechos. On Bright Friday, the Resurrection hymns from the Octoechos are taken from Tone Six.

In addition to the Paschal hymns, propers in honour of the Theotokos (Virgin Mary) as the "Life-giving Spring" are chanted on Bright Friday, and there is customarily a Lesser Blessing of Waters.

Because the date of Pascha is movable, Bright Friday is a part of the Paschal cycle, and changes from year to year. Eastern Christianity calculates the date of Easter differently from the West (see Computus for details). In 2019 it fell on May 3 (April 20 Old Style), in 2020 it fell on April 24 (April 11) and in 2021 it fell on May 7 (April 24).

== See also ==
- Easter Week
- Easter Monday
- Easter Tuesday
- Easter Saturday
