= Vladimir Krassovsky =

Vladimir Krassovsky Владимир Красовский
- Also known as: Дя́дя Во́ва (Dyadya Vova, Uncle Vova), Vova, Vova Krassovsky
- Born: Vladimir Vadimovich Krassovsky; 22 November 1950 (age 75); Bangkok, Thailand
- Genres: Church music
- Occupation(s): Choir director, singer, iconographer
- Instrument: Piano
- Years active: 1969–present

Vladimir Vadimovich Krassovsky (Russian: Влади́мир Вади́мович Красо́вский; born 22 November 1950, Bangkok) is the choir director of the Holy Virgin Cathedral. He is the elder brother of Archimandrite Roman (Krassovsky). He is a member of the Church and Music Commission of the Russian Orthodox Church Outside of Russia.

== Biography ==
Vladimir Krassovsky was born on 22 November 1950 in Bangkok to the emigrants from Russia, Vadim and Larisa Krassovsky.

In the mid-1950s, his family moved to live in the United States, California. In parallel with an American school, he attended the parish gymnasium at the Church of All Russian Saints in Burlingame, where the Russian language, geography, history and the law of God were taught. Vladimir graduated from the University of San Francisco with a bachelor's degree in Russian literature and music. He then studied architecture for three years.

He acquired his first icon painting skills from N. S. Zadorozhny while painting the Church of All Russian Saints in Burlingame (the construction of the church was led by Vladimir's father). From 1969 to 1978, he was an assistant to the icon painter Father Cyprian (Pyzhov) from the Holy Trinity Monastery in Jordanville, who was invited to San Francisco to paint the Cathedral and other Orthodox churches in California. For several years he went to the icon-painting workshop at the Holy Trinity Monastery to improve in icon painting.

In 1979, Vladimir Krassovsky replaced his mentor and teacher Mikhail Konstantinov as the choir director of the archbishop's choir at Holy Virgin Cathedral.

In 1985, having received the blessing of Father Cyprian, he left his service in the insurance company and devoted himself entirely to icon painting.

Over the next years, he painted about ten Orthodox churches in the United States. He painted several dozen icons for churches and monasteries in Russia, as well as for exalted Russian persons and clergy (including the families of Dmitry Medvedev and Vladimir Putin, Patriarch Alexy II and Patriarch Kirill).

Currently, he has his own icon-painting workshop and is the choir director of Holy Virgin Cathedral.

== Awards ==
- 12 April 2009 – Order of Saint John of Shanghai and San Francisco – presented by Archbishop Kyrill (Dmitrieff) — for 40 years of service to the Orthodox Church Abroad

== Literature ==
- Родионов В. Иконописец // Вестник. – 2001. – № 9 (268).
