= Church of St. Mary of the Spring (Istanbul) =

Greek Orthodox Christian Church and Monastery in Istanbul, Turkey

- Ζωοδόχος Πηγή
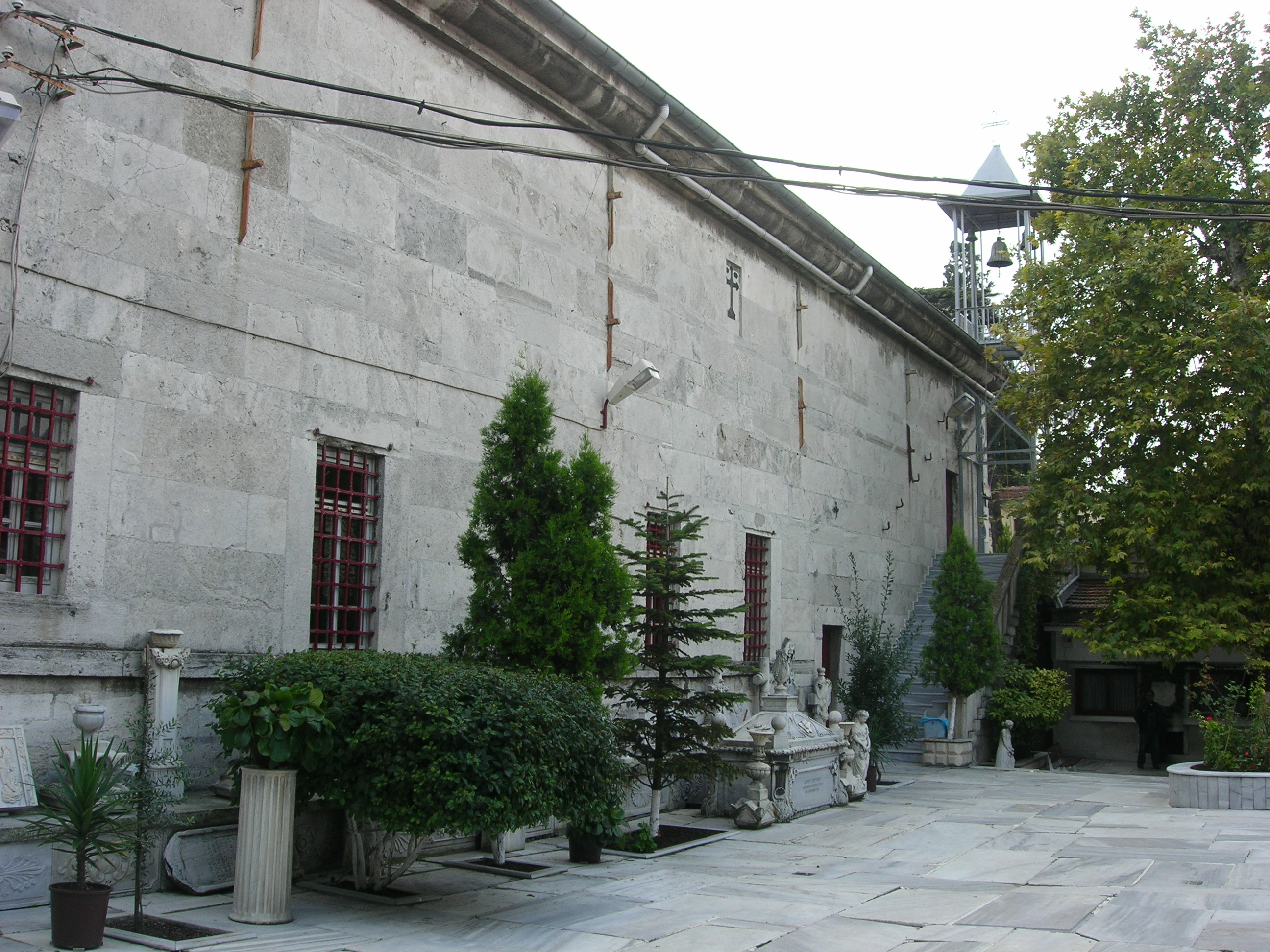
- The modern church viewed from north

- Location in Istanbul
- 41.0066°N 28.9158°E
- Location: Balikli, Istanbul
- Country: Turkey
- Denomination: Greek Orthodox

History
- Founded: 559-560
- Founder: Justinian
- Dedication: Theotokos Pegè

Architecture
- Completed: 1835

The Monastery of the Mother of God at the Spring (full name in Greek: Μονὴ τῆς Θεοτόκου τῆς Πηγῆς, pr. Moni tis Theotóku tis Pigis; Turkish name: Balıklı Meryem Ana Rum Manastiri) or simply Zoödochos Pege (Greek: Ζωοδόχος Πηγή, "Life-giving Spring") is an Eastern Orthodox sanctuary in Istanbul, Turkey. The present church, built in 1835, bears the same dedication as the shrine erected in this place between the end of the fifth and the beginning of the sixth century. After several renovations, this building was destroyed in the first half of the fifteenth century by the Ottomans. The complex got its name from a nearby holy spring, reputed to have healing properties. For almost fifteen hundred years, this sanctuary has been one of the most important pilgrimage sites of Greek Orthodoxy.

== Location ==
The church is located in Istanbul, in the district of Zeytinburnu, in the neighbourhood of Balıklı, along Balıklı Sivrikapı Sokak. It lies a few hundred meters outside the walled city, about five hundred meters from the Gate of Silivri (Turkish: Silivri Kapısı). The complex is protected by a high wall, and – being surrounded by Eastern Orthodox and Armenian cemeteries – lies in a green landscape.

== History ==
=== Byzantine Age ===
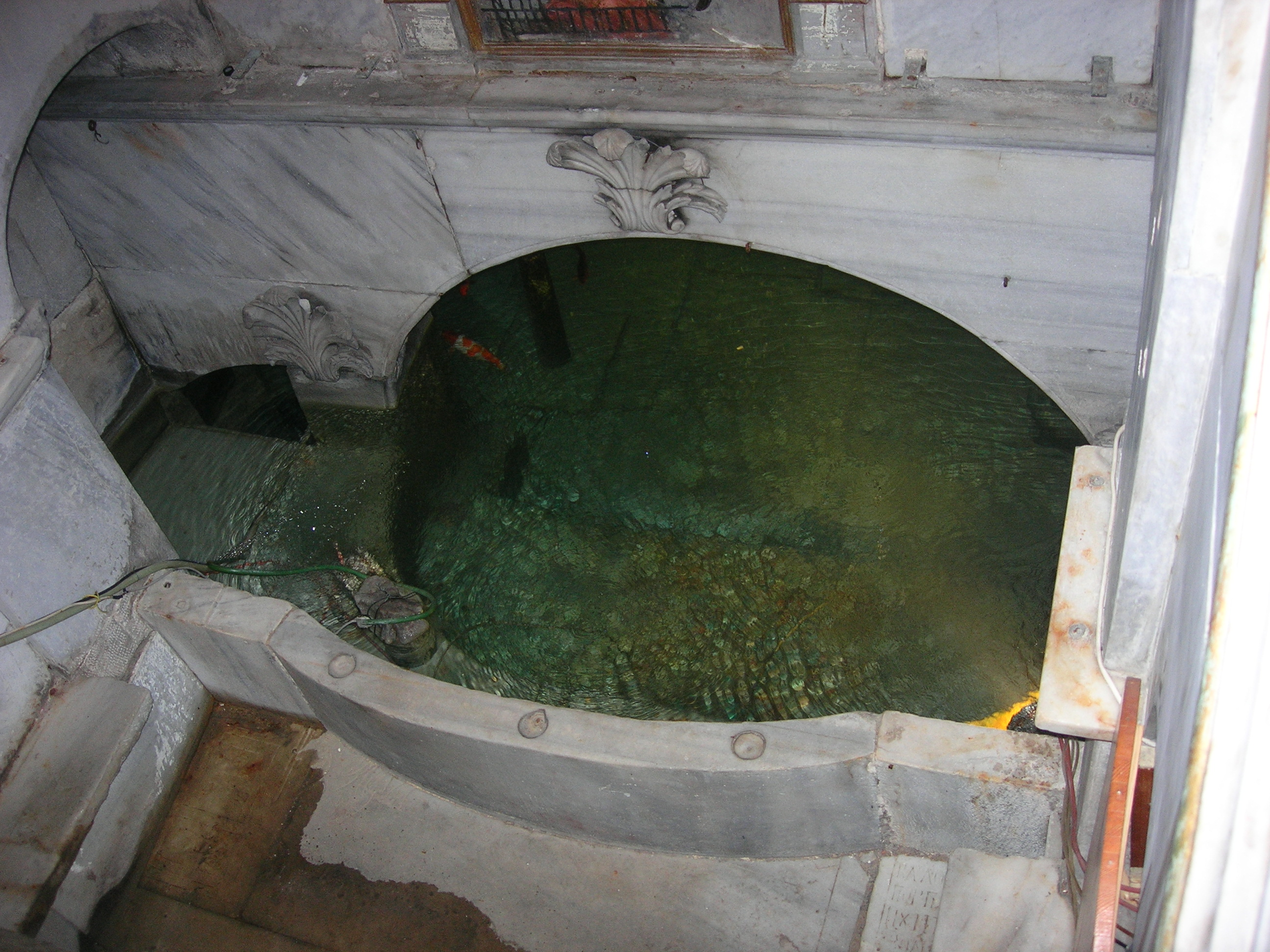
The Hagiasma

According to historians Procopius and Cedrenus, the church was originally erected by Emperor Justinian in the last years of his reign (559-560) near a fountain of water from a holy well (Greek: ἁγίασμα, hagiasma, whence Turkish: ayazma) situated outside the walls of Theodosius II in correspondence of today's Gate of Silivri. During hunting the Emperor noticed a small chapel surrounded by many women. Asking the meaning of the building, he was told that this was the “spring of the miracles”. He at once ordered that a magnificent church be built there, with the material remaining after the erection of the Hagia Sophia.

According to a later legend, the sanctuary was erected by Emperor Leo I the Thracian (r. 457–474) because of a miracle that occurred when he was still a soldier. Before entering the city, Leo met a blind man who asked him to give him water. A female voice ordered the future Emperor to wet the eyes of the blind man with water from a nearby swamp. The same voice added that she had chosen that very place to be worshiped and that he would one day receive the crown to the empire. Leo followed her order and at once the blind man recovered his eyesight. After his accession to the throne, the emperor erected a magnificent church on this place. This legend is possibly a later invention of the monks of the sanctuary. It is possible that, before the Justinian's building was erected, a small monastery had already existed there.

The building underwent many repairs over the centuries. The largest were required because of earthquakes: in 790, under Empress Irene, and – after the great earthquake of 869 – under Basil I (r. 867–886). On 7 September 924 Tsar Simeon I of Bulgaria burned the complex, which was at once restored by Romanos I Lekapenos (r. 920–944). Three years later the son of Simeon, Peter was married to Maria, the niece of Lekapenos.

Due to its position outside the city, the monastery was often used as place of exile. In 1078 Georgios Monomachos was banished there. In 1084, Emperor Alexios I Komnenos confined the philosopher John Italus to the monastery, because of his neoplatonic theories.

After the Latin invasion of 1204, the church was occupied by the Latin clergy and, according to Byzantine sources, this caused the end of the so-called "habitual miracle" (to synetés thauma).

In 1328 Andronikos III Palaiologos used the monastery as base to attack Constantinople. Two years later, as he lay dying in the town of Didymoteicho, he drank water from the spring and recovered at once.

During the Ottoman siege of Constantinople in 1422, Sultan Murad II camped in the sanctuary. It is unknown whether the Byzantines restored the building before the conquest of the city in 1453 Russian pilgrims of the fifteenth century do not mention the church, only the spring.

=== Ottoman and Turkish Ages ===
The 16th-century French scholar Pierre Gilles writes that in 1547 the church did not exist anymore, but the sick continued to attend the spring.

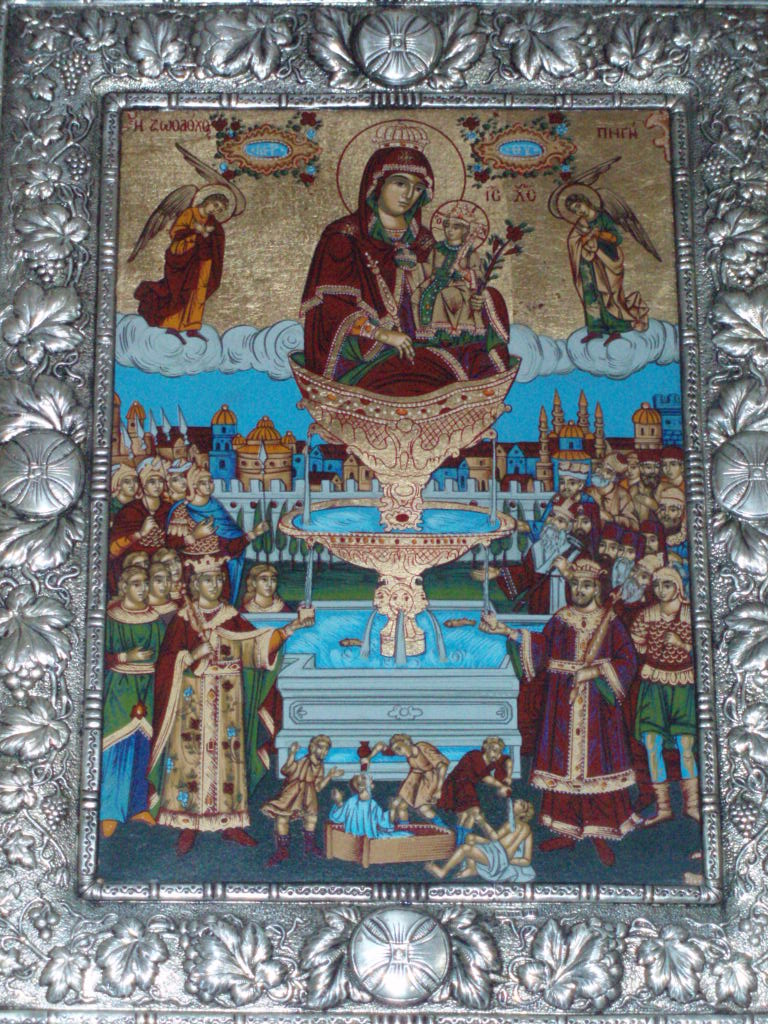
Modern Greek icon of the Theotokos of the Life-giving Spring. The representation shows some differences with respect to the ancient type.

In 1727 Nikodemos, Metropolitan of Dercos and Neochorion, built a small chapel above the Hagiasma. An icon, discovered in the foundations of the old church, was venerated in the chapel. The Armenians tried to take possession of the spring, but several firmans secured the possession to the Greeks. The complex was controlled by Turkish guardians, who collected from the pilgrims a tax that used for the maintenance of the prisons. Later the complex came into the possession of the Patriarchate, until in 1821 the Janissaries destroyed the chapel and poisoned the spring. In 1833, a firman allowed Patriarch Constantius I to rebuild the church, which was inaugurated in 1835.

During the Istanbul Pogrom on 6 September 1955 it was targeted by the state-sponsored fanatic Muslim mob. During this attack the sarcophaguses of the Ecumenical Patriarchs which are located outside the church were opened and their remains were scattered. Moreover, the church and the monastery were completely burned to the ground. Since then the damage has been restored.

The sanctuary is directed by a titular bishop and is one of the most popular among the Orthodox of Istanbul, who visit it especially during the Friday after Easter and on September 14. On these two days, a great feast, both profane and religious takes place there. Funerals of people to be buried in the nearby cemetery are also celebrated in the church.

In Byzantine times the sanctuary was one of the most important in Constantinople. On Ascension Day, the Emperor arrived by boat to the small harbor of the Golden Gate. He rode up to the sanctuary, where he was acclaimed by the factions, who offered him a cross and garlands. Later, he dressed in his ceremonial robes in his apartments and, after receiving the Patriarch, the two entered the church hand-in-hand. After the celebration, he invited the Patriarch for dinner.

Each future Empress coming to Constantinople for her wedding was received by her future spouse in the Monastery of the Spring.

The dedication feast of the church took place on July 9. Moreover, the Ascension, the Marriage at Cana (8 January) and the anniversary of the Miracle of Leo I on 16 August were celebrated here.

The Life-giving spring gave origin to many churches and monasteries bearing the same name in the Greek world, but most of them were erected after the end of the Byzantine Empire.

The icon that represents the Virgin of the Spring shows the Virgin blessing and embracing the Child. She is surrounded by two angels and usually is sitting on the more elevated of two basins which are sustained by a water jet coming from a larger marble basin adorned with a cross. Around this, stands the Emperor with his guard, while on the left there is the Patriarch with his bishops. On the background, is represented Leo I with the blind man together with the walls of the city. Under the basin a paralytic and a mad are healed with the spring's water.

== Description ==
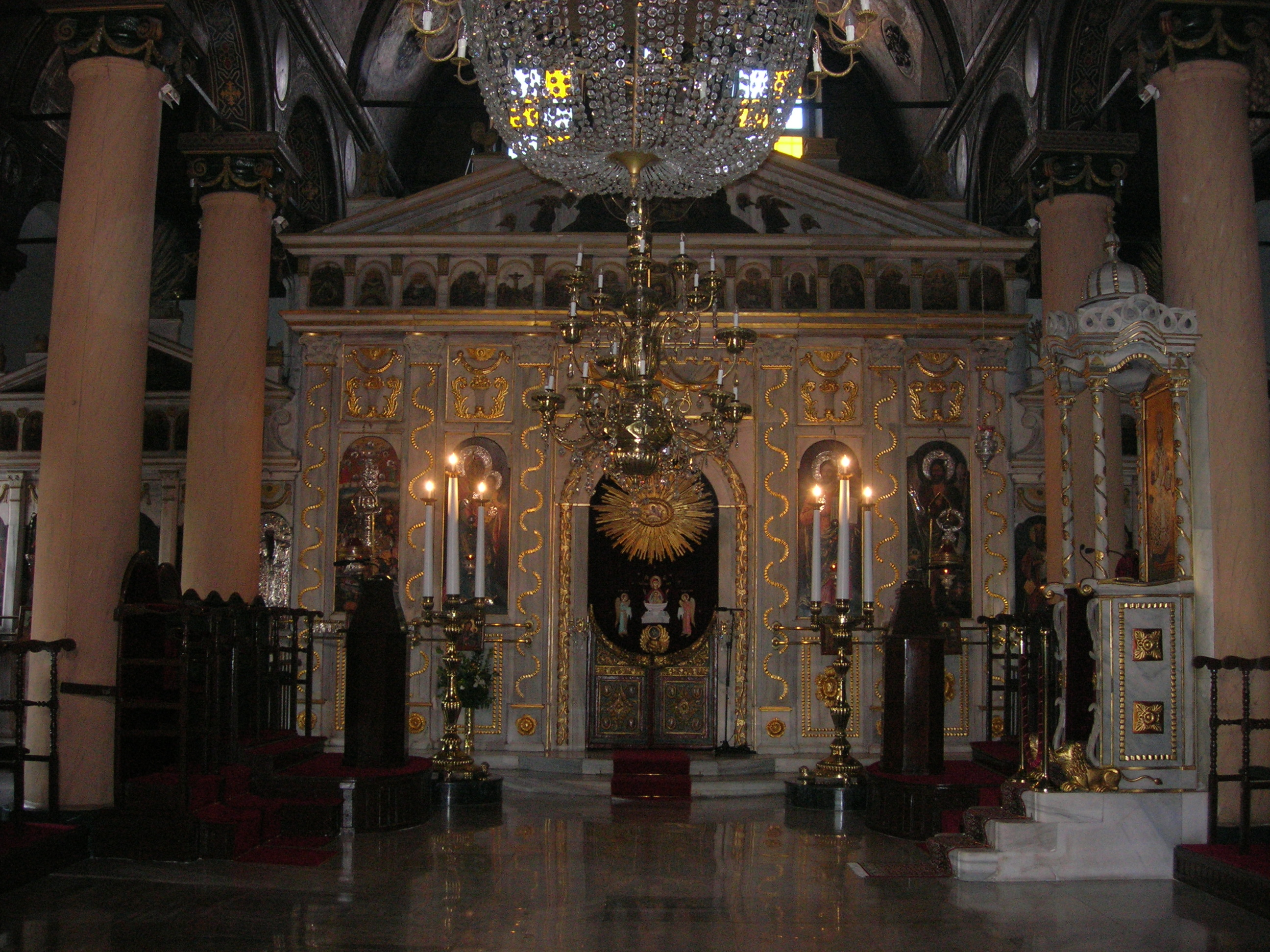
The Interior of the church

According to Nikephoros Kallistos (writing in fourteenth century) the church by that time had a rectangular shape of basilica type, with a 4:3 proportion between the sides, and was partly subterranean. It was surrounded by two exonarthexes (on the E and W side) and two esonarthexes (on the S and N sides). The light coming from outside was concentrated on the source, which could be reached descending two stairs having 25 steps. Each stair was delimited by a marble balustrade and surmounted by a marble arcade. The water fell into a marble basin, and a canalization distributed it in the church. The edifice was adorned with frescos and surmounted by a dome glittering with pure gold. Around the church there were three chapels, devoted respectively to Saint Eustratius, the Theotokos and Saint Anne.

The present church is also rectangular in shape. It is roughly oriented in E - W direction, and has three naves divided by columns and preceded by an esonarthex. By the Northwest corner rises a metallic bell tower. The interior is richly adorned. On the right side near the middle of the nave there is a Pulpit, while at the end lies a rich iconostasis. Right of the iconostasis there is an icon which the tradition says painted by Saint Luke. The source lies in a subterranean crypt outside the church, and can be accessed descending a stair parallel the long sides of the church. A symmetric stair leads from the crypt to the church's yard. The crypt is adorned with paintings and icons, and is surmounted by a dome painted with Christ in a starry sky. The water flows into a marble basin, where fishes are swimming. These fishes, present in the basin since centuries, gave origin to the Turkish name of the complex (balikli in Turkish means "place where there are fishes"). According to a late legend, the day of the Conquest of Constantinople a monk was frying fishes in a pan near the source. When a colleague announced him the fall of the city, he replied that he would have believed him only if the fishes in the pan would have come back to life. After his words these jumped in the source and began swimming.

The yard in front of a church is a cemetery with marble tombs – mostly of them dating to the nineteenth and twentieth century - belonging to wealthy Rûms of Istanbul. Also several Patriarchs are buried here. Characteristic of this cemetery are also several gravestones with Karamanli inscriptions, which constitute by far the largest surviving group in this language. The complex is also surrounded by two large cemeteries, respectively Armenian and Greek, each enclosed in high walls.

About one kilometer south of the church is active an important Greek hospital, the Balikli Rum Hastanesi Vakif (“Balikli Greek Hospital Foundation”).

== Gallery ==
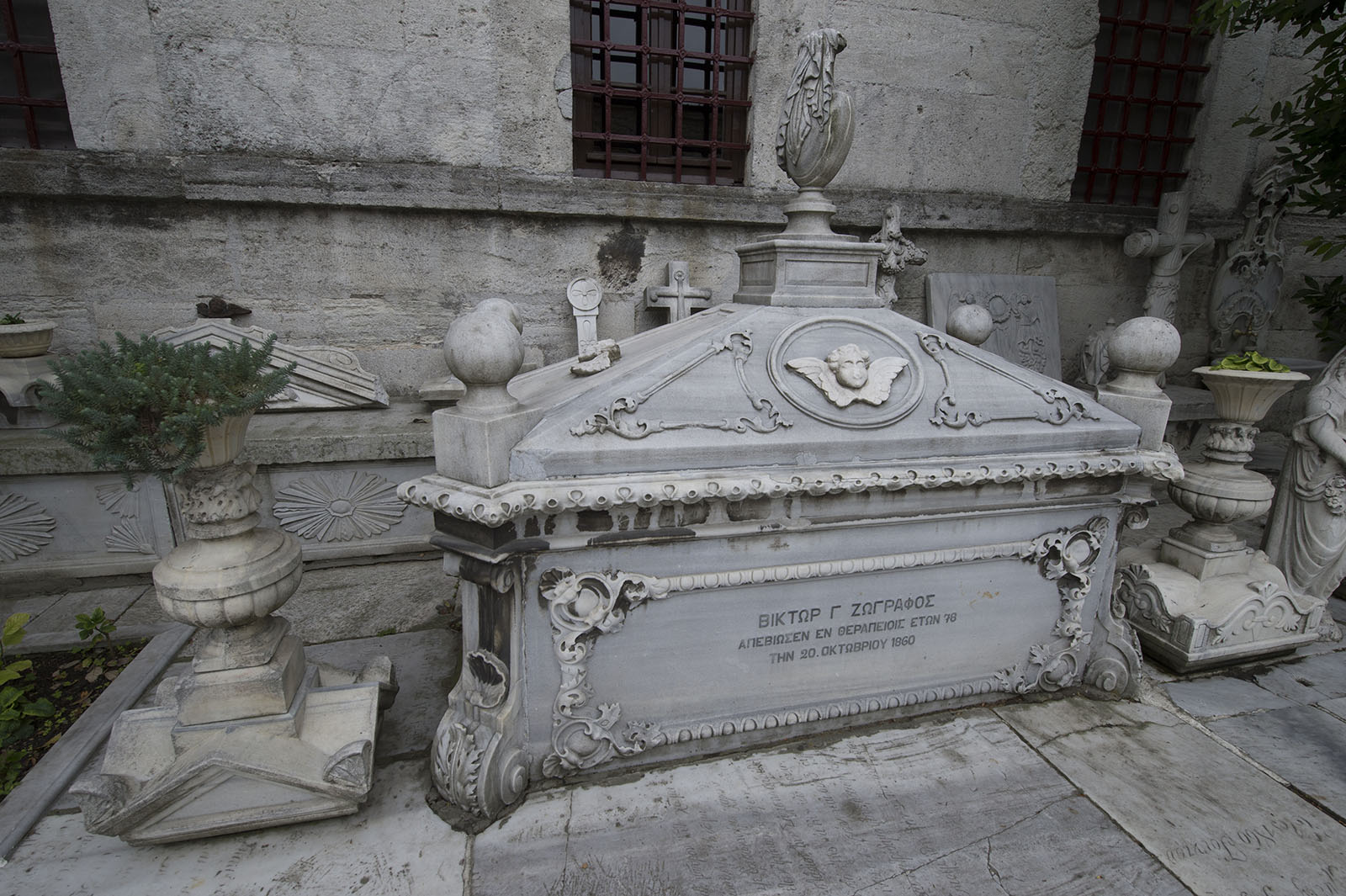
Church of St. Mary of the Spring graveyard

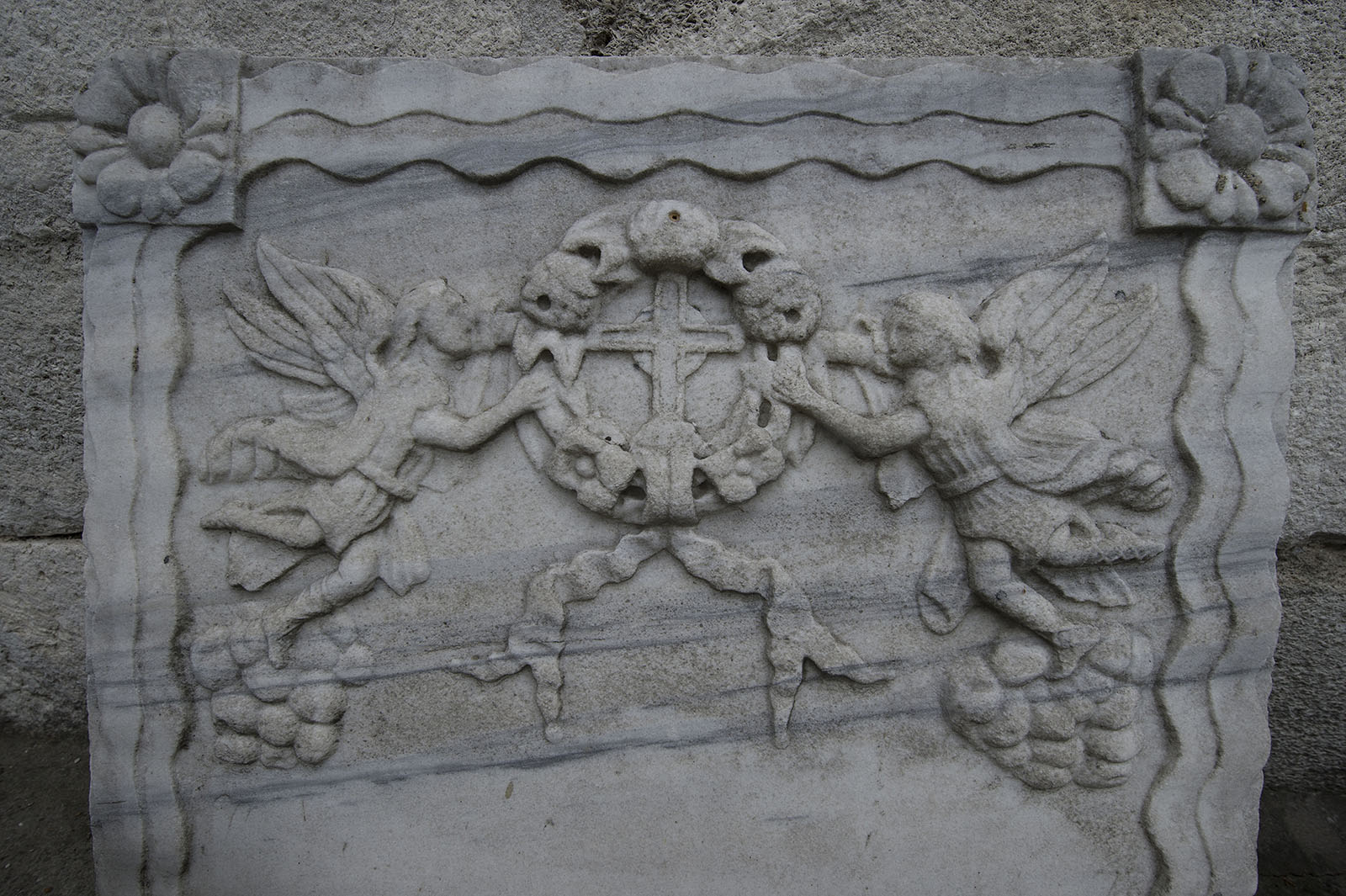
Church of St. Mary of the Spring graveyard

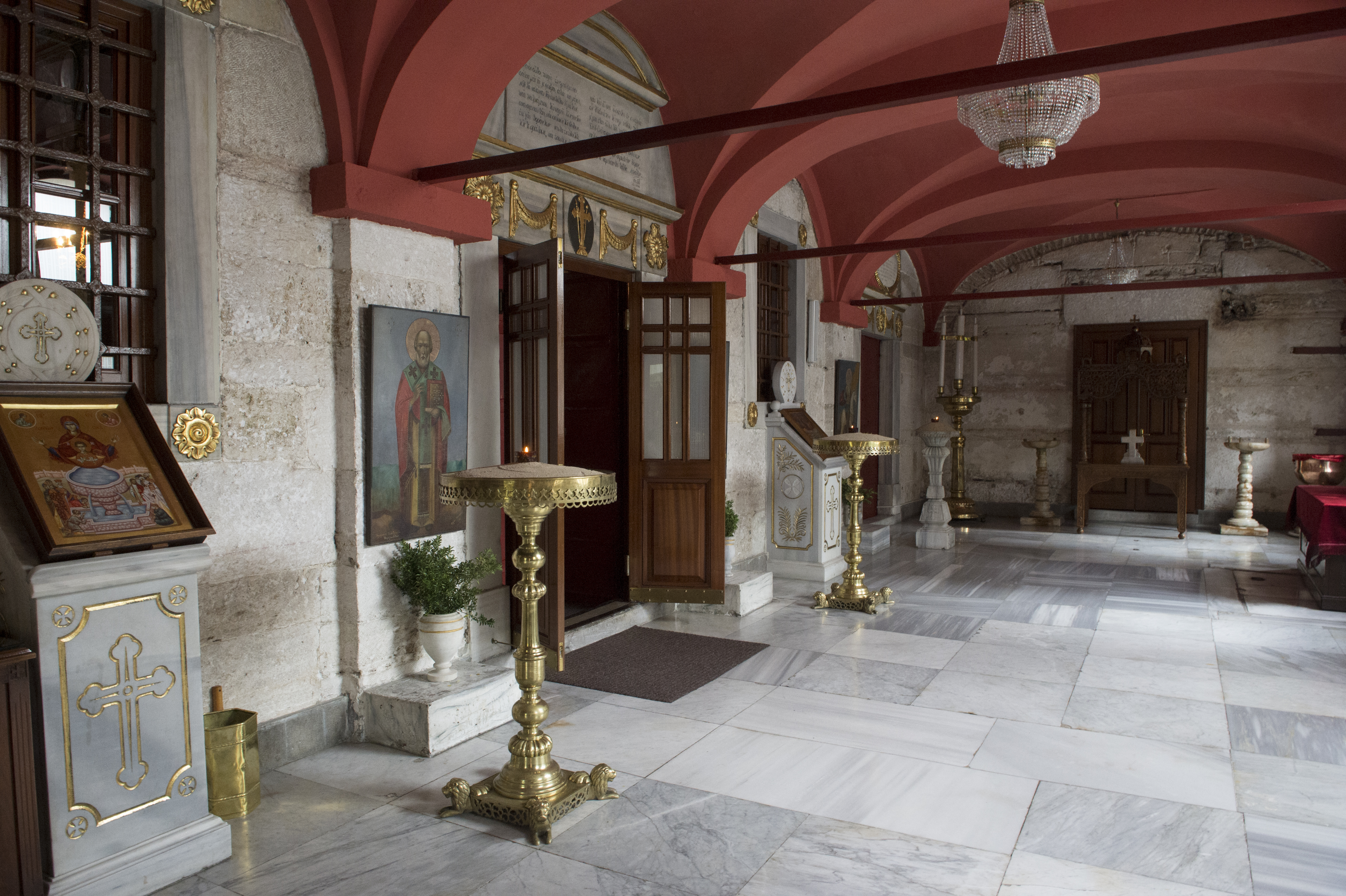
Church of St. Mary of the Spring Narthex

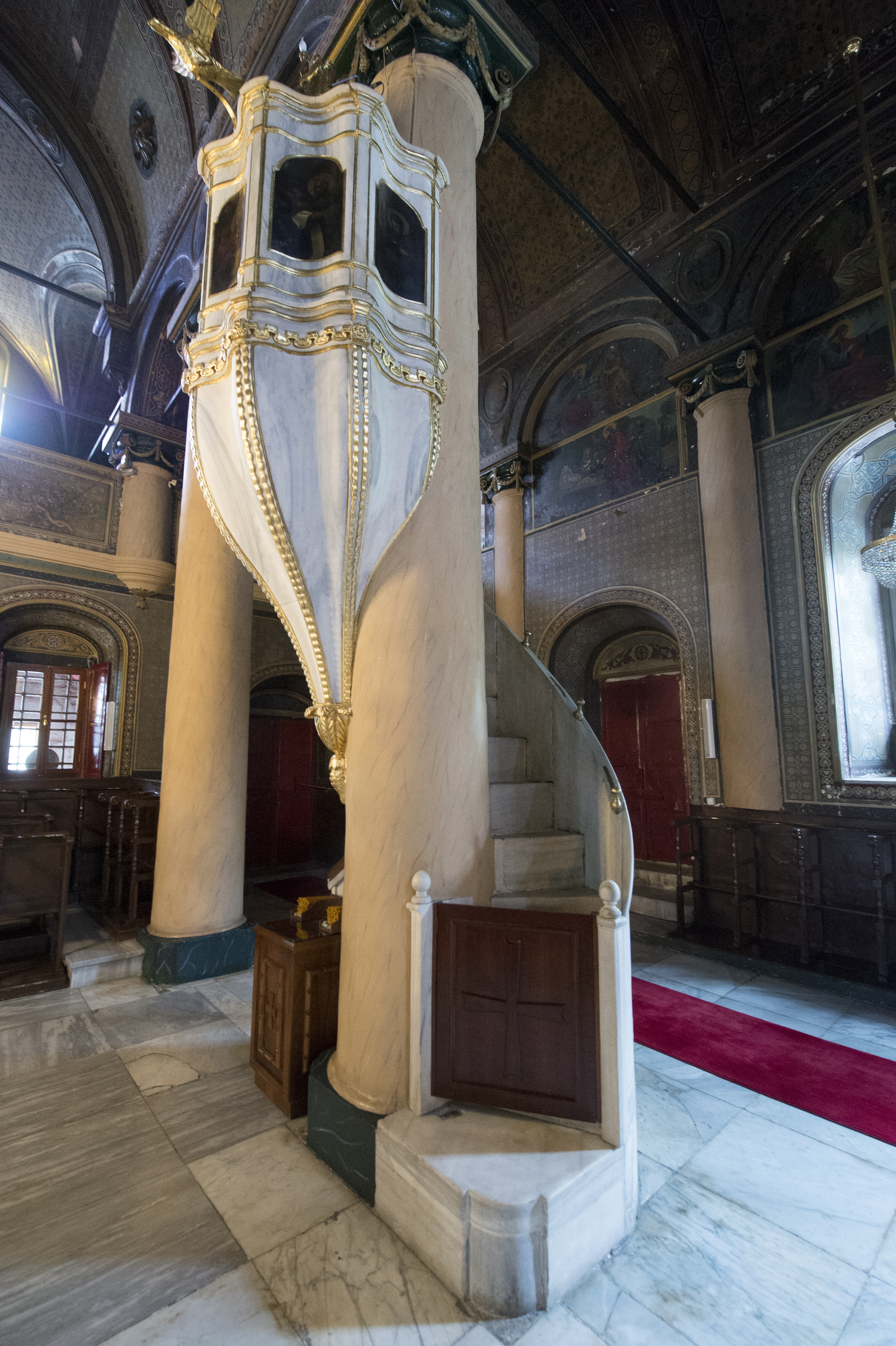
Church of St. Mary of the Spring pulpit

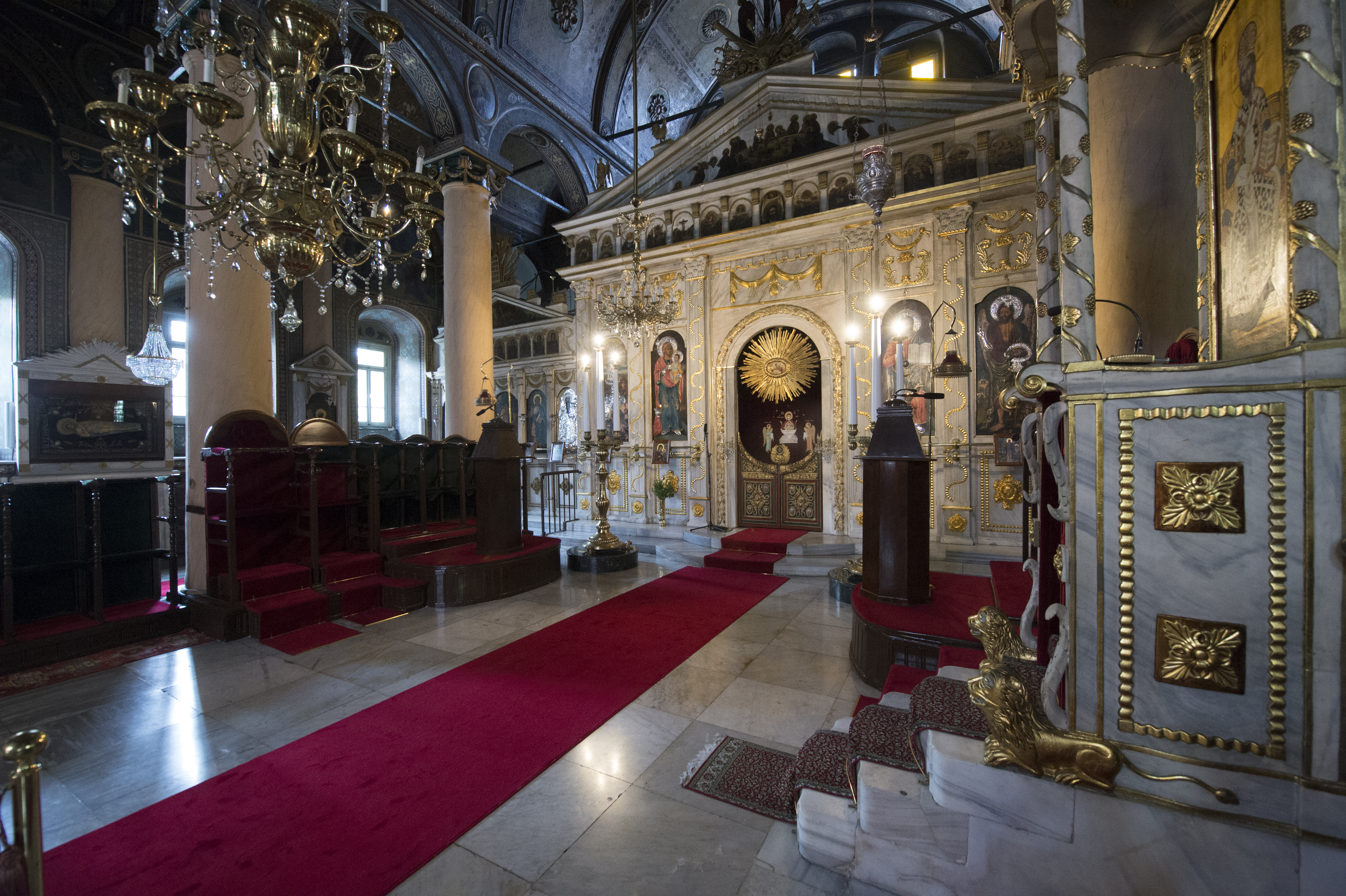
Church of St. Mary of the Spring general view

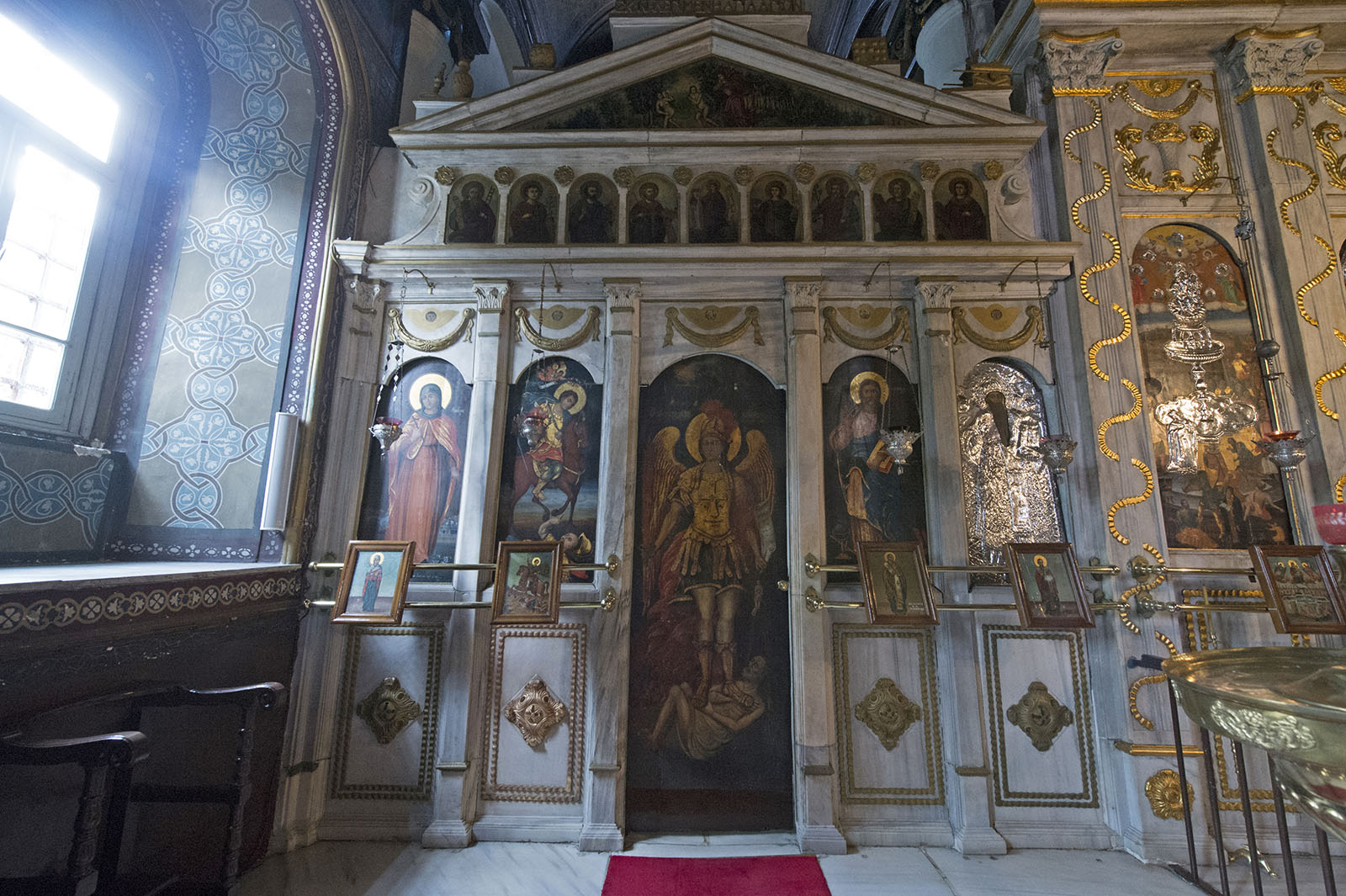
Church of St. Mary of the Spring left side iconostasis

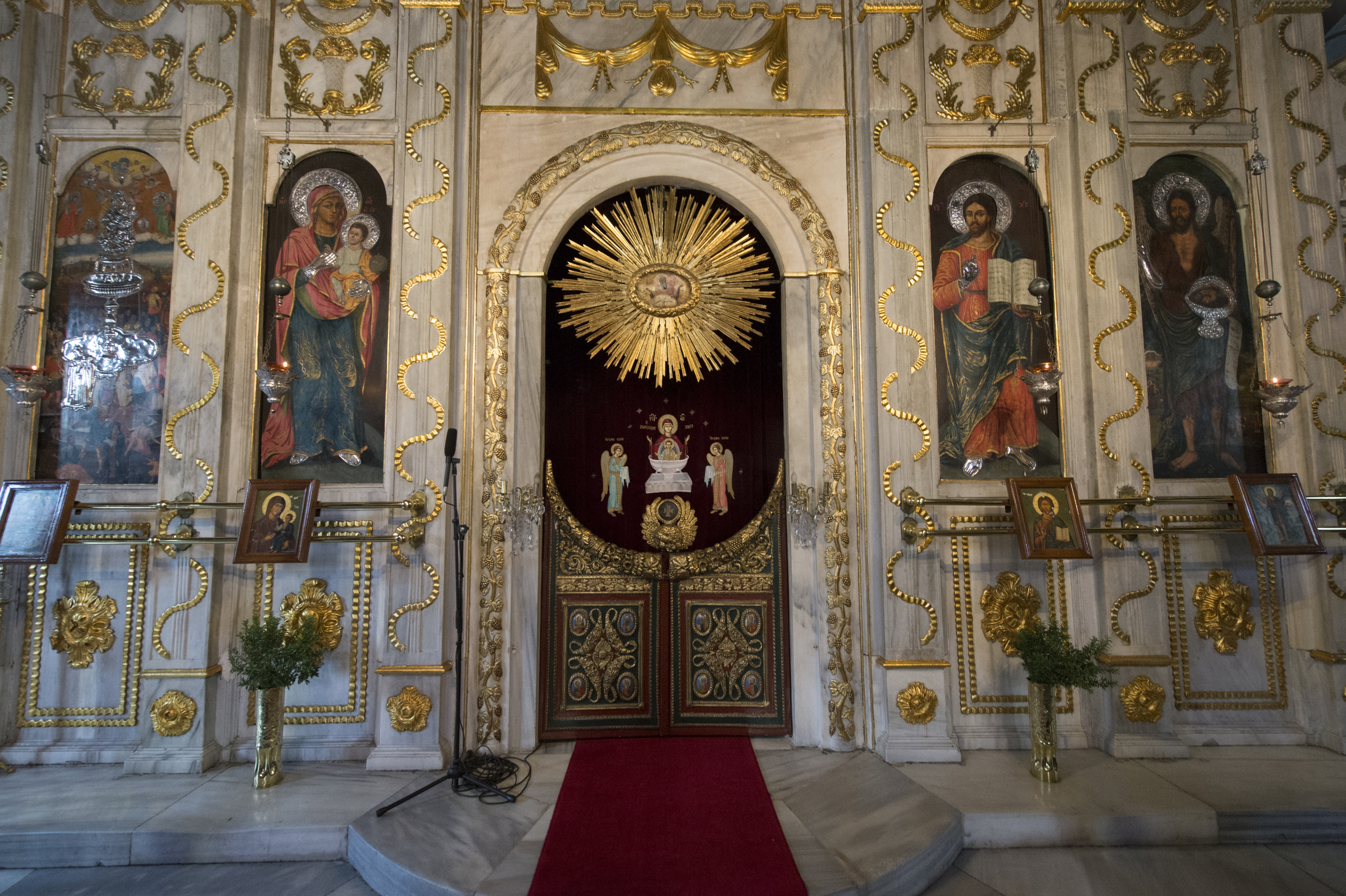
Church of St. Mary of the Spring centre of iconostasis

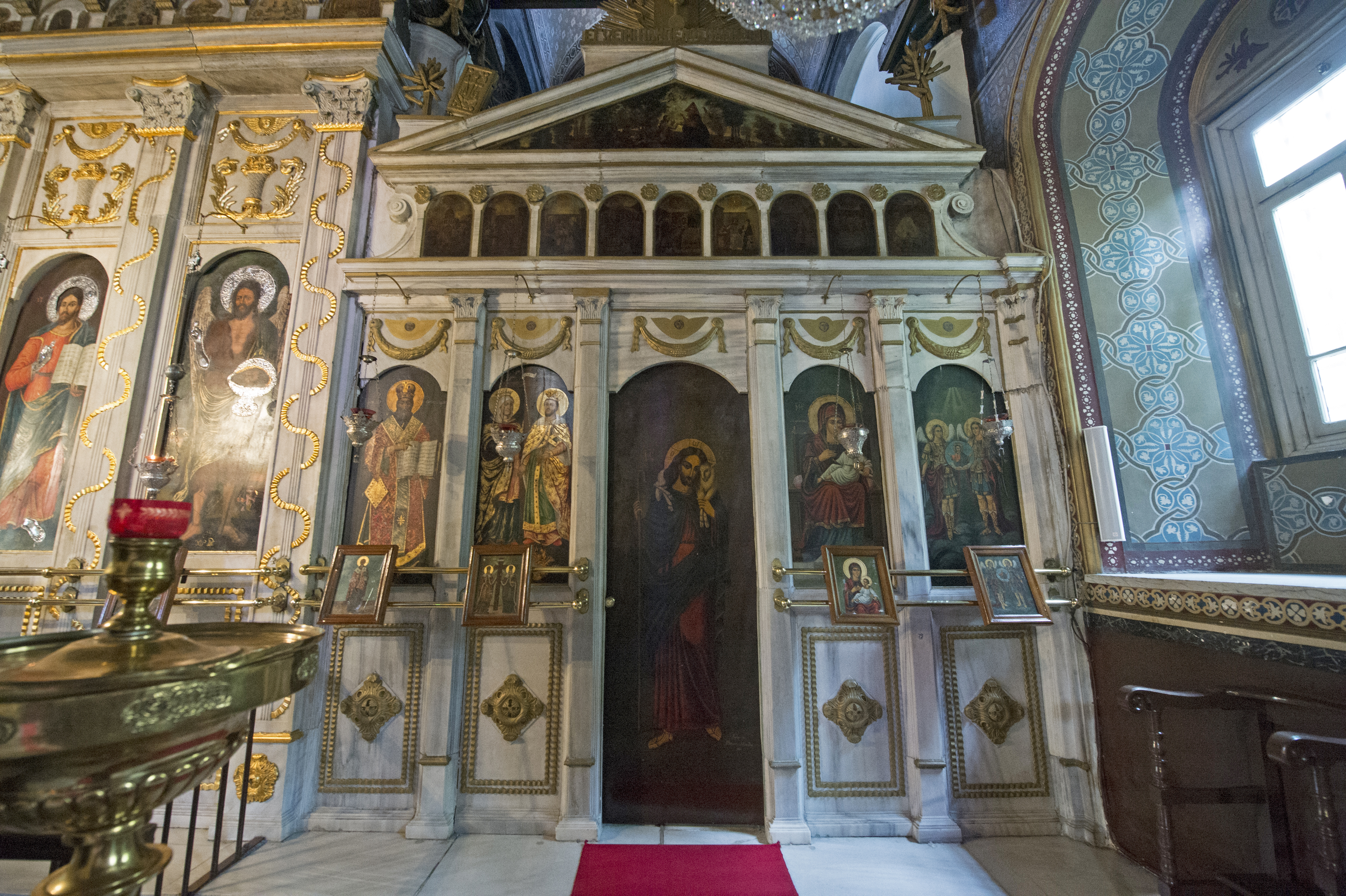
Church of St. Mary of the Spring right side iconostasis

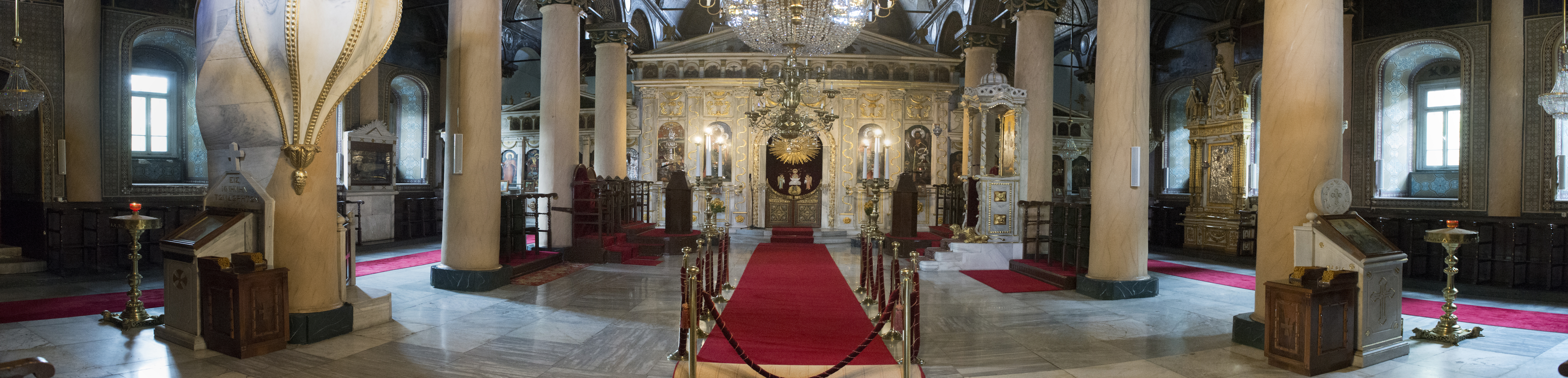
Church of St. Mary of the Spring panorama

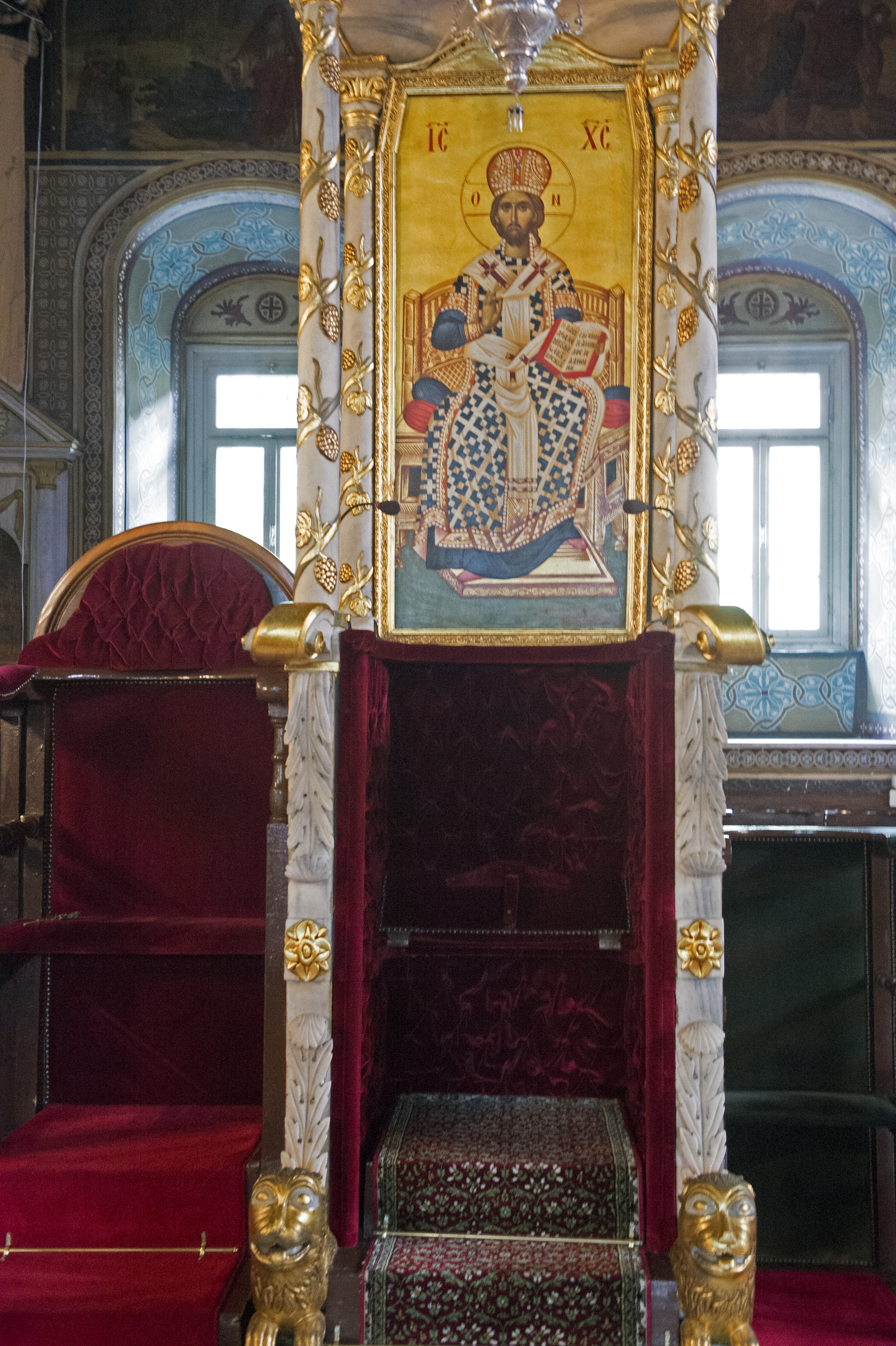
Church of St. Mary of the Spring bishop's throne

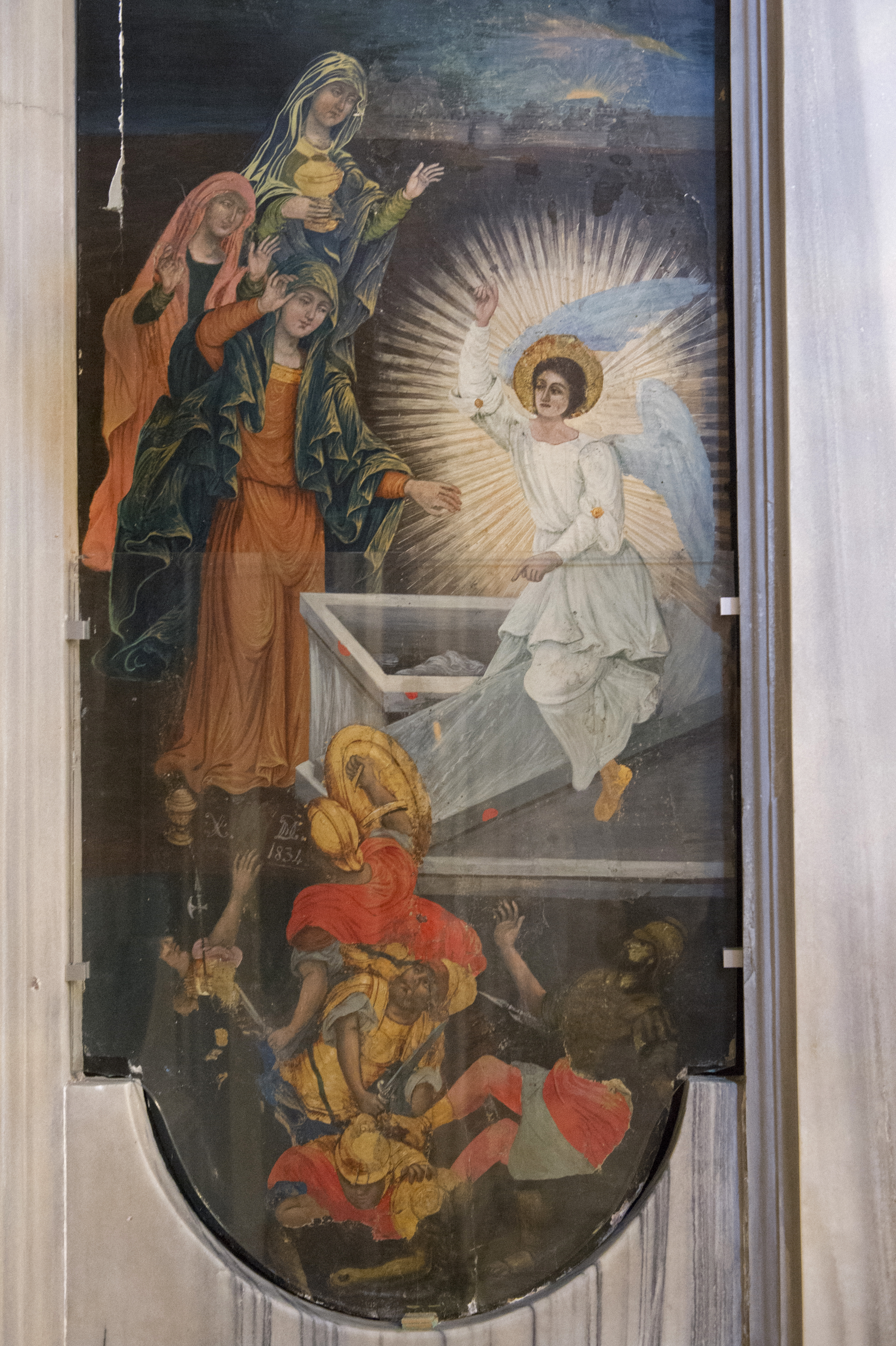
Church of St. Mary of the Spring painting

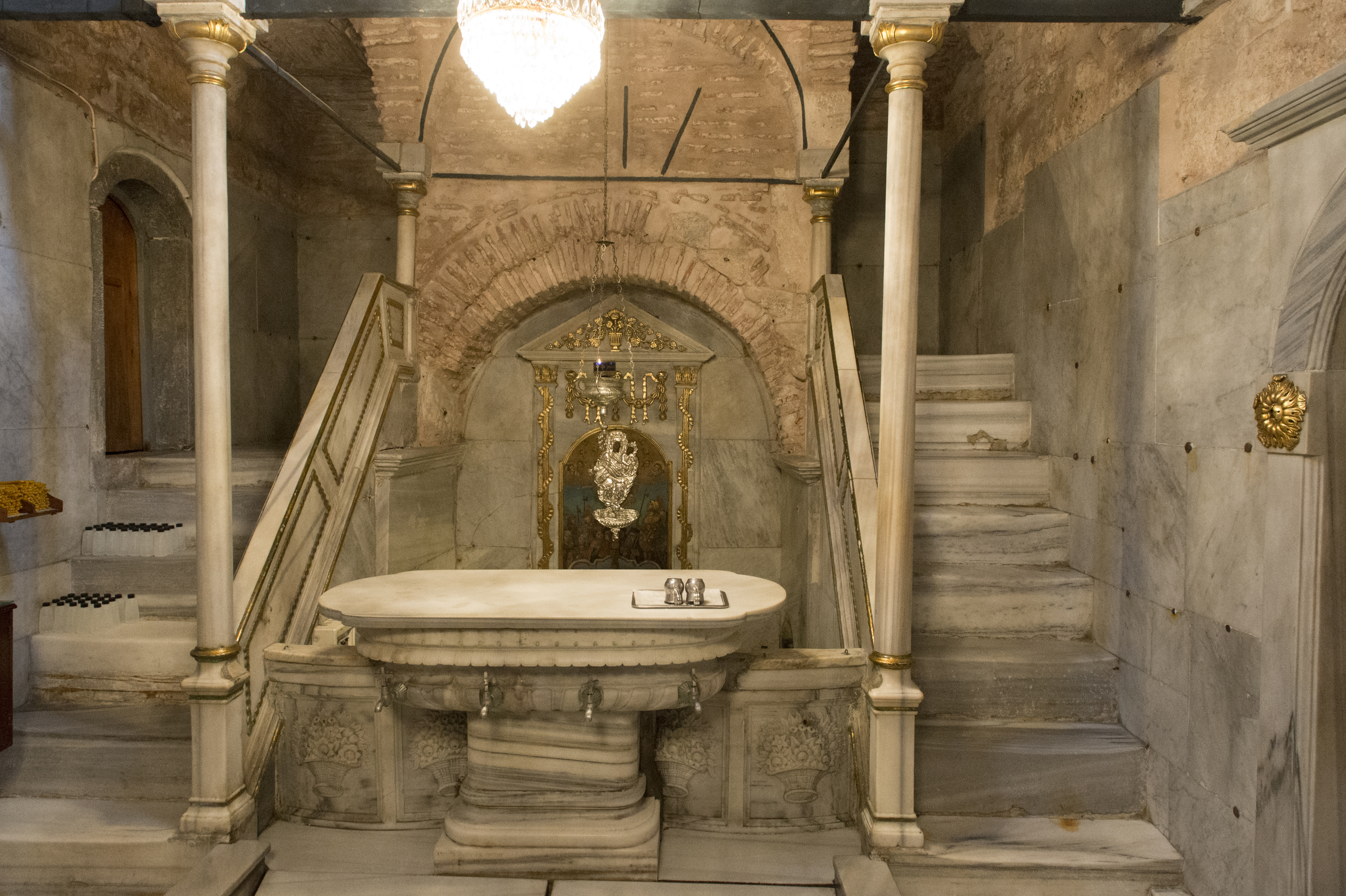
Church of St. Mary of the Spring in crypt

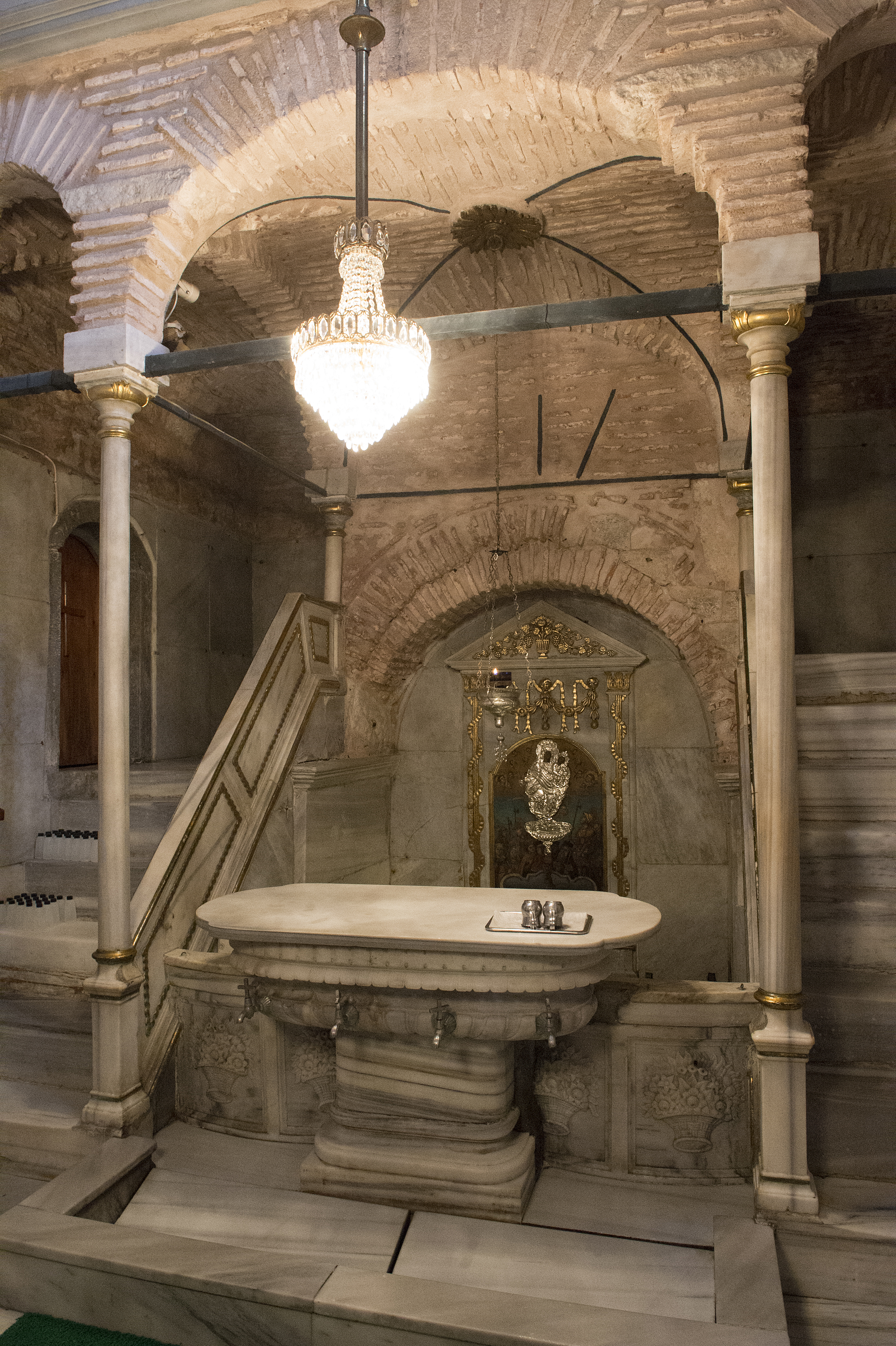
Church of St. Mary of the Spring in crypt

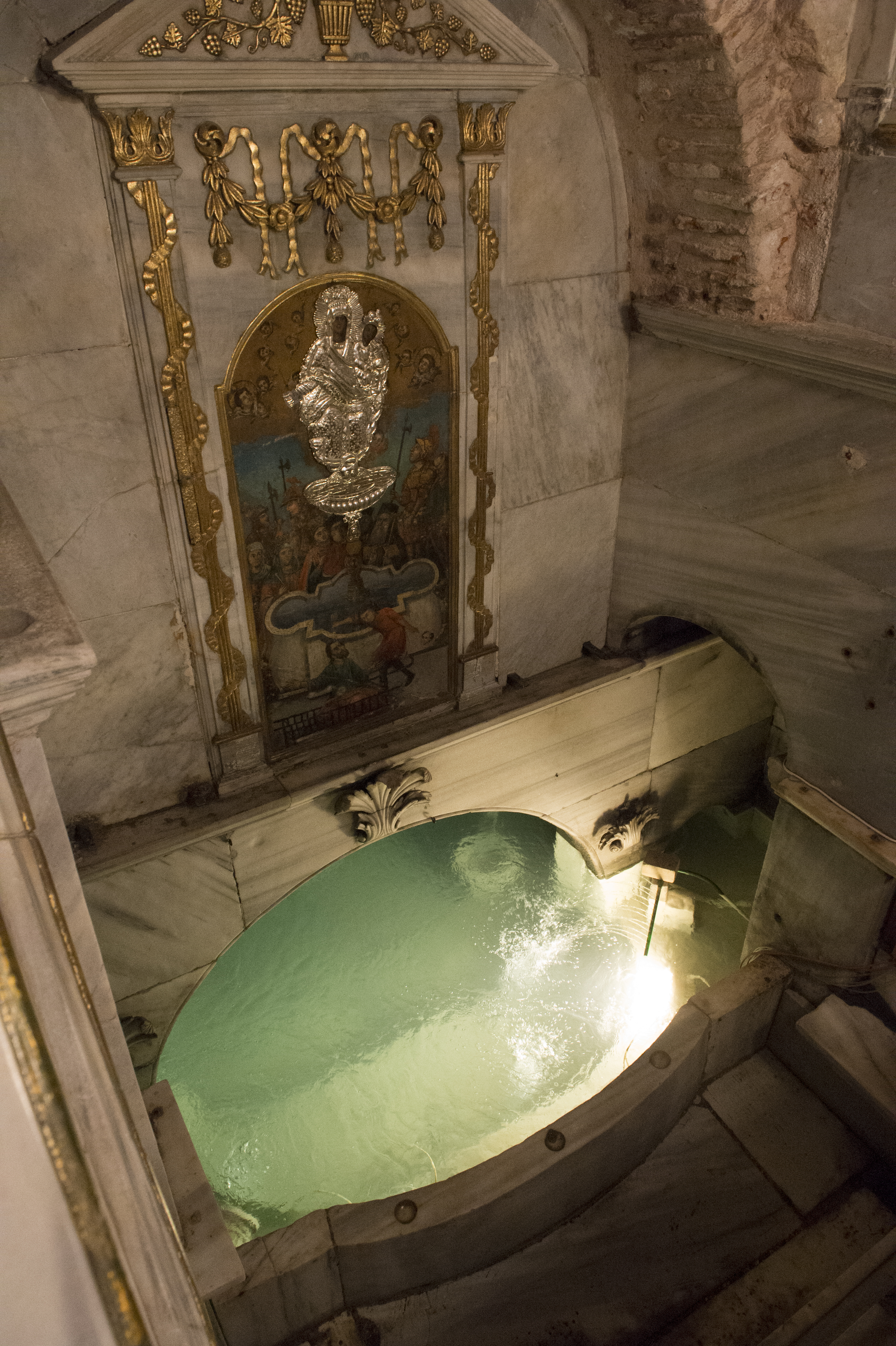
Church of St. Mary of the Spring fish pond

== Sources ==
- Mamboury, Ernest (1953). The Tourists' Istanbul. Istanbul: Çituri Biraderler Basımevi.
- Janin, Raymond (1953). La Géographie ecclésiastique de l'Empire byzantin. 1. Part: Le Siège de Constantinople et le Patriarcat Oecuménique. 3rd Vol. : Les Églises et les Monastères (in French). Paris: Institut Français d'Etudes Byzantines.
- Eyice, Semavi (1955). Istanbul. Petite Guide a travers les Monuments Byzantins et Turcs (in French). Istanbul: Istanbul Matbaası.
- Müller-Wiener, Wolfgang (1977). Bildlexikon zur Topographie Istanbuls: Byzantion, Konstantinupolis, Istanbul bis zum Beginn d. 17 Jh (in German). Tübingen: Wasmuth. ISBN 978-3-8030-1022-3.
- Majeska, George P. (1984). "The Monastery of the Virgin at Pege". Russian Travelers to Constantinople in the Fourteenth and Fifteenth Centuries. Dumbarton Oaks. pp. 325–326. ISBN 978-0-88402-101-8.
- Blackwell, Basil (1996) [1978]. "Some karamanlidika inscriptions from the monastery of the Zoodokos Pigi, Balikli, Istanbul". In Clogg, Richard (ed.). Anatolica - Studies in the Greek East in the 18th and 19th Centuries. Aldershot, Hampshire: VARIORUM. ISBN 0-86078-543-2.
