= Feast of Christ the King =

Feast at the last sunday of the liturgical year

Solemnity of Christ the King
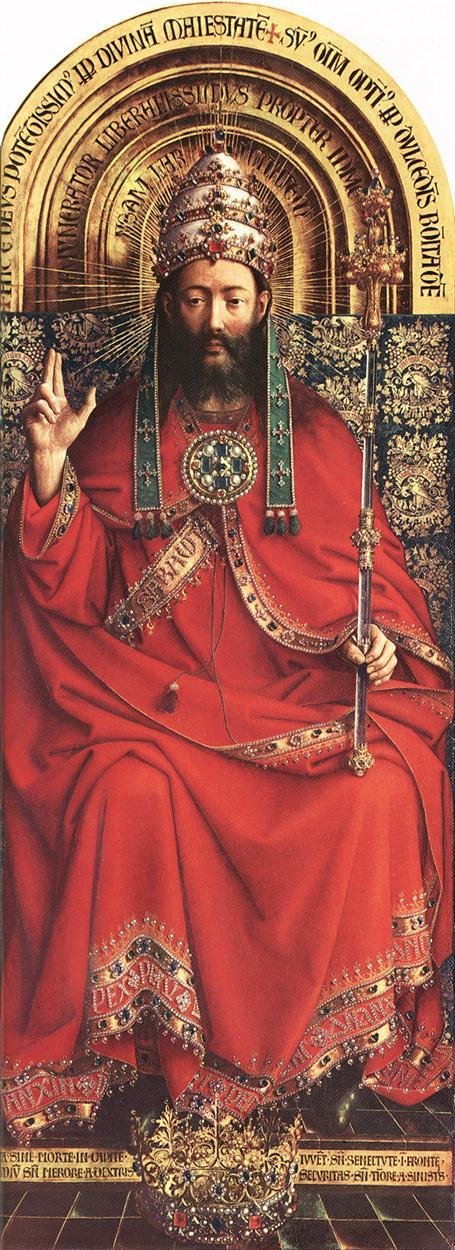
- Painting of Christ in Majesty from the Ghent Altarpiece by Hubert and Jan van Eyck (AD 1427)
- Observed by: Catholic Church; Lutheranism; Anglican Communion; Methodist churches Moravian Church; Church of the Nazarene; Reformed churches Western Rite Orthodoxy; Other Christian denominations
- Liturgical color: White
- Observances: Church services Eucharistic adoration for a full day
- Date: Last Sunday of the Liturgical year, or last Sunday in October (Extraordinary Form)
- 2025 date: 23 November (ordinary form); 26 October (extraordinary form)
- 2026 date: 22 November (ordinary form); 25 October (extraordinary form)
- 2027 date: 21 November (ordinary form); 31 October (extraordinary form)
- 2028 date: 26 November (ordinary form); 29 October (extraordinary form)
- First time: 31 October 1926

The Solemnity of Our Lord Jesus Christ, King of the Universe, commonly referred to as the Feast of Christ the King, Christ the King Sunday or Reign of Christ Sunday, is a feast in the liturgical year which emphasises the true kingship of Christ. The Catholic, Lutheran, Anglican, Moravian, Methodist, Nazarene, Reformed and United Protestant churches celebrate the Feast of Christ the King.

The feast emphasizes the true kingship of Christ after the upheavals resulting from the First World War and the end of all four major monarchies in mainland Europe. It was meant to respond to the rise of atheism and secularization. For the Roman Rite, it was instituted by Pope Pius XI in 1925. In 1970, its observance was moved from end of October to the last Sunday of Ordinary Time and thus to the end of the liturgical year. The Methodist, Anglican and Presbyterian churches often observe this as part of the liturgical season of Kingdomtide, which runs between the Fourth Sunday before Advent and the Feast of Christ the King. The earliest date on which the Feast of Christ the King can occur is 20 November and the latest is 26 November. It heralds the end of Ordinary Time, which continues up until the First Sunday of Advent. Depending on the year, Saint Andrew's Day, significant in some cultures, may fall prior to the First Sunday of Advent.

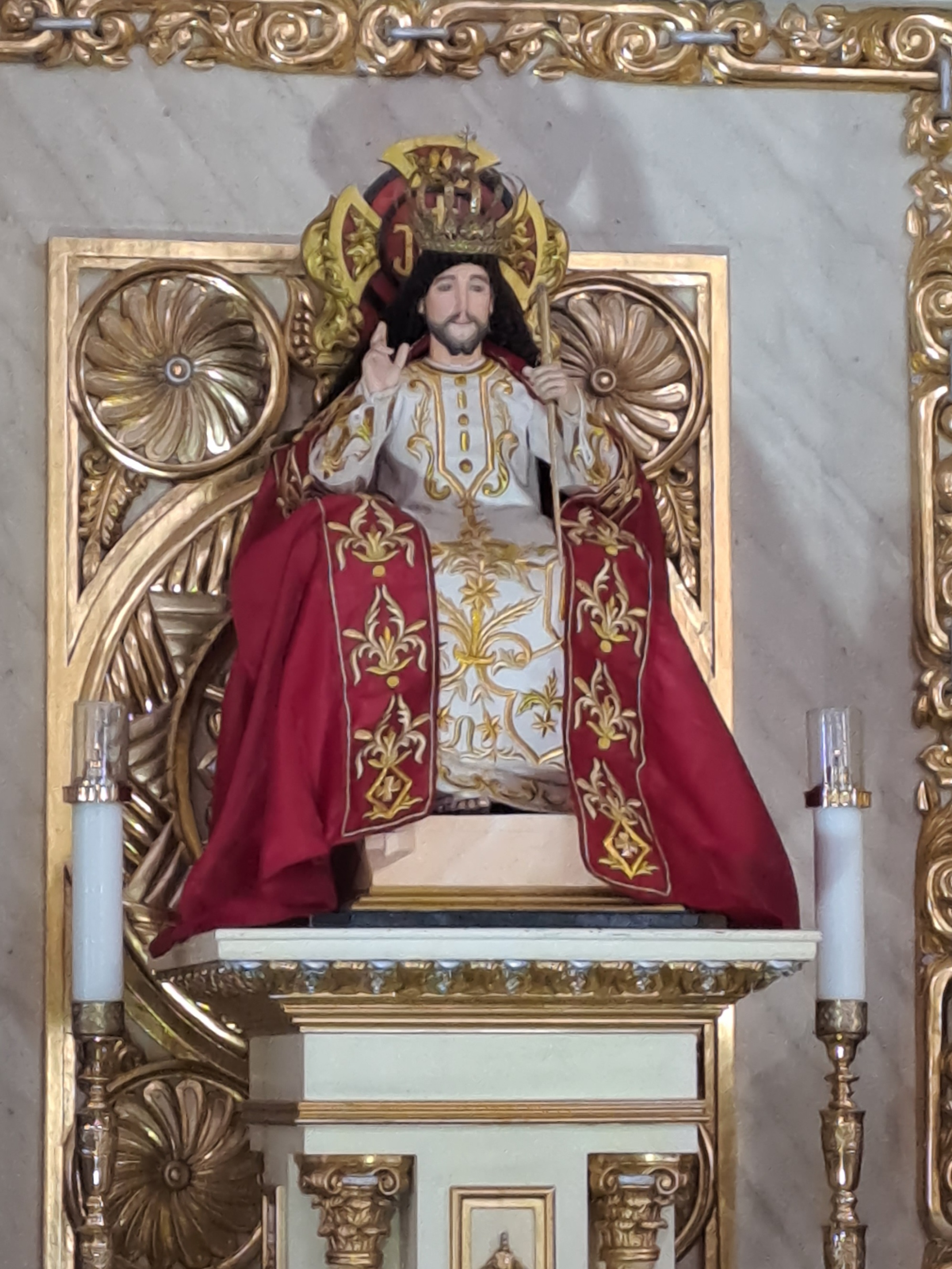
An image of Christ the King at the Antipolo Cathedral, Philippines

It is contained in the Revised Common Lectionary. It is also observed on the same computed date as the last Sunday of the Liturgical year, the Sunday before the First Sunday of Advent, by Western Rite parishes of the Russian Orthodox Church Outside Russia. Catholics adhering to the Extraordinary Form of the Roman Rite use the General Roman Calendar of 1960 and continue to observe the Solemnity on the date established in 1925, the last Sunday in October.

== Origin in patristics ==
According to Cyril of Alexandria, Christ "has dominion over all creatures, a dominion not seized by violence nor usurped, but by his essence and by nature. His kingship is founded upon the hypostatic union. From this it follows not only that Christ is to be adored by angels and men, but that to him as man angels and men are subject, and must recognize his empire; by reason of the hypostatic union Christ has power over all creatures."

The Feast of Christ the King has an eschatological dimension, pointing to the end of time when the kingdom of Jesus will be established in all its fullness to the ends of the earth.

== Observance ==
=== Catholic Church ===
Dates for the Feast of Christ the King, 2021–2031
Year	Ordinary Form	Extraordinary Form (1960 calendar)
2021	21 November	31 October
2022	20 November	30 October
2023	26 November	29 October
2024	24 November	27 October
2025	23 November	26 October
2026	22 November	25 October
2027	21 November	31 October
2028	26 November	29 October
2029	25 November	28 October
2030	24 November	27 October
2031	23 November	26 October

Pope Pius XI, who wanted to crown the jubilee year of 1925 by the introduction of a new feast to honour the kingship of Christ, instituted the Feast of Christ the King (Festum Domini nostri Jesu Christi regis) with his encyclical Quas primas of 1925, in response to growing secularism and secular ultra-nationalism, and in the context of the unresolved Roman Question.

In November 1926, Pope Pius XI gave his direct assent for the priest of a promising young parish in Mount Lookout, Cincinnati, to establish the first church dedicated to Christ under the title of King. In May 1927, a purpose-built sanctuary was consecrated. 1956 saw the construction of the current church, led by the architect Edward J. Schulte. The campus is an unapologetic love letter to its royal namesake, featuring a towering Byzantine mosaic of Christ, crowned and robed, above the high altar where Catholic practice usually expects a crucifix (most Protestant institutions simply employ symbolic crosses). This instance illustrates a marked change of tone that arose as a product of the Vatican's endorsement of this feast and the associated devotional.

The date was established as the last Sunday of the month of October, the Sunday which immediately precedes the Feast of All Saints.

In his motu proprio Mysterii Paschalis of 1969, Pope Paul VI amended the title of the Feast to Domini Nostri Iesu Christi universorum Regis (Our Lord Jesus Christ King of the Universe). He also moved it to the last Sunday of the liturgical year. Through this choice of date "the eschatological importance of this Sunday is made clearer". The feast was assigned the highest rank of solemnity. The liturgical vestments for the day are white.

In the extraordinary form, as happens with all Sundays whose liturgies are replaced by those of important feasts, (Note: Examples are the Solemnities of the Holy Name of Jesus, the Holy Family, and the Most Holy Trinity. Indeed before the reform of Pope Pius X most Sundays deferred to any feast of the rank of double, and these were the majority. (Missale Romanum, published by Pustet, 1862)) the prayers of the Sunday on which the celebration of the feast of Christ the King occurs are used on the ferias (weekdays) of the following week. The Sunday liturgy is thus not totally omitted.

Since 2021, the diocesan-level celebrations of World Youth Day have taken place on the Solemnity of Christ the King.

The most common breviary of the Ukrainian Greek-Catholic Church, published by the Basilian Fathers, contains propers for the "Feast of Christ the King" which is celebrated on the last Sunday in October or on the fifth Sunday before the Nativity of our Lord.

=== Moravian Church ===
In the Moravian Church, Reign of Christ Sunday is the feast marking the end of Pentecostide. White is the liturgical colour associated with the Reign of Christ.

=== Lutheran churches ===
In the Evangelical-Lutheran Church of Sweden and the Church of Finland, this day is referred to as Judgement Sunday, previously highlighting the final judgement, though after the Swedish Lectionary of 1983 the theme of the day was amended to the Return of Christ. A distinct season of Kingdomtide is or has been observed by a number of churches on the four Sundays before Advent, either officially or semi-officially.

In the Evangelical Lutheran Church in America, this day is referred to as "Christ the King Sunday", or, alternatively, the "Realm of Christ/Reign of Christ" Sunday, and is observed on the last Sunday of the liturgical year.

=== Anglican churches ===
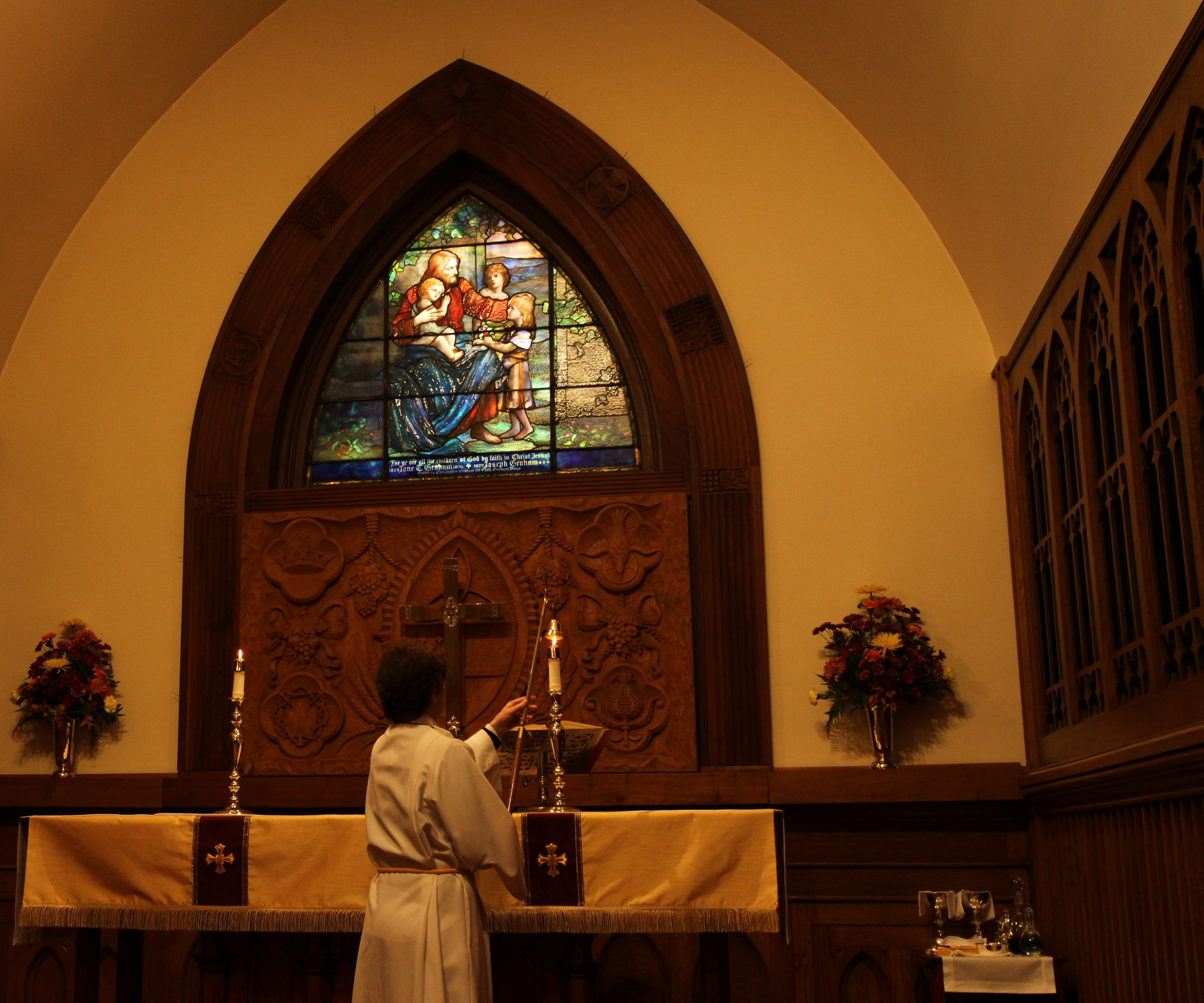
Altar cloth used for the Feast of Christ the King at an Episcopal church

In the Church of England, the Feast of Christ the King falls on "the Sunday next before Advent", when "[t]he year that begins with the hope of the coming Messiah ends with the proclamation of his universal sovereignty."

In the Episcopal Church (United States), Christ the King Sunday "is unofficially celebrated in some Episcopal parishes, but it is not mentioned in the Episcopal calendar of the church year." However, the collect for that Sunday, which mentions Jesus as "King of kings and Lord of Lords" indicates an affinity with the feast day, something that has led to its wider celebration within the Episcopal Church.

=== Reformed churches ===
The Continental Reformed churches, such as the Christian Reformed Church in North America, assign the following hymns to be used on the Feast of Christ the King: "Crown Him with Many Crowns", "Lo! He comes with clouds descending", and "Rejoice, the Lord Is King".

In the Presbyterian Churches, such as the Presbyterian Church (USA), at the Feast of Christ the King (Feast of the Reign of Christ) "the church gives thanks and praise for sovereignty of Christ, who is Lord of all creation and is coming again in glory to reign (see Revelation 1:4-8)."

In the United Church of Christ, a Congregationalist denomination, the Feast of Christ the King is the last Sunday of the liturgical season known as the Time of the Church.

=== Methodist churches ===
The Feast of Christ the King is observed in the Methodist churches, such as the United Methodist Church, as the last Sunday of the Season after Pentecost. The Season after Pentecost itself starts on Trinity Sunday and culminates in the Feast of Christ the King. Some Methodist congregations have been named Christ the King.

=== United Protestant Churches ===
In United Protestant churches, such as the United Church of Canada, Uniting Church of Australia, Church of North India, Church of Pakistan and Church of South India, the Feast of Christ the King (Reign of Christ), is observed as the last Lord's Day of the liturgical calendar.

== See also ==
- Stir-up Sunday
- List of things named after Christ the King
