= Pentecost season =

Liturgical season

Pentecost season, also known Pentecostide, as well as the time of Sundays after Pentecost or Sundays after Trinity, is a liturgical period, celebrated by some Christian churches, which immediately follows the Easter season. Although the start and end dates vary by liturgical tradition, the season typically begins on the day of Pentecost and continues throughout the rest of the liturgical year, ending just before the season of Advent. The liturgical color for this period is typically green or red.

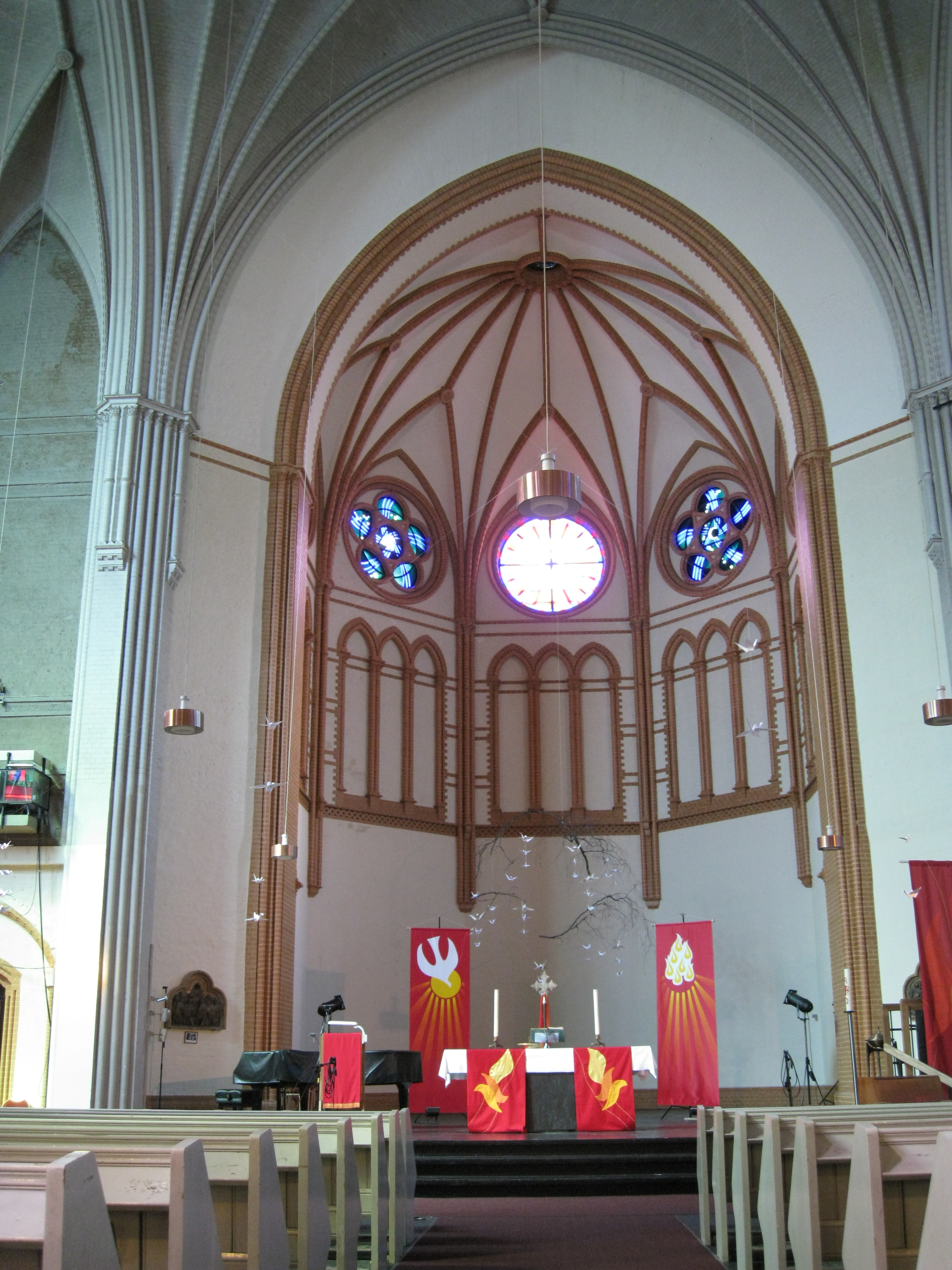
Red is the liturgical colour assigned to Pentecost Sunday, the first day of the Pentecost season in Western Christianity; depicted is the chancel of Lutherkirche in the German city of Schöneberg.

== Western Christianity ==
=== Roman Rite ===
The Ordinary Form of the Roman Rite of the Catholic Church does not include a Pentecost season. Pentecost is considered the last day of the Easter season, and is followed by Ordinary Time.

Traditionalist Catholicism has an eight-day Octave of Pentecost, followed by Sundays after Pentecost that continue through to the end of the liturgical year.

The Catholic Church's Ordinariate Use for former Anglicans uses Trinity Sunday (the octave day of Pentecost) as the start of a liturgical period, with subsequent Sundays designated "Sundays after Trinity".

The various forms of the Roman Rite all use the color green for this period.

=== Moravianism ===
In the Moravian Church, the Pentecost season runs from the Feast of Pentecost itself to the Reign of Christ, the last Sunday of the liturgical year. Red is the liturgical color used for Pentecost Sunday; white is the liturgical color used for Trinity Sunday and Reign of Christ Sunday; green is the liturgical color used for the other Sundays of the Pentecost season.

=== Lutheranism ===
In the Lutheran Church–Missouri Synod, this period can be called "Season after Pentecost" or "Season of the Holy Trinity."

=== Anglicanism ===
In classical prayer books around the world, it is referred to as Trinitytide, "Season of Trinity", or just "Sundays after Trinity"

In The Episcopal Church the Book of Common Prayer refers to this period as the "Season after Pentecost."

=== Reformed ===
In the Reformed Churches, such as the Presbyterian Church (USA), the season is known as the "Time after Pentecost".

The United Church of Christ, a Congregationalist denomination in the Reformed tradition, assigns the period of the liturgical calendar as "Time after Pentecost".

=== Methodism ===
Many Annual Conferences within the United Methodist Church observe Kingdomtide as a liturgical season spanning the latter portion of the period between Pentecost and the start of the Advent season.

== Eastern Christianity ==
=== Byzantine Rite ===
The Byzantine Rite of Eastern Christianity uses the nomenclature of "Sundays after Pentecost."

=== West Syriac Rite ===
The Maronite Church, which uses the West Syriac Rite, celebrates a Pentecost season that extends until the Feast of the Exaltation of the Cross.

=== East Syriac Rite ===
The closest equivalent to a Pentecost season in the East Syriac Rite is the Season of Apostles, which begins with Pentecost and continues for seven weeks.
