= Commemoration (liturgy) =

Recital of one celebration within another in Catholic liturgy

In the Latin liturgical rites of the Catholic Church, a commemoration is the recital, within the Liturgy of the Hours or the Mass of one celebration, of part of another celebration that is generally of lower rank and impeded because of a coincidence of date.

== Parts used in commemorating ==
The parts commemorated are readings, antiphons, and prayers.

In the Liturgy of the Hours, all three are or have been used: a reading of the commemorated celebration in Matins (Office of Readings); the antiphons of the Benedictus in Lauds and of the Magnificat in Vespers; and the proper prayer of the celebration being commemorated, the same as the collect of its Mass.

In Mass, the prayers used are the collect, the prayer over the offerings and the prayer after Communion.

Furthermore, before the decree Cum nostra hac aetate of 1955, in the Liturgy of the Hours the verse of the short responsory in Prime and the doxology of hymns of a commemorated feast that had special ("proper") forms of these were used, as in Mass were the commemorated feast's preface, if "proper", and the Credo, if the commemorated feast required its recitation.

== History ==
Originally there were no commemorations in Mass. The older sacramentaries have only one collect. Even when, in the ninth century, priests began elsewhere to say more than one collect, only one was used in Rome. However, even in Rome the number of collects gradually increased.

=== After the Council of Trent ===
Pope Pius V promulgated official editions of the Roman Breviary in 1568 and the Roman Missal in 1570 pursuant to the request of the Council of Trent. These admitted of several commemorations on the same day. Thus, on 29 December the liturgy celebrated was that of Saint Thomas Becket with commemorations of the Octaves of Christmas, Saint Stephen, Saint John the Apostle, and the Holy Innocents. (See Tridentine calendar.)

Complicated rules governed such commemorations. The section De Commemorationibus in the Rubricae generales Missalis in later editions of the Missal of Pope Pius V begins by stating that "Commemorations occur at Mass as in the Office. A Double or Semidouble Feast commemorated as a Simple in the Office is commemorated also at Mass, including Solemn Mass on Class II Double Feasts, but excluding Palm Sunday and the Vigil of Pentecost. A Simple Feast is commemorated at Mass, if in the Office it was commemorated in First Vespers; but if it was commemorated only at Lauds, it is not commemorated at a Solemn Mass but only in private Masses. Exceptions again are Palm Sunday and the Vigil of Pentecost, at which no commemoration is made even at private Masses of an occurring Simple Feast, even if it was commemorated in the Office. A commemoration is made of a Sunday on which a Double Feast is celebrated. An Octave is commemorated on a Feast celebrated within it, unless the Feast in question is one of those excepted in the Rubric on Commemorations in the Breviary. So too when a Sunday is celebrated within an Octave." This was the first of eight subsections of the rubric of the Roman Missal regarding commemorations.

A multiplicity of prayers had become so normal that even in Masses without any commemoration other prayers were added. The complicated rules in their regard were given in the seventeen subsections of the section De Orationibus of the Rubricae generales Missalis. This practice was abolished in 1955 under Pope Pius XII.

Pope Pius X amended both De Commemorationibus and De Orationibus in 1910, as indicated in his Additiones et Variationes in Rubricis Missalis.

The conclusion "Per Dominum nostrum ..." ("Through our Lord ...") or its variants were added only to the first and final prayers.

=== Reduction of the mid-20th century ===
By the decree Cum nostra hac aetate (De rubricis ad simpliciorem formam redigendis) of 23 March 1955 Pope Pius XII reduced the feasts previously of Simple rank to commemorations in the Office and Mass of the feast day or feria on which they occurred. He considerably simplified the practice of commemorations. The relevant rules were made uniform for both Mass and the Liturgy of the Hours. The basis for some of the previous distinctions was removed by decreeing that feasts, except those of the first and second classes, would no longer, in line with the tradition of Jewish origin that counts sunset as the start of a new day, begin with First Vespers. Commemoration was always to be made of Sundays, First-Class Feasts, Ferias of Advent and Lent, the September Ember Days, and the Major Litanies. Other commemorations were admitted on condition that the number of prayers should never exceed three. The verse of the short responsory in Prime and the doxology of hymns of a commemorated feast that had special ("proper") forms of these were no longer to be used in the Liturgy of the Hours, nor were the preface (if "proper") of the commemorated feast and the Credo, if the commemorated feast had a right to it, to be used in Mass.

Five years later, the Code of Rubrics, which was composed by the same commission that had prepared the decree Cum nostra hac aetate, added little. It distinguished between privileged commemorations, i. e. those that in Cum nostra hac aetate were always to be made, with the addition of days within the Octave of Christmas, and ordinary commemorations. Privileged commemorations were to be made in Lauds and Vespers and all Masses, ordinary commemorations only in Lauds and conventual and low Masses. It also limited ordinarily to First-Class Feasts the celebration of First Vespers.

=== After the Second Vatican Council ===
The Liturgy of the Hours and Roman Missal as revised after the Second Vatican Council have greater flexibility on most days of the year, allowing a choice between several celebrations, each making no mention of any other alternative celebration.

Only a few saints are classified in the General Roman Calendar as solemnities or feasts; the remainder are memorials, most of them optional. On optional memorials, Mass may be of the weekday (feria) or of one of the saints listed as optional memorials or of any saint inscribed in the Roman Martyrology for that day. The choice is more limited on the weekdays of Advent from 17 to 24 December, on the days within the Octave of Christmas, and on the weekdays of Lent. On those days the Mass of the current liturgical day must be used, but the collect may be taken from a memorial of the day, except on Ash Wednesday and during Holy Week.

The Liturgy of the Hours as revised by Pope Paul VI and promulgated in 1970 prescribes that on the days when in Mass the collect is the only part of a memorial that may be used one may:

- after the patristic reading with its responsory from the proper of the season in the Office of Readings, add the proper hagiographical reading with a responsory and conclude with the prayer of the saint;
- after the concluding prayer in Lauds and Vespers, add the antiphon (proper or else from the common) and prayer of the saint.

This optional arrangement on such days in Mass and in the Liturgy of the Hours has obvious similarities with the earlier arrangements concerning commemorations.

On other days, the impeded celebration is simply omitted, unless it is a solemnity, in which case it is transferred to the next free day. It is not commemorated within the higher ranked celebration.

== See also ==
- Calendar of saints
- Liturgical reforms of Pope Pius XII
- Liturgical year
- Ranking of liturgical days in the Roman Rite
