= Ranking of liturgical days in the Roman Rite =

Regulation for the liturgy of the Roman Catholic church

The ranking of liturgical days in the Roman Rite is a regulation for the liturgy of the Catholic Church. It determines for each liturgical day which observance has priority when liturgical dates and times coincide (or "occur"), which texts are used for the celebration of the Holy Mass and the Liturgy of the Hours and which liturgical color is assigned to the day or celebration.

== Ranks ==
Each day in the Catholic liturgical calendar has a rank. The five basic ranks for the Ordinary Form of the Roman Rite, in descending order of importance, are as follows:

- Solemnity — the highest ranking type of feast day. It commemorates an event in the life of Jesus or Mary, or celebrates a Saint important to the whole Church or the local community. The Mass of a solemnity has proper readings and prayers, the Gloria and Credo are recited, and occasionally there will be use of incense, a processional hymn and procession, and a recessional hymn/recession. Outside of Advent, Lent and Eastertide, a solemnity falling on a Sunday is celebrated in place of the Sunday. The equivalent type in the older Tridentine or Extraordinary Form of the Roman Rite and the 1962 Missal of Pope John XXIII would be a I Class Feast.
- Feast — the rank of secondary liturgical days including lesser events in the life of Jesus, Mary or an Apostle (theologically speaking) or for major saints. The Gloria is recited but not the Credo, and there are proper readings and prayers for the feast. A Feast pertaining to the Lord (e.g. Transfiguration) falling on a Sunday during Ordinary Time replaces the Sunday Liturgy and such will have the Credo recited at Mass. The equivalent in the older Tridentine or Extraordinary Form of the Roman Rite and the 1962 Missal of Pope John XXIII would be a II Class Feast.
- Memorial — the commemoration of a saint of lesser importance. Many memorials are optional or only observed in specific dioceses, regions or nations. The equivalent in the Extraordinary Form would be a III Class Feast.
- Seasonal Weekday — a weekday in Advent, Christmastide, Lent, or Eastertide, on which no solemnity, feast, or memorial happens to be observed. On Weekdays of Lent memorials are celebrated as optional memorial and such liturgy of Lent shall be used. The equivalent in the Extraordinary Form would be I, II and III Class Ferial days, and the even older Tridentine forms would be classified as Major Ferials.
- Feria or Ferial Weekday — a weekday in Ordinary Time on which no solemnity, feast or memorial happens to be observed. The equivalent in the Extraordinary Form would be a IV Class Ferial, and in the older Tridentine forms would be Minor Ferials.

All holy days of obligation on a global level are also solemnities; however, not all solemnities are holy days of obligation. For example, The Nativity of the Lord Jesus (Christmas) (25 December) is a solemnity which is always a holy day of obligation, whereas the Nativity of Saint John the Baptist (24 June) is not a holy day of obligation. On a local level, the reverse is also possible, e.g., in Germany the (global) feast of St. Stephen (26 December) is a holy day of obligation, without being raised to solemnity.

== History ==
The ranking of feast days of saints and of Christian mysteries such as the Ascension of the Lord, which had grown from an original division between doubles and simples.

What the original meaning of the term "double" may have been is not entirely certain. Some think that the greater festivals were thus styled because the antiphons were "doubled" at the major hours, i.e. they were repeated twice. Others, with more probability, point to the fact that before the ninth century in certain places, for example at Rome, it was customary on the greater feast days to recite two sets of Matins, the first for the week-day, the second for the feast. Hence such days were known as "doubles".

The Catholic Encyclopedia of 1907 shows the incremental crowding of the calendar with the following table based on the official revisions of the Roman Breviary in 1568, 1602, 1631 and 1882, and on the situation in 1907:

Pope	Date	Doubles, I Class	Doubles, II Class	Greater Doubles	Doubles	Semidoubles	Total
Pius V	1568	19	17	0	53	60	149
Clement VIII	1602	19	18	16	43	68	164
Urban VIII	1631	19	18	16	45	78	176
Leo XIII	1882	21	18	24	128	74	275
Pius X	1907	23	27	25	133	72	280

In 1907, when, in accordance with the rules in force since the time of Pope Pius V, feast days of any form of double, if impeded by "occurrence" (falling on the same day) with a feast day of higher class, were transferred to another day, this classification of feast days was of great practical importance for deciding which feast day to celebrate on any particular day.

Pope Pius X changed things considerably in his 1911 reform of the Roman Breviary. Further retouches were made by Pope Pius XII in 1955.

A major revision was done by Pope John XXIII in 1960, which divided the days into four classes: the previous major and minor doubles and semidoubles became feasts of the III class, and the previous simples had already in 1955 been reduced to commemorations within a (IV class) feria. It is this form that was authorized to use in the motu proprio Summorum pontificum; for those who follow this use, the decree Cum sanctissima by the CDF in 2020 in effect created a new class of feasts: while most feasts of the III class can now, on a voluntary basis, be replaced by the celebration of newer saints, a special number of important ones cannot, and these in turn can be celebrated in Lent and Passiontide again (which in 1955/60 had been forbidden for III class feasts). For details, see the respective calendars.

The 1969 revision by Pope Paul VI divided feast days into "solemnities" (the previous I class feasts), "feasts" (the previous II class feasts) and "memorials" (the previous III class feasts), and entirely did away with the practice of commemorations as hitherto known. In the memorials, it introduced a new distinction between obligatory and optional memorials: An optional memorial means that the celebrant (or who prays the Office) can choose between one or more memorials and the feria.

== Sundays ==
The office of Sunday originally was generally semidouble. The only exception was Low Sunday which was a double; the further of Easter and Pentecost were counted not as Sundays but as feasts, and were the only feasts with the privilege of entirely replacing a Sunday.

A division of the Sundays into major and minor ones - corresponding to what Pope John XXIII's Code of Rubrics would call I and II class - was very ancient. Apart from Low Sunday, the major ones were those of Advent (4), Shrovetide (3), Lent (4) and Passiontide (2), with all the others being minor. Major Sundays gave way to no feast except I class doubles, with some very few (1st of Advent, 1st of Lent, Passion Sunday, Palm Sunday and Low Sunday) outranking even them. Minor Sundays were preferred over all other semidouble occasions, but gave way to any double feast (!). Some Sundays also had feasts perpetually assigned to it, such as The Trinity (1st after Pentecost) or The Rosary (1 October). (The practical effect of the latter two facts, especially the first of these, was that such Sundays only rarely did not give way to some feast. - The surprising fact that Eastertide Sundays were, apart from the first, not ranked as major has probably the reason that the abstention of having saints-feasts was seen as a sign of a penitential season.) However, when a Sunday was thus outranked, it was always commemorated, generally at Lauds, Vespers and Mass after the prayer of the day, and by having its Gospel as Last Gospel of the Mass.

The reform by Pope Pius X (1911) made a systematically rather small change here which had very much effect: from now on, even minor Sundays would outrank minor doubles, and also major doubles if they were not feasts of the Lord. (But a Sunday would still give way to, say, the feast of St. Anne, because she had a II class double.)

In 1955, Pope Pius XII initiated a major revision here. All Sundays were raised to the double rite; all major ones – except those of Shrovetide, which thus were effectively demoted to minor – outrank all feasts whatsoever, and all minor Sundays give way to only feasts of the first class and of the Lord – and if they gave way to a feast of the Lord (whether also of the first class, or not), they would be entirely replaced by it, i.e. not commemorated.

In the 1960 reform by Pope John XXIII, the major Sundays were branded such of the first class and the minor ones such of the second, with the Shrovetide Sundays now officially demoted. However, the Feast of the Immaculate Conception would outrank Advent II once more. Furthermore, though this does not concern the rank, the content of the Sunday Office was reduced to what in previous times would have been called that of a simple-feast, with only three lessons at Matins, and only the last of those being of the Sunday Gospel.

As far as the ranks are concerned, there was rather little change in the liturgy reform: The Sundays of Shrovetide fell away, though, and as in 1955-1960 Advent II would again outrank the Immaculate Conception.

== Ferias ==
Originally, the division of ferias was into the two categories of:

- major ferias: all ferias of Advent, Lent including Passiontide, Ember Days, Rogation Monday, and the Friday before Pentecost,
- minor ferias: all others.

The major ferias would outrank simple-feasts, while the minor ones give way to them. However, as almost every feast was at least a semidouble, and even Ember Days would give way to semidoubles, the distinguishing characteristic was rather something else: The major ferias would be commemorated when so replaced; the minor ones would not. - Only Ash Wednesday and the days of Holy Week were privileged, so that their office must be taken, no matter what feast might occur.

Pope John XXIII, in his reform, in addition to his division of festal days and Sundays, distinguished the major ferias into three categories, so that we have:

- First-class ferias: Ash Wednesday and all the weekdays of Holy Week. These, previously the privileged ferias, continued to outrank all feasts.
- Second-class ferias: ferias of Advent from 17 December to 23 December, and Ember Days:. These would give way to first-class feasts, and also to global second-class feasts, but not to local ones.
- Third-class ferias (upper half): other ferias of Lent. These would give way to all feasts of the first and second class, but outrank all third-class feasts.
- Third-class ferias (lower half): other ferias of Advent. These were outranked by all (remaining) feasts.
- Fourth-class ferias: all others, including Rogation Monday and Friday before Pentecost.

Ferias of the second and third class would, again, be commemorated; this, and the Votive Masses allowed, constitute the difference between ferias of Advent and fourth-class ferias. - The 2020 decree Cum sanctissima, as mentioned above, allowed some third-class feasts to be celebrated in Lent again on a voluntary basis.

The liturgy reform did away with Ember Days as a liturgical celebrations (though there are suggestions of making certain Ember-Week prayers in some specific weeks of the year) and with commemorations, and assigned specific masses to days of Advent and Eastertide (which they previously had not had), and specific Scripture readings to the remaining fourth-class ferias. As far as the ranking is concerned, the division of Pope John XXIII, however, remains essentially unchanged.

== Vigils ==
In early times, every feast had a vigil, but the increase in the number of feasts and abuses connected with the evening and night service of which the vigils originally consisted, led to their diminishment. Nevertheless, the Roman Rite kept many more vigils than other Latin liturgical rites such as the Ambrosian Rite and the Mozarabic Rite, and if they fell on a Sunday transferred them to the previous Saturday.

In the Tridentine calendar, there were initially seventeen vigils (excluding The Vigil of Easter on Holy Saturday morning), divided into "major vigils" and "minor" or "common vigils". Christmas, the Epiphany and Pentecost comprised the major vigils. The common vigils included the Ascension of Our Lord, Saint John the Baptist, the Assumption of the Blessed Virgin Mary and All Saints. Most feasts of the Apostles also had vigils, namely Saints Andrew, Thomas, James, Simon and Jude. Whilst the vigils of the Immaculate Conception, Saints Peter and Paul, Saint Lawrence, Saint Bartholomew and Saint Matthew remained, they soon came to be impeded by higher-ranking feasts added to the calendar, and they were instead commemorated as part of other Masses rather than observed in their own right. The Vigil of St. Matthias was unique, in that it was normally commemorated on 23 February, the feast of St. Peter Damian, but in leap years was kept on 24 February, the leap day of the Roman calendar.

Pope Pius XII divided Vigils into only two classes: "privileged vigils" (Christmas and Pentecost) and "common vigils" (Ascension of Our Lord, Assumption of the Blessed Virgin Mary, Saint John the Baptist, Saints Peter and Paul, Saint Lawrence). All other vigils, even those in local calendars, were suppressed. The vigils of Saints Peter and Paul and Saint Lawrence, however, continued to be impeded by higher-ranking feasts.

In Pope John XXIII's 1960 Code of Rubrics, Vigils were divided into three classes. The Easter Vigil was left out of the calculations, being celebrated in a different way from that of other Vigils. The Vigils of Christmas and Pentecost were of the I class, and took precedence over any feast with which they might coincide. The II class Vigils were those of the Ascension of Our Lord, the Assumption of the Blessed Virgin Mary, Saint John the Baptist, and Saints Peter and Paul; they took precedence over liturgical days of III or IV class. The only III class Vigil was that of Saint Lawrence, which took precedence only over liturgical days of IV class.

== Octaves ==
The Tridentine calendar had many octaves, without any indication in the calendar itself of distinction of rank between them, apart from the fact that the Octave Day (the final day of the octave) was ranked higher than the days within the octave. Several octaves overlapped, so that, for instance, on 29 December the prayer of the saint of the day, Saint Thomas Becket, was followed by the prayers of Christmas Day, of Saint Stephen, of Saint John the Evangelist and of the Holy Innocents. The situation remained such until the reform of Pope Pius X.

In Pope Pius XII's reform, only the octaves of Christmas, Easter and Pentecost were kept. The days within the Easter and Pentecost octaves were raised to double rite, had precedence over all feasts, and did not admit commemorations.
