= Reign of Christ =

Reign of Christ can refer to:

- Feast of Christ the King - a last holy Sunday in the western liturgical calendar, celebrated by the Catholic Church and by some Protestants.
- De Regno Christi - a work by Martin Bucer
