= Whit Monday =

Holiday celebrated the day after Pentecost

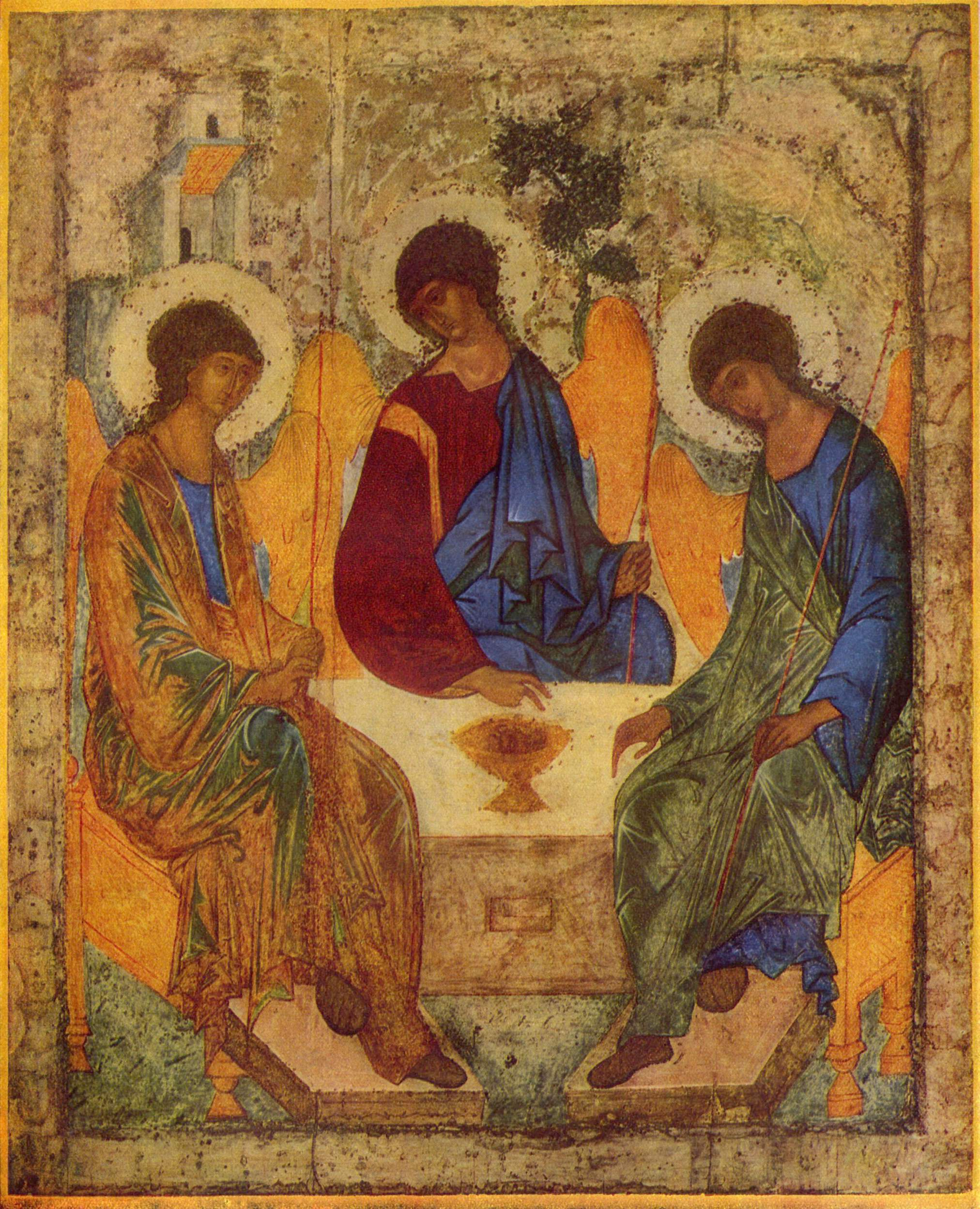
- Medieval Russian icon of the Old Testament Trinity by Andrei Rublev, used as the icon of the feast for Whit Monday.
- Also called: Pentecost Monday (Western), Monday of the Holy Spirit (Eastern)
- Observed by: Many European countries, and some former colonies
- Type: Christian, Public
- Begins: 1st Monday after Whit Sunday
- Date: Easter + 50 days
- 2025 date: June 9 (Western); June 9 (Eastern)
- 2026 date: May 25 (Western); June 1 (Eastern)
- 2027 date: May 17 (Western); June 21 (Eastern)
- 2028 date: June 5 (Western); June 5 (Eastern)
- Frequency: Annual
- Related to: Whit Sunday, Whit Tuesday, Whit Friday, Trinity Sunday

Whit Monday or Pentecost Monday, also known as Monday of the Holy Spirit, is the holiday celebrated the day after Pentecost, a moveable feast in the Christian liturgical calendar. It is moveable because it is determined by the date of Easter. In the Catholic Church, it is the Memorial of the Blessed Virgin Mary, Mother of the Church, marking the resumption of Ordinary Time.

Whit Monday gets its name from "Whitsunday", an English name for Pentecost, one of the three baptismal seasons. The origin of the name "Whit Sunday" is generally attributed to the white garments formerly worn by those newly baptised on this feast.

== Observance ==
Pentecost is always on a Sunday and is therefore usually a non-working day. The Monday after Pentecost is a public holiday in: Andorra, Antigua and Barbuda, Anguilla, Austria, the Bahamas, Barbados, Belgium, Benin, The British Virgin Islands, Central African Republic, Republic of Congo, Cyprus, Denmark, Dominica, France, Gabon, Germany, Greece, Grenada, Hungary, Iceland, Ivory Coast, Liechtenstein, Luxembourg, Madagascar, Monaco, Montserrat, The Netherlands, Norway, Romania, Saint Lucia, Saint Kitts and Nevis, Saint Vincent and the Grenadines, Senegal, Solomon Islands, Switzerland, Togo and Ukraine. In many of these countries, Whit Monday is known as "the second day of Pentecost" or "the second Whitsun".

Whit Monday was a bank holiday in the United Kingdom up until 1964. From 1965 to 1970 it was moved to the last Monday in May on a trial basis. It was then formally replaced by the fixed Spring Bank Holiday on the last Monday in May in 1971. Until 1973, Whit Monday was a public holiday in Ireland. It was formally replaced by the fixed June Bank Holiday on the first Monday in June in 1973. Whit Monday was a public holiday in various former British colonies, especially in the Pacific. It remains a public holiday in some of the countries of the Commonwealth Caribbean.

Whit Monday is not a public holiday in the United States, but some US churches organise Whit Monday prayer rallies, which include prayers and street marches. Historically, Whit Monday used to be one of the major annual holidays in Pennsylvania Dutch Country. From around 1835 to just after the Civil War, Whit Monday was referred to as the "Dutch Fourth of July" in Lancaster, Pennsylvania, where people came to eat, drink and be entertained. Whit Monday is not a public holiday in Australia, but church events which observe Whit Monday may include evening services, Bible group meetings, and Sunday school lessons which focus on teaching children about the origins and the meaning of Whit Monday and Whit Sunday.

In Germany, Whit Monday (German: Pfingstmontag [p͡fɪŋstˈmoːntaːk]) is a Holy Day of obligation for Roman Catholics. In France, Whit Monday became a work-day for many workers from 2005 to 2007. This was to raise extra funds following the government's lack of preparation for a summertime heat wave, which led to a shortage of proper health care for the elderly. It continues to be a "worked public holiday" in France. Whit Monday is celebrated in South Tyrol, and for its capital city Bolzano it replaces the holiday of the local patron saint celebrated elsewhere in Italy. In Sweden, Whit Monday was a public holiday until 2004; it was replaced by the National Day of Sweden in 2005.

Although Whit Monday is a civil holiday in many countries, it was not a Catholic religious holiday any more than the other weekdays which follow Pentecost Sunday. Until the 1969 revision of the General Roman Calendar, they were part of the octave of Pentecost, which was added in the 7th century. The Monday after Pentecost is now the first day of the resumption of Ordinary Time. While the details differ from diocese to diocese, the most widespread practice in Germany (where the holiday remains an obligation) was to have a compulsory votive Mass of the Holy Spirit, outranking even solemnities (these would be local solemnities in that case).

However, in February 2018, Pope Francis declared that henceforth, Whit Monday will be the fixed date for the celebration of a new feast, officially known as the "Memorial of Mary, Mother of the Church" to be celebrated throughout the Western Catholic Church, with the exception of the Ordinariates, where the octave of Whitsun Week has been restored, and the new Memorial is observed on the Saturday after Ascension Day.

=== Observance in Eastern Orthodoxy and the Eastern Catholic Churches ===
In the Eastern Orthodox Church and the Eastern Catholic Churches Whit Monday is known as "Monday of the Holy Spirit" or "Day of the Holy Spirit". It is the first day of the afterfeast of Pentecost, being dedicated specifically to the honour of God the Holy Spirit, and particularly in commemoration of His descent upon the apostles at Pentecost. The day following is known as the Third Day of the Trinity. In services on the Monday of the Holy Spirit many of the same hymns are sung as on the day of Pentecost itself. During the Divine Liturgy the Deacon intones the same introit as on the day of Pentecost, and the dismissal is the same as on the day of Pentecost. Special canons to the Holy Spirit are chanted at Compline and Matins.

== See also ==
- Azores Day
