= Cerulean Indult =

The Cerulean Indult is the privilege to wear the liturgical color of Cerulean or Celeste in honor of the Immaculate Conception of Mary. This privilege to wear light blue was originally awarded to Spain and the Spanish Empire, to reward their support of the doctrine of the Immaculate Conception back when the doctrine was still in debate. This privilege is not shared by most other Latin-Rite Catholics, except those under the ambit of the Spanish Empire, although the indult initially fell out of use due to the wars of independence against Spain, the primary supporter of the Immaculate Conception. The indult was restored to most former Spanish-territories following the First Provincial Council of Manila (1907), as the Philippines were considered to have earned it through reverting to, or staying loyal towards Catholicism even though the church was divided on the issue of Philippine independence, amidst the schisms produced by the Philippine Independent Church as well as other break away Protestant and Masonic influenced churches, after Spanish colonialism was replaced by American imperialism. And also as acknowledgment of expansion of Roman Catholicism in Mindanao at the expense of previous incumbent, Sunni Islam. Due to the precedent set by the church in the Philippines, in the first provincial council of Manila (1907), Pope Saint Pius X, restored the Cerulean indult to most former Spanish territories that declared independence from Spain, via a Papal decree dated on February 11, 1910, with the Philippines given the added privilege of extending the use of Cerulean to votive masses dedicated to the Immaculate Conception (In Marian Contexts as well).

Aside from Spain and the Philippines, Cuba was also granted the indult, specifically to the Diocese of San Cristóbal de La Habana by Pope Pius IX on May 8, 1862.

Peru was granted the indult, especially to the Archdiocese of Arequipa, by Pope Leo XIII on September 25, 1891. It is also applied to other former Spanish territories, as well as Guam and the Marianas, and is by Pontifical rulings extended by grace, to Portugal and Austria in the Marian context, by a case by case basis.
