= Ordinary Time =

Christian liturgical period

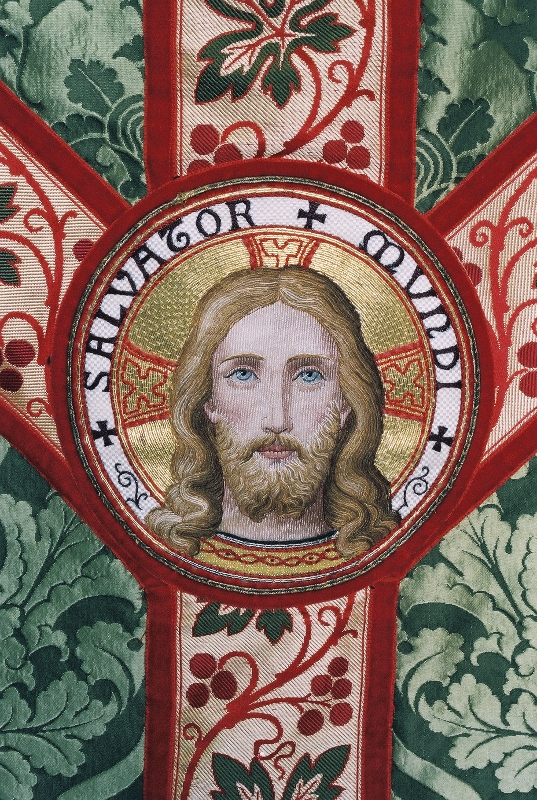
Green is the liturgical colour of Ordinary Time.

Ordinary Time (Latin: Tempus per annum) is the part of the liturgical year in the liturgy of the Roman Rite, which falls outside the two seasons of Christmastide and Eastertide, or their respective preparatory seasons of Advent and Lent. Ordinary Time thus includes the days between Christmastide and Lent, and between Eastertide and Advent. The liturgical color assigned to Ordinary Time is green. The last Sunday of Ordinary Time is the Solemnity of Christ the King.

Although the word "ordinary" as used here is commonly explained as deriving from the ordinal numerals by which the weeks are identified or counted, Foley disputes this explanation, noting the lack of ecclesiastical usage and documentary support.

== Roman Rite ==
In the ordinary form of the Roman Rite, the last day of Christmastide is the Sunday after the Solemnity of the Epiphany, or the Sunday after January 6 in places where the Epiphany is moved to always occur on a Sunday. Ordinary Time begins the following Monday, and the weekdays that follow are reckoned as belonging to the first week of Ordinary Time. The Feast of the Baptism of the Lord is usually celebrated on the last day of Christmas Time, but if it is displaced to Monday due to the Epiphany being celebrated on January 7 or 8, the Feast of the Baptism falls in Ordinary Time instead.

Because Ordinary Time begins on a Monday, there is no day called the "First Sunday in Ordinary Time". Instead, the lowest-numbered Sunday is called the Second Sunday in Ordinary Time. This block of Ordinary Time continues through the Tuesday that immediately precedes Ash Wednesday.

Ordinary Time resumes on the Monday after the Solemnity of Pentecost. The two Sundays following Pentecost are the Solemnity of the Most Holy Trinity and the Solemnity of the Most Holy Body and Blood of Christ, which despite being part of Ordinary Time, are not numbered. In regional calendars where Whitmonday is a Day of Obligation, Ordinary Time and the use of the liturgical color green may begin on the following Tuesday.

The last day of Ordinary Time is the day before the First Sunday of Advent. The last Sunday of Ordinary Time is the Solemnity of Christ the King, with the Sunday before that being the Thirty-Third Sunday in Ordinary Time, with the ordinal numbers counting backwards from that point.

Due to the configuration of the calendar year, Ordinary Time may have a total of either 33 or 34 weeks. As a mnemonic, if the First Sunday of Advent is in November, the previous liturgical year's Ordinary Time will have 33 weeks. If it falls on December 2 or 3, it will have 34 weeks. However, if it falls on December 1, the previous year's Ordinary Time will have 34 weeks only when it is a leap year. In a year where Ordinary Time has 33 weeks, the omitted week is the one between the weeks immediately surrounding Lent and Easter Time, which varies with the date of Easter. This is because the weeks always count forward from the first week at the beginning of Ordinary Time, and separately backwards from the thirty-fourth week at the end of Ordinary Time.

The decision to treat the whole of Ordinary Time as a unit led to abandonment of the previous terminology, whereby the Sundays of the first period were called Sundays after Epiphany and those of the second period Sundays after Pentecost.

=== Solemnities, feasts, and commemorations ===
The celebration of an Ordinary Time weekday gives way to that of any solemnity, feast, or obligatory memorial that falls on the same day, and may optionally be replaced by that of a non-obligatory memorial or of any saint mentioned in the Roman Martyrology for that day.

The solemnities, feasts, and commemorations of the General Roman Calendar which may, according to the Ranking of liturgical days in the Roman Rite, replace a Sunday of Ordinary Time are:

- Feast of the Presentation of the Lord on 2 February
- Solemnity of the Most Holy Trinity on the Sunday after Pentecost
- Solemnity of the Nativity of Saint John the Baptist on 24 June
- Solemnity of Saints Peter and Paul on 29 June
- Feast of the Transfiguration of the Lord on 6 August
- Solemnity of the Assumption of the Blessed Virgin Mary on 15 August
- Feast of the Exaltation of the Holy Cross on 14 September
- Solemnity of All Saints on 1 November
- Commemoration of All the Faithful Departed on 2 November
- Feast of the Dedication of the Basilica of Saint John Lateran in Rome on 9 November

The Universal Norms on the Liturgical Year and the General Roman Calendar also lists as proper solemnities (which outrank in the relevant church building or community Sundays in Ordinary Time):

- The Solemnity of the principal patron of the place, city, or state
- The Solemnity of the dedication and the anniversary of the dedication of one's own church
- The Solemnity of the title of one's own church
- The Solemnity either of the title or of the founder or of the principal Patron of an Order or Congregation.

== Revised Common Lectionary usage ==
Following the lead of the liturgical reforms of the Roman Rite, many Protestant churches also adopted the concept of an Ordinary Time alongside the Revised Common Lectionary, which applies the term to the period between Pentecost and Advent. However, use of the term is not common.

Those that have adopted the Revised Common Lectionary include churches of the Anglican, Methodist, Lutheran, Old Catholic and Reformed traditions.

Some Protestant denominations further distinguish a period at the end of Ordinary Time as Kingdomtide or Season of End Times. This period can range anywhere from only the three Sundays prior to Christ the King to 13 or 14 weeks (most notably in the United Methodist Church). The Church of England observes this time between All Saints and Advent Sunday.

In some traditions, what in the Roman Rite is the first period of Ordinary Time is called Epiphanytide (beginning on Epiphany Day in the Anglican Communion and Methodist churches) and from Trinity Sunday to Advent is called Trinitytide. In the Church of England, Sundays during "Ordinary Time" in this narrower sense are called "Sundays after Trinity", except the final four, which are termed "Sundays before Advent". In the Episcopal Church (United States), it is normal to use the older Catholic names in English of Sundays after Epiphany and Sundays after Pentecost (not Trinity).

The total number of Sundays varies according to the date of Easter and can range anything from 18 to 23. When there are 23, the Collect and Post-Communion for the 22nd Sunday are taken from the provision for the Third Sunday before Lent.

== See also ==
- Feria
