= June Holiday =

Public holiday in Ireland

- Also called: June Bank Holiday
- Observed by: Ireland
- Date: First Monday in June
- 2025 date: June 2
- 2026 date: June 1
- 2027 date: June 7
- 2028 date: June 5
- Frequency: Annual
- First time: 1974

In Ireland, the June Holiday (sometimes called the June Bank Holiday, Irish: Lá Saoire mhí an Mheithimh) is observed on the first Monday of June. It was previously observed as Whit Monday until 1973.

== See also ==
- Bank holiday
