= Liturgical colours =

Colours specified for certain religious feasts

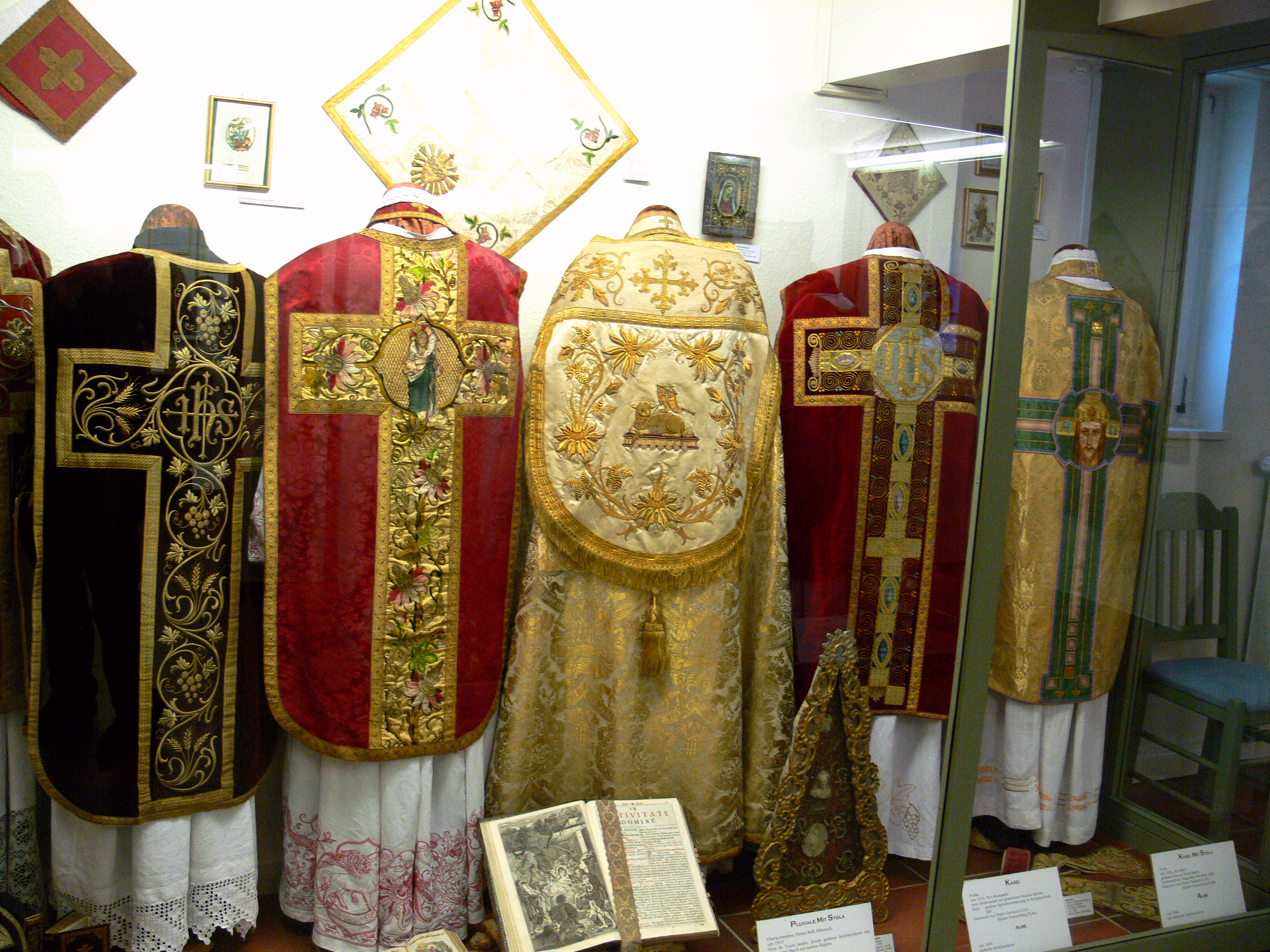
Vestments in different liturgical colours

Liturgical colours are specific colours used for vestments and hangings within the context of Christian liturgy. The symbolism of violet, blue, white, green, red, gold, black, rose, and other colours may serve to underline moods appropriate to a season of the liturgical year or may highlight a special occasion.

There is a distinction between the colour of the vestments worn by the clergy and their choir dress, which with a few exceptions does not change with the seasons of the liturgical year.

== Catholic Church ==
=== Historical information ===
The rules on liturgical colours before the time of Pope Pius X were essentially those indicated in the edition of the Roman Missal that Pope Pius V had promulgated in 1570, except for the addition of feasts not included in his Missal. The scheme of colours in his Missal reflected usage that had become fixed in Rome by the twelfth century.

Pius X raised the rank of the Sundays after Epiphany and Pentecost, so that on those that fell within common octaves, green was used instead of the colour of the octave, as had previously been the rule; on Sundays after Pentecost that fell within privileged octaves (i.e., the octaves of Corpus Christi and of the Sacred Heart), the liturgical colour of the feast was retained.

In its Constitution on the Sacred Liturgy, the Second Vatican Council referred only once to liturgical colours, stating that for funeral services, "the circumstances and traditions found in various regions" should be honoured.

=== Roman Rite ===
In the Roman Rite, the following colours are used, in accordance with the rubrics of the General Instruction of the Roman Missal (GIRM), Section 346. Bishop Conferences have approved local variations of the GIRM, and thus region deviations from the table below exist. For example, white is permitted to be used for funerals, Requiem Masses, and Offices for the Dead in the dioceses of America. The table shows what colours are used in the Bishops Conference of England and Wales:

Colour	Obligatory usage	Optional usage (in lieu of prescribed obligatory colour)
Green	Sundays and Ferias in Ordinary Time	
Violet	Sundays and Ferias of Advent; Sundays and Ferias in Lent; Liturgies on Holy Saturday (except for the Easter Vigil); Sacrament of Penance; All Souls' Day	Funerals, Requiem Masses, and Offices for the Dead
Rose		Gaudete Sunday (Third Sunday of Advent); Laetare Sunday (Fourth Sunday in Lent)
White	Christmastide (from [Vigil] of Christmas to the Baptism of the Lord); Holy Thursday; Easter season (from the Easter Vigil up to the Vigil of Pentecost); Solemnity of the Most Holy Trinity; Feasts of Our Lord other than those of His Passion; Marian feast days; Feasts of the Angels; Feasts of non-martyred saints or confessors; Feast of Saint John, Apostle and Evangelist; Feast of the Chair of Saint Peter; Feast of the Conversion of Paul the Apostle; The Nativity of St. John the Baptist; Solemnity of Saint Joseph; Other feasts of Saint Joseph; Feast of All Saints; Sacrament of Baptism; Sacrament of Matrimony; Sacrament of Holy Orders	Votive Masses and other Masses where Green is normally used.
Red	Palm Sunday; Good Friday; Pentecost; Feasts of the Passion of the Lord; Feasts of Martyrs, Apostles, and Evangelists; Passion of Saint John the Baptist; Sacrament of Confirmation; Funerals of Popes	
Black		All Souls' Day; Funerals, Requiem Masses, and Offices for the Dead

On solemnities, more precious vestments may be used, even if not exactly of the colour of the day. Such vestments may, for instance, be made from cloth of gold, silver, yellow, or golden brown. Moreover, the Conference of Bishops may determine and propose to the Holy See adaptations suited to the needs and culture of peoples.

There is no obligatory colour to be used for funerals, Requiem Masses, and Offices for the Dead, with either violet or, where it is the practice, black used.

Ritual Masses are celebrated in their proper colour or in white or in another festive colour. Masses for Various Needs, on the other hand, are celebrated in the colour proper to the day or the season or in violet if they bear a penitential character. Votive Masses are celebrated in the colour suited to the Mass itself or even in the colour proper to the day or the season.

==== Regional and situational exceptions ====
Some particular variations:

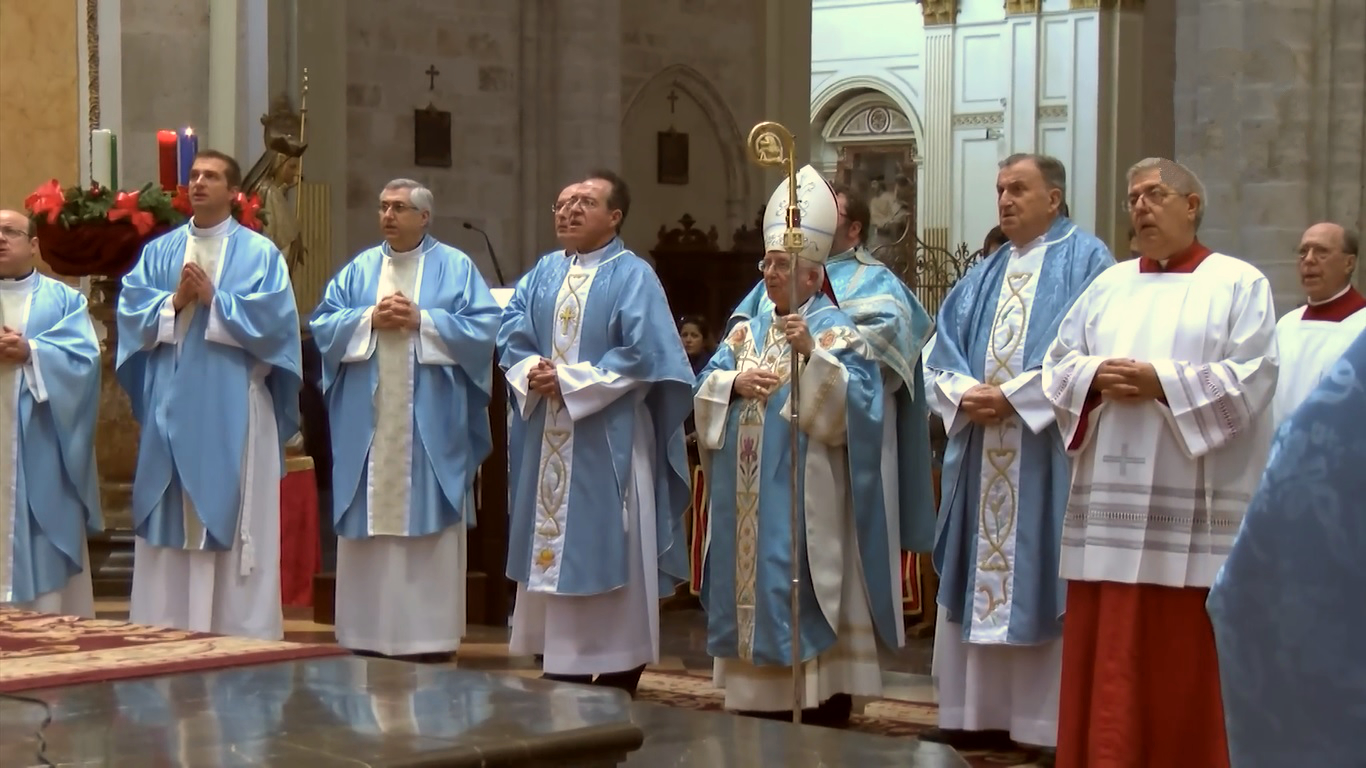
The Feast of the Immaculate Conception in Valencia Cathedral, 2014

- Blue, a colour associated with the Virgin Mary. While blue vestments are common in some Eastern churches, in the Latin rite, blue as a vestment colour may only be used pursuant to a special privilege granted. The permission, sometimes called "Cerulean Privilege", or "Cerulean Indult" is of two kinds: one pertains to particular Marian shrines and specifies when blue vestments may be worn. The other type of permission is that accorded to various countries. In Spain, an apostolic indult was granted for the feast of the Immaculate Conception and its octave as well as for votive Masses and Saturdays, when the Office for the Immaculate Conception is prayed and on Marian feasts where there is a related custom. The privilege has been granted to Spain, to certain of its colonies, and former colonies in Latin America by a decree of the Sacred Congregation of Rites on 12 February 1864. It also extends to the Philippines, Guam, and the Mariana Islands, which were still under Spanish rule at that time. The use of blue is also observed in Portugal during certain Marian feasts, although no special indult has been granted. There have also been uses of blue in place of violet for the season of Advent despite the fact that this practice is not authorized under liturgical rubrics.
- Gold or silver may be worn on more solemn occasions in the dioceses of the United States.

==== Permitted use of the 1960 Code of Rubrics ====
Observance of the rules on liturgical colours contained in the 1960 Code of Rubrics is still permitted in the circumstances indicated in the 2007 document Summorum Pontificum on use of the 1962 Roman Missal, which incorporates them. These rules differ from the current rubrics in the following respects:

Colour	1920–1955 usage	1956–1960 usage	1961–1969 usage
Violet	Ember days; Rogation days; Vigil of St. Andrew; Vigil of St. Thomas; Vigil of Christmas; Holy Innocents (when this falls on a weekday); Purification (Blessing of Candles and Procession); Vigil of St. Matthias (in leap years only); Septuagesima, Sexagesima, and Quinquagesima; Palm Sunday (Blessing of Palms, Procession, Mass); Holy Saturday (pre-Mass blessings and rites); Vigil of Pentecost (pre-Mass blessings and rites); Vigil of the Nativity of St. John the Baptist; Vigil of St. James; Vigil of the Assumption; Vigil of Sts. Simon and Jude; Vigil of All Saints; All Souls (during the Forty Hours' Devotion only); Sacrament of Baptism (Introductory rites and Exorcism)	Ember days; Rogation days; Vigil of Christmas; Holy Innocents (when this falls on a weekday); Purification (Blessing of Candles and Procession); Septuagesima, Sexagesima, and Quinquagesima; Palm Sunday (Mass only); Good Friday (Distribution of Holy Communion only); Easter Vigil (pre-Mass blessings and rites); Vigil of the Nativity of St. John the Baptist; Vigil of the Assumption; All Souls (during the Forty Hours' Devotion only); Sacrament of Baptism (Introductory rites and Exorcism)	Ember days; Rogation days; Vigil of Christmas; Septuagesima, Sexagesima, and Quinquagesima; Palm Sunday (Mass only); Good Friday (Distribution of Holy Communion only); Easter Vigil (pre-Mass blessings and rites); Vigil of the Nativity of St. John the Baptist; Vigil of Sts. Peter and Paul; Vigil of St. Lawrence; Vigil of the Assumption; All Souls (during the Forty Hours' Devotion only); Sacrament of Baptism (Introductory rites and Exorcism)
Rose	Gaudete Sunday; Laetare Sunday	Gaudete Sunday; Laetare Sunday	Gaudete Sunday; Laetare Sunday
White	Octave of the Immaculate Conception; Octave of St. John; Vigil of the Epiphany; Octave of the Epiphany; Octave of the Solemnity of St. Joseph; Vigil of the Ascension; Octave of the Ascension; Octave of Corpus Christi; Octave of the Sacred Heart; Octave of the Nativity of St. John the Baptist; Octave of the Assumption; Octave of All Saints; Sacrament of Confirmation	Vigil of the Ascension; Sacrament of Confirmation	Vigil of the Ascension; Sacrament of Confirmation
Red	Octave of St. Stephen; Octave of the Holy Innocents; Octave of Pentecost; Octave of Sts. Peter and Paul	Palm Sunday (Blessing of Palms and Procession); Octave of Pentecost	Palm Sunday (Blessing of Palms and Procession); Octave of Pentecost
Black	Good Friday; All Souls (except during the Forty Hours' Devotion); Requiem Masses	Good Friday (main liturgy); All Souls (except during the Forty Hours' Devotion); Requiem Masses	Good Friday (main liturgy); All Souls (except during the Forty Hours' Devotion); Requiem Masses

== Byzantine Rite ==
The Byzantine Rite, which is used by all the member churches of the Eastern Orthodox Church, the Byzantine Lutheran churches and the Eastern Catholic Churches of Byzantine Rite, does not have a universal system of colours, with the service-books of the Byzantine tradition only specifying "light" or "dark" vestments. In the Greek tradition, maroon or burgundy are common for solemn feast days, and a wide variety of colours are used at other times, the most common of which are gold and white.

Slavic-use churches and others influenced by Western traditions have adopted a cycle of liturgical colours. The particulars may change from place to place, but generally:

Colour	Common usage	Other usage
Gold	When no other colour is specified	
Light blue	Feasts of the Theotokos; Feasts of the Holy Archangels	Churches dedicated to the Theotokos may use light blue for the default, instead of gold.; In some places, blue is also used for Holy Theophany.; In many places, blue is used for the Dormition Fast (except from the Transfiguration to its afterfeast (August 6–13), when either gold or white is used).
Purple or wine-red	Saturdays and Sundays during Great Lent (Slavic churches)	In many places, purple or dark red are only worn on the weekdays of the Great Fast, while bright colours (gold, gold/white) are used on Saturdays and Sundays.
Red	Holy Thursday; Feast of the Cross; Beheading of St. John the Baptist; Feasts of Martyrs; Nativity Fast; Apostles' Fast	Pascha (Mount Athos and Jerusalem); Nativity (Mount Athos and Jerusalem); Feasts of the Holy Theotokos (Mount Athos); In some places, red is used for the Dormition Fast (except from the Transfiguration to its afterfeast (August 6–13), when either gold or white is used).
Green	Palm Sunday; Pentecost; Feasts of Venerable (Monastic) Saints	Feast of the Cross in some places (such as Jerusalem)
Black	Weekdays during Great Lent; Weekdays during Holy Week (except Holy Thursday)	Black is far more prevalent in the Slavic traditions than the Greek tradition, especially in the United States.
White	Pascha; Nativity; Theophany; Other Great Feasts of the Lord	Funerals (Throughout the year, even during Holy Week.)

The colours would be changed before Vespers on the eve of the day being commemorated. During Great Feasts, the colour is changed before the vespers service that begins the first day of a forefeast, and remains until the apodosis (final day of the afterfeast).

Under Western influence, black is often used in the Slavic churches for funerals, weekdays of Great Lent, and Holy Week as a sign of penance and mourning, but in the second half of the 20th century, the ancient white became more common, as a sign of the hope of the Resurrection.

=== Russian liturgical colours ===
In the tradition of the Russian Orthodox Church, up to nine different liturgical colours may be used throughout the year. Exact use of these colours varies, but the following are the most common uses:

Colour	Common use	Uncommon or other use
Yellow (желтый, zheltiy)	Feasts of the Lord Jesus Christ; Feasts of Prophets; Feasts of Apostles; Feasts of Holy Hierarchs; When no other colour is specified	
Light blue (голубой, goluboi)	Feasts of the Theotokos; Presentation of the Lord; Feast of the Annunciation; Feasts of Bodiless Powers; Feasts of Virgins	Fifth Friday in Lent; Dormition Fast until Elevation of the Cross, or even Advent (Carpatho-Russians)
Purple or Dark Red (фиолетовый, fioletoviy; темно-красный, temno-krasniy)	Cross of Our Lord; Great and Holy Thursday; Weekends of Lent	
Dark Blue, Indigo, Navy (синий, siniy; темно-синий, temno-siniy)	Weekends of Lent	
Red (красный, krasniy)	Feasts of Martyrs; Feast of Saints Peter and Paul; Advent; Feasts of Angels; Elevation of the Cross	Pascha (Mount Athos and Jerusalem); Nativity (Mount Athos and Jerusalem)
Green (зеленый, zelyeniy)	Palm Sunday; Pentecost; Holy Spirit Day; Feasts of Monastic Saints; Feasts of Ascetics; Feasts of Fools for Christ; Feasts of Prophets; Feasts of Angels	Pentecost until Saints Peter and Paul (Carpatho-Russians)
Black (черный, cherniy)	Weekdays of Lent	Weekday funerals, memorials, and liturgies (Carpatho-Russians)
White (белый, beliy)	Theophany; Transfiguration; Paschal season; Funerals	Theophany; Christmas Day
Orange (оранжевый, oranzheviy)		Saints Peter and Paul fast; Feast of Saints Peter and Paul until Transfiguration

== Coptic Rite ==
The Coptic tradition, followed by the Coptic Orthodox Church and the Coptic Catholic Church, only uses white vestments, with gold and silver being considered variations of white. The only exception is during Passion Week when black is used. Nonetheless, trimmings of red, gold or blue may be found on some vestments.

== Ethiopian Rite ==
The liturgical tradition of Ethiopia, followed by the Ethiopian Orthodox Church and the Ethiopian Catholic Church, embraces a wide variety of liturgical colours. In Eritrea, similar traditions are followed.

== Lutheran churches ==
The United Lutheran Church in America (ULCA), a predecessor of The Evangelical Lutheran Church in America (ELCA), prescribed the following colour scheme for its paraments in the Common Service Book (CSB) of 1917:

White from and with Vespers of the Eve of the Nativity through the Epiphany season (except the Day of St. Stephen, Martyr), from Easter Day to the Vespers of the Saturday before Whitsunday, on the Festival of the Transfiguration, on the Presentation of our Lord, on the Festival of the Holy Trinity and its Octave, on the Days of the Annunciation and the Visitation, and on the Day of St. Michael and All Angels.

Red from and with Vespers on the Saturday before Whitsunday to the Vespers of the Saturday before the Festival of the Holy Trinity, on the Festival of the Reformation and the Sunday after, on the Apostles' Days and on all Evangelists' Days (excepting St. John, Apostle, Evangelist), on Martyrs' Days, on All Saints' Day, for the Dedication of a Church, for all Church Anniversaries, for the Harvest Festival, and on Thanksgiving Day.

Green from and with Vespers of the Saturday before Septuagesima to Vespers of the day before Ash Wednesday, beginning with the second Sunday after the Festival of the Holy Trinity and throughout the Trinity Season to Vespers of the Saturday before Advent Sunday (except on such Festivals and Days for which there is a special appointment).

Violet from and with Vespers of the Saturday before Advent to Vespers of the Eve of the Nativity, from and with Vespers of the day before Ash Wednesday and throughout Lent (excepting Good Friday) to Vespers of the Eve of Easter.

Black for Good Friday and any Day of Humiliation called for by ecclesiastical authority.

This differs from the Roman and Anglican Uses in that it has white prescribed for the Epiphany Season, green for the period from Septuagesima until Lent, violet for Maundy Thursday, red for All Saints' Day, red for the Dedication of a Church and its annual anniversary, and red also for the Harvest Festival and Thanksgiving Day. One can presume that this is similar to the colour scheme historically used in the Protestant Church in Germany due to the heavy German influence in the ULCA.

Colour	Common usage	Other usage
White	Easter Sunday; Epiphanytide; Feast of the Transfiguration; Feast of the Holy Trinity; Feast of the Annunciation; Feasts of Angels	Maundy Thursday
Red	Vespers before Pentecost; Feasts of martyrs; Anniversaries	Reformation Day
Scarlet	Palm Sunday; Holy Monday; Holy Tuesday; Holy Wednesday; Maundy Thursday	
Green	Pre-lenten season; Trinity season	When no other colour is specified
Violet	Advent; Sundays of Lent	Holy Monday; Holy Tuesday; Holy Wednesday
Black	Good Friday	Ash Wednesday; Days of humiliation
Gold	Vigils before Easter	Easter (in some places)
Blue		Advent

The ELCA presently uses a similar colour scheme as that of their Scandinavian Lutheran counterparts, with the use of gold only for the Easter Vigil and Easter Sunday services and Holy Week using scarlet rather than crimson. Blue is used for Advent. White is used for Christmas, Epiphany, Sundays of Easter, Holy Trinity, and Christ the King. For Lent, purple is used. During the time after Pentecost and the Epiphany, green is used.

Both the Lutheran Church–Missouri Synod (LCMS) and the Wisconsin Evangelical Lutheran Synod (WELS) use a similar system, but with purple being the primary colour for both Advent and Lent (with blue being the alternate colour for Advent only), and the use of gold in place of white for both Christmas and Easter (in similar practice to the Catholic Church). In all three churches, including the ELCA, red is also worn on the last Sunday of October, in celebration of the Reformation on October 31, when Martin Luther nailed the 95 Theses onto the door of Wittenberg Castle Church.

== Anglicanism ==
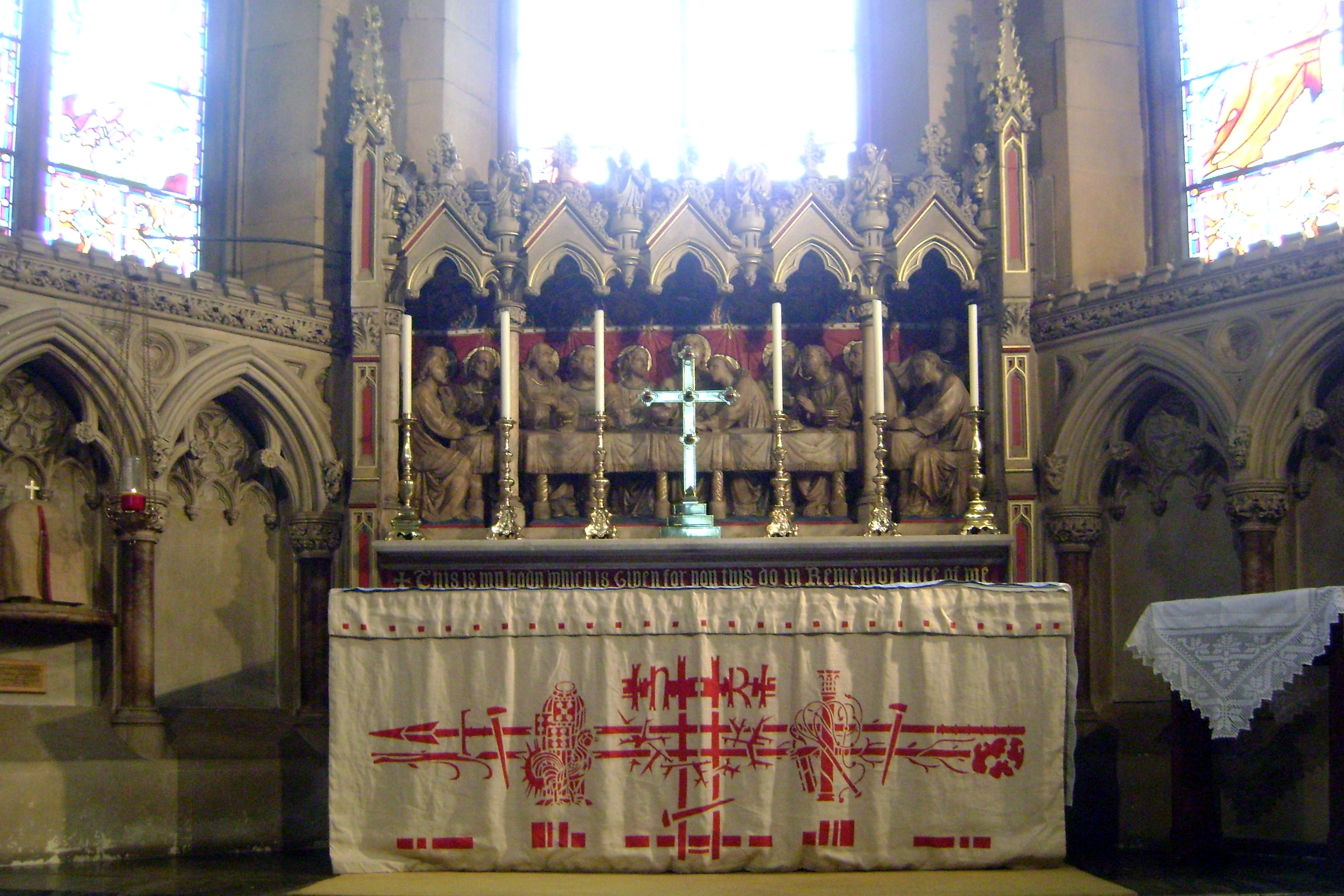
Lenten Array altar frontal by George Pace at St Augustine's, Edgbaston

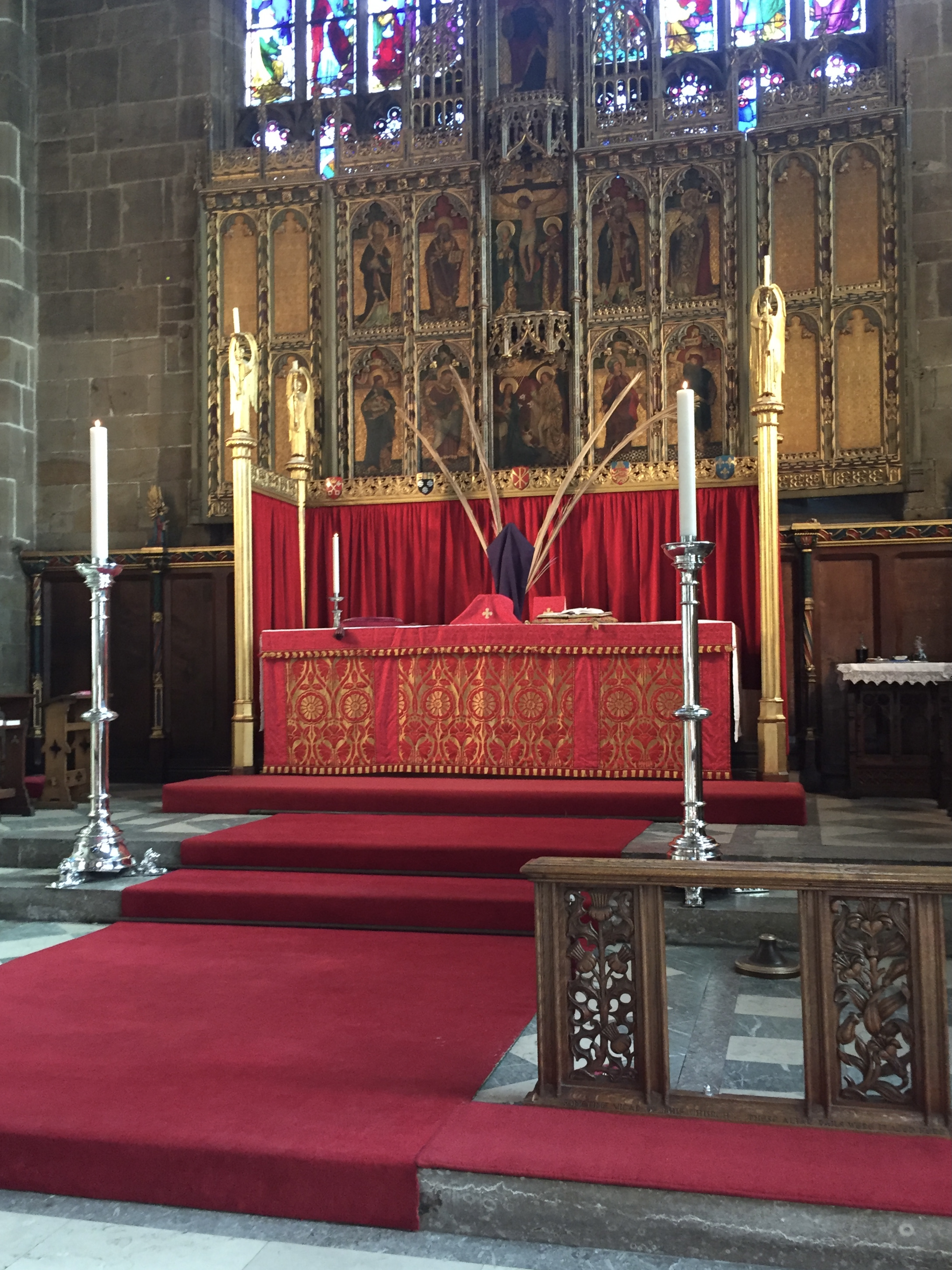
Red altar array on Palm Sunday in St Mary's Church, Nottingham

Most Anglican churches use the colours appointed in the Lutheran churches and those of the Roman Rite, usually in its post-1969 form, with the exception of Sarum Blue replacing violet for Advent, but some use the earlier form, with, for instance, black in place of red on Good Friday. Some churches use black at Masses for the dead, but more commonly white or purple is used. For historical reasons much of the worldwide Anglican Communion takes a noticeable lead from the practice of the Church of England. Since the 1980 Alternative Service Book, liturgical colours have been recommended for seasons, with more detailed advice offered as part of the Common Worship series of liturgies, including colours for all Sundays and festivals printed in the 'core volume' next to collects.

The Church's published Lectionary now makes detailed suggestions for liturgical colour throughout the year, which corresponds almost exactly with the above table of Roman Rite (post-1969 usage) usage with five minor exceptions, and one more significant one:

- there is no reference in Anglican usage to Masses of deceased popes and cardinals;
- no liturgical colour at all is suggested for Holy Saturday (the words "hangings removed" are printed);
- the recommendation of red for confirmation rites is extended also to ordination rites;
- Lenten Array (unbleached linen) continues to be listed as an alternative option to purple during Lent;
- the option exists for using red instead of green during the "Kingdom Season", the four last Sundays of the liturgical year, culminating in Christ the King, as is common is some Lutheran traditions (see above);
- finally, and more significantly, the Church of England provision suggests white throughout the Sundays after Epiphany as a distinct "Epiphany season", with ordinary time commencing the day after Candlemas.

The colour scheme suggested by the Church of England also indicates where gold vestments should be used in those churches that possess gold and white as distinct colours. The use of rose-pink vestments, as in the Roman Rite table above, was mentioned as an option in early editions of Common Worship, and is a listed option in the annual published lectionary; however, later Common Worship publications have begun to refer to this practice as "traditional" reflecting its resurgence.

=== Sarum Rite ===
The Sarum Rite was a medieval liturgical rite used in England before the Reformation which had a distinct set of liturgical colours. After the Anglo-Catholic Revival of the 19th century, certain Church of England churches began adopting Sarum liturgical colours as an attempt to produce something that was an English expression of Catholicism rather than a Roman expression. One of the chief advocates behind this was Percy Dearmer. The exact colours used by the mediaeval Sarum rite are a matter of dispute, but colours adopted by contemporary churches claiming to use the Sarum scheme include in particular deep blue for Advent, which may be popularly referred to as "Sarum blue", and unbleached linen for Lent.

== Methodist churches ==
Methodists who use liturgical colours follow a colour scheme similar to those used by Anglicans and Roman Catholics. The United Methodist Church, prior to the early 1990s, used red solely for Pentecost, even including the Sundays after Pentecost Sunday, with the use of green being reserved for the season of Kingdomtide, which usually lasted from late August/early September until Christ the King (the last Sunday in Kingdomtide). Since the publication of the 1992 Book of Worship, the UMC has followed the ELCA practice of wearing red only for Pentecost, Holy Week and Reformation Sunday and green for the rest of the Pentecost season.

== Reformed churches ==
The Presbyterian Church (USA), or its predecessor denominations, has sanctioned the use of liturgical colours and promoted their use in The Worshipbook of 1970, the 1993 Book of Common Worship and the 2018 Book of Common Worship. Advent and Lent are periods of preparation and repentance and are represented by the colour purple. Blue can be used for Advent instead of purple. The feasts of Christmas Day and Christmastide, Epiphany Sunday, Baptism of the Lord Sunday, Transfiguration Sunday, Easter Season, Trinity Sunday, and Christ the King Sunday are represented by white. Green is the colour for periods of Ordinary Time. Red is for Pentecost Sunday, but may also be used for ordinations, church anniversaries, and memorial services for ordained clergy. Red or purple are appropriate for Palm Sunday. During Holy Week, purple is used until the church is stripped bare on Maundy Thursday; the church remains stripped bare on Good Friday and Holy Saturday, though in some places black might be used on those days.

Similarly, the United Church of Christ includes indications of which liturgical colour to use for each Sunday in its annual calendar. The general Western pattern is followed, with either purple or blue recommended for Advent.

The Church of Scotland recognises the use of liturgical colours; they are listed in the Church’s Book of Common Order. It is optional for ministers and congregations to decide to use liturgical colours.

== Bibliography ==
- Ordo missae celebrandae et divini officii persolvendi secundum calendarium romanum generale pro anno liturgico 2020 - 2021 (in Latin). Libreria Editrice Vaticana. 2020. ISBN 978-8826604176.
- Moroney, Msgr. James Patrick, ed. (2002). General Instruction of the Roman Missal (3 ed.). International Committee on English in the Liturgy, Inc. "Third Typical Edition"
