= List of things named after Christ the King =

Christ the King is a title sometimes given to Jesus Christ.

== Antigua ==
- Christ the King High School, St. John's, Antigua

== Belgium ==
- Church of Christ the King (Antwerp), parish church originally built for the 1930 World's Fair, Antwerp

== Canada ==
- Cathedral Basilica of Christ the King, Hamilton, Ontario
- Christ the King Cathedral, Gaspé, Quebec
- Christ the King College, London, Ontario

== Ireland ==
- Cathedral of Christ the King, Mullingar – First cathedral in the world to be dedicated under that title
- Coláiste Chríost Rí (Irish for "Christ the King College") boys' secondary school in Cork city

== Italy ==
- Institute of Christ the King Sovereign Priest, a Roman Catholic Society of Apostolic Life

== Lithuania ==
• Cathedral of Christ the King, seat of the Diocese of Panevėžys in Panevėžys, Aukštaitija

== Malta ==
- Basilica of Christ the King, Paola

== Philippines ==
- Christ the King Cathedral, the see of the Diocese of Tagum, Tagum City, Davao del Norte
- Parish of Christ the Eucharistic King (PChEK), commonly known as the "Old Cathedral", the former see of the Diocese of Tagum, Tagum City, Davao del Norte
- Christ the King Specialists Hospital (CKSH), a medical hospital run by the Diocese of Tagum, Tagum City, Davao del Norte
- Christ the King College, Gingoog, Misamis Oriental
- Christ the King Mission Seminary operated by the Society of the Divine Word in Quezon City
- Christ the King Parish, Greenmeadows, Quezon City
- Christ the King Statue, Gingoog City, Misamis Oriental
- Kristong Hari (Filipino for Christ the King), a barangay in Quezon City

== Poland ==
- Christ the King Statue, Świebodzin

== Portugal ==
- Christ the King monument and sanctuary, with annex seminary, in Almada

== Spain ==
- Warriors of Christ the King – Spanish far-right paramilitary organization

== United Kingdom ==
- The Metropolitan Cathedral of Christ the King, Liverpool
- The Church of Christ the King, Bloomsbury, London
- Christ the King Catholic High School, Southport

== United States ==
- Cathedral of Christ the King, Atlanta, Georgia
- Christ the King Chapel, St. Ambrose University, Davenport, Iowa
- Cathedral of Christ the King (Lexington, Kentucky)
- Christ the King Presbyterian Church, Cambridge, Massachusetts
- Cathedral of Christ the King (Lubbock, Texas)
