= Feria =

Day other than the sabbath day

In the liturgy of the Catholic Church, a feria is a day of the week other than Sunday.

In more recent official liturgical texts in English, the term weekday is used instead of feria.

If the feast day of a saint falls on such a day, the liturgy celebrated may be that of the saint, not that of the feria (the weekday liturgy). Accordingly, in actual liturgical practice a feria or ferial day is "a weekday on which no special ecclesiastical feast is to be celebrated".

== Etymology ==
The Harvard Dictionary of Music explains the etymology feria as "the reverse of the original meaning of L. feria, i.e., festival day. The reversal came about by extending the use of the word from Sunday to the other days, Sunday being named feria prima, Monday feria secunda, Tuesday feria tertia, etc."

Since in ecclesiastical Latin the names of Sunday and Saturday do not contain the word feria and are called respectively dominica and sabbatum, some use the term feria "to denote the days of the week with the exception of Sunday and Saturday", in spite of the official definition given above and the actual usage in official liturgical books.

The Galician and Portuguese languages uses the same terminology as ecclesiastical Latin for the days of the week, calling the days from Monday to Friday segunda-feira, terça-feira (literally, "second weekday", "third weekday"), etc., but calling Saturday sábado and Sunday domingo (see Numbered days of the week).

== Classification ==
The Roman Rite no longer distinguishes different classes of ferias (weekdays) as in the 1960 Code of Rubrics of Pope John XXIII, but it attributes different positions to them in ranking liturgical days. In the Table of Liturgical Days according to their order of precedence, attached to the Universal Norms on the Liturgical Year and the Calendar, Ash Wednesday and weekdays of Holy Week from Monday up to and including Thursday are outranked only by the Paschal Triduum, the four solemnities of Christmas, Epiphany, Ascension and Pentecost, and the Sundays of Advent, Lent, and Easter. Weekdays of Advent from 17 December up to and including 24 December and weekdays of Lent rank above memorials. Other liturgical weekdays (ferias) come last in the ranking.

The Code of Rubrics of 1960 introduced a newly invented division of ferias into four classes:

- First-class ferias, outranking all feasts: Ash Wednesday and all the weekdays of Holy Week;
- Second-class ferias, outranking local second-class feasts and, if impeded, requiring to be commemorated: ferias of Advent from 17 December to 23 December, and Ember Days of Advent, Lent and September;
- Third-class ferias: ferias in Lent from Thursday after Ash Wednesday to Saturday before the Second Sunday of the Passion (Palm Sunday) except Ember Days (these outranked third-class feasts), and ferias in Advent up to 16 December except Ember Days (these were outranked by third-class feasts);
- Fourth-class ferias: all other ferias (weekday liturgies).

Before 1960, the Roman Rite knew a simpler distinction between major and minor ferias. The major ferias were those of Advent and Lent, the Ember days, and the Monday of Rogation week. These had to be commemorated even on the highest feasts. All the others were minor ferias (liturgical weekdays). In addition, the major ferias of Ash Wednesday and Holy Week were privileged: these liturgies were to be celebrated no matter what feast happened to occur on those days.

== See also ==
- Ranking of liturgical days in the Roman Rite
- Solemnity
- Memorial
- Ember Days
- Octave
- General Roman Calendar
- Liturgical year
- Calendar of saints
- Commemoration in the Catholic liturgy
- Ordinary Time
- Chol HaMoed
- Workweek and weekend
