= Memorial (liturgy) =

Liturgical rank according to the General Roman Calendar

A memorial in the Roman Rite of the Catholic Church is a lower-ranked feast day in honour of a saint, the dedication of a church, or a mystery of the religion.

All feast days are ranked according to their importance and named as "solemnities", or "feasts", or "memorials".

Memorials are always supplanted by a coinciding solemnity, feast, Sunday, Ash Wednesday, Holy Week, or day of the Octave of Easter.

== Present rules ==
=== Observance ===
Celebrations of solemnities and feasts are distinguished from those of memorials by, for instance, recitation of the Gloria in excelsis in the Mass (an inclusion otherwise allowed only on Sundays) and the Te Deum in the Liturgy of the Hours.

The observance of memorials is integrated into the celebration of the occurring weekday (the feria) according to the norms set forth in the General Instruction of the Roman Missal (GIRM) and the Liturgy of the Hours.

The GIRM lays down that, for memorials of saints, "unless proper readings are given, the readings assigned for the weekday are normally used. In certain cases, particularised readings are provided, that is to say, readings which highlight some particular aspect of the spiritual life or activity of the Saint. The use of such readings is not to be insisted upon, unless a pastoral reason truly suggests it". The Collect proper to the memorial is used or, if this is lacking, one from an appropriate Common. As to the Prayer over the Offerings and the Prayer after Communion, unless these are proper, they may be taken either from the Common or from the weekday of the current time of the year.

Celebrations of memorials occurring between 17 and 24 December and during Lent, which are then never obligatory, consist of replacing the collect of the day with that of the saint.

The General Instruction of the Liturgy of the Hours gives the following indications on celebration of memorials occurring on ordinary days: In the Office of Readings and at Lauds and Vespers:

a) All the psalms with their antiphons are taken from the current weekday, unless the memorial has proper antiphons and psalms.
b) If the memorial has its own antiphon for the invitatory, hymn, short reading, Benedictus and Magnificat antiphons and intercessions, these are used. Otherwise these elements are taken either from the Common or from the Office of the current week and day.
c) The concluding prayer is taken from the Office of the saint.
d) In the Office of Readings, the biblical reading with its responsory is that assigned to the weekday. The hagiographical second reading with its responsory is proper to the saint, but if no proper reading is assigned, the reading is either taken from the Common or is the patristic reading of the weekday
e) Prayer during the Day and Compline are taken entirely from the weekday.

Celebrations of memorials occurring between 17 and 24 December and during Lent, which are then never obligatory, consist of adding to the Office of Readings, after the patristic reading and responsory of the weekday, the hagiographical reading and responsory of the saint, and concluding with the prayer of the saint; and adding to Lauds and Vespers, after the concluding prayer of the weekday, the antiphon (proper or common) and the prayer of the saint.

=== Obligatory and optional memorials ===
Memorials are either obligatory or optional. The rules governing the celebration of memorials, whether obligatory or optional, are identical. The only difference is precisely that an optional memorial need not be observed, and, with the limitations indicated for the second part of Advent and for Lent, there is the possibility of celebrating instead the Mass either of another memorial assigned to that day, or of the weekday, or of any saint mentioned in the Roman Martyrology for that day, or indeed (except during the first part of Advent, the days from 2 January to the day before Epiphany, and Eastertide), a Mass for Various Needs, or a Votive Mass.

Sometimes memorials that are called obligatory cease to be such. This occurs to those that fall within Lent. If two obligatory memorials coincide (as can happen when the movable memorial of the Immaculate Heart of Mary falls on the date of a fixed obligatory memorial), both become optional.

== Pre-Vatican II forms of the Roman Rite ==
In approximate correspondence to memorials, Pope John XXIII's 1960 Code of Rubrics spoke of "third-class feasts", as can be seen in the General Roman Calendar of 1960, and gave some of them, either permanently or on the occasions when their celebration coincided with one of higher rank, only a commemoration within the office actually celebrated. The Code of Rubrics laid down that, unless proper psalms are assigned, a third-class office uses the weekday psalms and at matins combines the second and third readings for the ferial day into a second reading, with a reading about the saint or mystery providing the third, followed by the Te Deum. In lauds and vespers, everything after the psalms is either from the proper or the common of the feast. The same is done at terce, sext, and none. There are very few changes at prime. Compline is of the weekday unless otherwise assigned. Third-class feasts are merely commemorated on weekdays of Lent and are not observed on Sundays. During Advent, they add a commemoration of the ferial day, except on 17–23 December, days classified as second-class ferias that thus outrank them.

Before the 1960 Code of Rubrics, saints and mysteries were traditionally ranked as doubles, semidoubles and simples, with doubles further subdivided into first-class doubles, second-class doubles, major doubles and mere doubles. A few years before Pope John XXIII's reform, Pope Pius XII had already abolished semidoubles and Pope Pius X had done away with the tradition that any double feast, of which there were over 200 in the course of the year, outranked a normal Sunday celebration.

== See also ==
- General Roman Calendar
