= Kingdomtide =

Liturgical season observed by certain Christian denominations

Kingdomtide or the Kingdom Season is a liturgical season observed in the autumn by some Anglican and Protestant denominations of Christianity. The season of Kingdomtide was initially promoted in America in the late 1930s, particularly when in 1937 the US Federal Council of Churches recommended that the entirety of the summer calendar between Pentecost and Advent be named Kingdomtide. In practice, most denominations that have adopted the Kingdom Season have restricted it to the later autumnal part of Ordinary Time.

== History ==
In 1925 Pope Pius XI instituted the Feast of Christ the King throughout the Roman Catholic Church in his encyclical Quas primas. From its inception, the celebration resonated with many other denominations, and over the following half a century the same celebration (or a broadly similar one) was introduced to the calendars of many churches of Lutheran, Anglican, Moravian, Methodist, Nazarene, Reformed and United Protestant tradition. The feast was incorporated into the Revised Common Lectionary which became (and remains) the lectionary of a significant proportion of denominations worldwide. The readings appointed for the Sundays leading up to Christ the King all refer to the theme of God's Kingdom.

In 1937, the US Federal Council of Churches (a predecessor of the National Council of Churches) recommended that the entire part of the Christian calendar between Pentecost and Advent, commonly called Ordinary Time and ending with Christ the King, be re-named Kingdomtide. This proposal met with little support; however, two years later, the Methodist Episcopal Church adopted the term for the second half of this time period, with other Methodist and Presbyterian churches later following the same practice.

Precise criteria for determining when Kingdomtide began varied in different localities. A common practice was to start the season on the Sunday on or nearest 31 August, which gave Kingdomtide 13 Sundays every year; in some places, Kingdomtide began on the last Sunday in August, giving the season 13 Sundays in some years and 14 in others. In all cases, the last Sunday of Kingdomtide is observed as the Feast of Christ the King.

By 1992, the United Methodist Church in the United States was believed to be the only denomination still using the term Kingdomtide, and even within the United Methodist Church the observance has now become a minority one. However, around the same time the term Kingdom Season started to be discussed in Anglican liturgical circles.

Towards the end of the twentieth century, and into the early years of the twenty-first century, many Anglican churches issued new liturgies, or in some cases "alternative" liturgies to supplement the traditionally unifying liturgical text, the Book of Common Prayer. Some of these churches have made provision for the marking of a Kingdom Season across the final four Sundays of the liturgical year, stretching from All Saints' Day to Christ the King.

== Anglican Usage ==
With the reduced use of Kingdomtide in the Methodist tradition, the practice is currently most common within certain parts of the Anglican Communion.

In the Church of England, "the period between All Saints' Day and the First Sunday of Advent is observed as a time of celebration and reflection on the reign of Christ in earth and heaven". Despite the official nomenclature, this period is commonly named the Kingdom Season by those churches choosing to observe it.

In the Church in Wales the Kingdom Season was formally enshrined in the revised "Church in Wales Lectionary" of 2004 and the companion volume "Times and Seasons" published in 2017. The final four Sundays of the year (which follow All Saints' Day) are officially named the First, Second, Third, and Fourth Sundays of the Kingdom, with the "Fourth Sunday of the Kingdom" also named "Christ the King". The Times and Seasons publication identifies the Kingdom Season as a subsection of Ordinary Time, and states: "This season of discipleship [Ordinary Time] culminates in the Kingdom Season. A relatively recent season, it arises from the need to provide shape to commemorations focussing on earth and heaven with Christ’s Kingship over all."

== Liturgical Colour ==
The traditional liturgical colour for Ordinary Time is green. Green vestments and paraments are generally also used at church services during Kingdomtide within the United Methodist Church tradition, reflecting the sense of Kingdomtide as a subsection of Ordinary Time.

Although the Church of England also indicates that the Kingdom Season is a subsection of Ordinary Time, and marks it as such in the liturgical calendar published in Common Worship (Times and Seasons) and elsewhere, it encourages the use of red vestments for the days between All Saints Day and Christ the King, to differentiate the period.
