= Solemnity =

Highest-ranking feast day of the Roman Rite

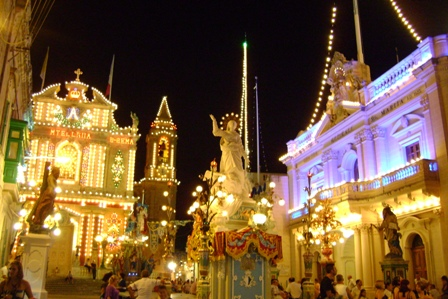

In the liturgical calendar of the Roman Rite, a solemnity is a feast day of the highest rank celebrating a mystery of faith such as the Trinity, an event in the life of Jesus, his mother Mary, his legal father Joseph, or another important saint. The observance begins with the vigil on the evening before the actual date of the feast. Unlike feast days of the rank of feast (other than feasts of the Lord) or those of the rank of memorial, solemnities replace the celebration of Sundays outside Advent, Lent, and Easter (those in Ordinary Time).

The word comes from postclassical Latin sollemnitas, meaning a solemnity, festival, celebration of a day.

== Ranking ==
The solemnities of Nativity of the Lord, the Epiphany, the Ascension, and Pentecost are outranked only by the Paschal Triduum.

Other solemnities inscribed in the General Roman Calendar give way also to the following celebrations:

- The Paschal Triduum
- Sundays of Advent, Lent, and Easter
- Ash Wednesday
- Weekdays of Holy Week up to and including Thursday
- Days within the Octave of Easter

Solemnities inscribed in particular calendars yield not only to these, but also to the Commemoration of All the Faithful Departed.

With the exceptions noted in the table below regarding the solemnities of Saint Joseph and the Annunciation of the Lord, a solemnity that falls on the same day as a celebration of higher rank is transferred to the next day not occupied by a solemnity, a Sunday or a feast.

Among solemnities inscribed in the General Roman Calendar, those of the Lord have precedence over those of the Blessed Virgin and these latter over solemnities of other saints. Thus if, for instance, the Solemnity of the Sacred Heart of Jesus coincides with that of the Nativity of Saint John the Baptist or that of Saints Peter and Paul, it is these that are transferred to the next free day.

Among solemnities inscribed in particular calendars (proper solemnities) the order of precedence is:

1. The solemnity of the principal patron of the place, city or state
2. The solemnity of the dedication or anniversary of the dedication of one's own church
3. The solemnity of the title of one's own church (the mystery or saint to which it is dedicated)
4. The solemnity of either the title or the founder of a religious institute

== List and dates ==
The solemnities inscribed in the General Roman Calendar and which are therefore observed throughout the Latin Church are indicated in the following list.

| Date | Solemnity | Notes about date |
|---|---|---|
| 1 January | The Blessed Virgin Mary, the Holy Mother of God | Octave of Christmas, Circumcision of the Lord, New Year's Day |
| 6 January | Epiphany of the Lord | Where not a holy day of obligation, transferred to the Sunday between 2 and 8 January, inclusive |
| 19 March | Saint Joseph, spouse of the Blessed Virgin Mary | If the Solemnity of Saint Joseph, where observed as a holy day of obligation, coincides with Palm Sunday, it is, by exception to the general rule, anticipated to Saturday, 18 March; where not observed as a holy day of obligation, the episcopal conference may transfer it to a date outside Lent. |
| 25 March | Annunciation of the Lord | If the Solemnity of the Annunciation of the Lord falls on any day of Holy Week, it is always transferred to the Monday after the Second Sunday of Easter (30 March to 9 April), rather than, in accordance with the general rule, to the next day not occupied by a celebration with at least the rank of feast |
| Thursday before Easter Sunday (19 March to 22 April) | Institution of the Eucharist | Begins the Paschal Triduum, celebrates the Last Supper which established the Eucharist. |
| (22 March to 25 April) | Resurrection of the Lord (Easter) | Concludes the Paschal Triduum that commemorates the resurrection of Christ. See Computus for date computation. Begins Octave of Easter, eight consecutive days celebrated as one continuous solemnity, ending 29 March to 2 May. See also Resurrection of Jesus. |
| Thursday after the Sixth Sunday of Easter (40th day of Eastertide – 30 April to 3 June) | Ascension of the Lord | If not a holy day of obligation, transferred to replace the Seventh Sunday of Easter (3 May to 6 June) |
| 50th day of Eastertide (10 May to 13 June) | Pentecost | (Whitsunday); always on a Sunday |
| Sunday after Pentecost (17 May to 20 June) | Trinity Sunday | |
| Thursday after Trinity Sunday (21 May to 24 June) | Most Holy Body and Blood of Christ (Corpus Christi) | If not a holy day of obligation, transferred to the following Sunday (24 May to 27 June). |
| Friday (8 days after Corpus Christi Thursday, 5 days after Corpus Christi Sunday) (29 May to 2 July) | Most Sacred Heart of Jesus | |
| 24 June | Nativity of Saint John the Baptist | |
| 29 June | Saints Peter and Paul | |
| 15 August | Assumption of the Blessed Virgin Mary | |
| 1 November | All Saints' Day | |
| Last Sunday before Advent (20–26 November) | Our Lord Jesus Christ, King of the Universe | Replaces 34th Sunday in Ordinary Time |
| 8 December | Immaculate Conception of the Blessed Virgin Mary | |
| 25 December | Nativity of the Lord (Christmas) | everywhere a holy day of obligation; see also Nativity of Jesus |

=== Proper solemnities ===
There are also solemnities not inscribed in the General Roman Calendar, which are observed in particular places, regions, churches or religious institutes. The optional memorial of Saint Patrick on 17 March is a solemnity in Ireland, the memorial of Saint Josemaría Escrivá on 26 June is a solemnity within the prelature of Opus Dei, and the optional memorial of Our Lady of Mount Carmel on 16 July is a solemnity for the Carmelites.

A partial list of proper solemnities follows below:

| Date | Solemnity | Country or religious order |
|---|---|---|
| 19 January | Saint Henry (bishop of Finland) | Finland |
| 31 January | Don Bosco (Saint John Bosco) | Salesians of Don Bosco |
| 22 February | Chair of Saint Peter | Personal Ordinariate of the Chair of Saint Peter |
| 1 March | Saint David | Wales |
| 17 March | Saint Patrick | Ireland (holy day of obligation) and Australia |
| 23 April | Saint George | England |
| 23 April | Saint Adalbert of Prague | Poland |
| 3 May | Our Lady, Queen of Poland | Poland |
| 6 May (formerly 9 March) | Saint Dominic Savio | Salesians of Don Bosco |
| 8 May | Saint Stanislaus of Szczepanów | Poland |
| 8 May | Our Lady of Luján (Nuestra Señora de Luján) | Argentina |
| 24 May | Mary Help of Christians | Australia, Salesians of Don Bosco |
| 24 May | Transfer of remains of Saint Dominic | Dominican Order (where 8 August is not a solemnity) |
| 26 June | Saint Josemaría Escrivá | prelature of Opus Dei |
| 3 July | Saint Thomas the Apostle | India and Syro-Malabar Catholic Church (holy day of obligation in some Middle Eastern countries) |
| 5 July | Saints Cyril and Methodius | Slovakia, Czech Republic |
| 11 July | Saint Benedict of Nursia | Order of Saint Benedict |
| 16 July | Our Lady of Mount Carmel | Carmelites, Discalced Carmelites, Bolivia, and Chile |
| 20 July | Saint Elijah the Prophet | Carmelites (not discalced) |
| 25 July | Saint James, son of Zebedee, the Apostle (Santiago el Mayor) | Spain (holy day of obligation) |
| 29 July | King Saint Olaf II of Norway | Norway |
| 31 July | Saint Ignatius of Loyola | Society of Jesus |
| 8 August | Saint Mary MacKillop of the Cross | Australia |
| 8 August | Saint Dominic | Dominican Order (where 24 May is not a solemnity) |
| 11 August | Saint Clare of Assisi | Poor Clares and some other Franciscans |
| 20 August | King Saint Stephen I of Hungary | Hungary |
| 26 August | Black Madonna of Częstochowa | Poland |
| 28 August | Saint Augustine of Hippo | Augustinians |
| 30 August | Saint Rose of Lima | Peru |
| 4 September (?) | Our Lady of Consolation | Augustinians |
| 8 September | Nativity of Mary | Lithuania and Syro-Malankara Catholic Church (holy day of obligation in some Middle Eastern countries) |
| 15 September | Our Lady of Sorrows | Slovakia |
| 20 September | Saints Andrew Kim Taegon, the priest, and Paul Chong Hasang, and companions, martyrs | South Korea |
| 28 September | Saint Wenceslaus I, Duke of Bohemia | Czech Republic |
| 1 October | Saint Therese of Lisieux | Discalced Carmelites and France and some European Countries |
| 4 October | Saint Francis of Assisi | Franciscan |
| 12 October | Our Lady of Aparecida | Brazil |
| 15 October | Teresa of Ávila | Discalced Carmelites |
| 19 October (20 October in the United States) | Saint Paul of the Cross | Passionists |
| 24 October | Saint Anthony Mary Claret | Claretians |
| 3 November | Saint Martin de Porres | Peru |
| 16 November | Our Lady of the Gate of Dawn (Mother of Mercy) | Lithuania |
| 19 November | Our Lady of Providence | Puerto Rico |
| 24 November | Saint Andrew Trần An Dũng-Lạc and Companions, Martyrs | Vietnam |
| 27 November | Our Lady of the Miraculous Medal | Vincentian Family |
| 30 November | Andrew the Apostle | Russia and Scotland |
| 3 December | Saint Francis Xavier | India |
| 12 December | Our Lady of Guadalupe | Mexico (holy day of obligation) |
| 14 December | Saint John of the Cross | Discalced Carmelites |

== Observance ==
Even if it is a weekday or within Advent and Lenten season, if the day is a Solemnity, then the Gloria is said or sung (except Good Friday which is the second day of the Paschal Triduum), as well as the saying of the Creed at Mass, and there are two scriptural readings, not one, before the Gospel. Also, there will sometimes be processional and recessional hymns, and use of incense.

Some but not all solemnities are also holy days of obligation, on which, as on Sundays, Catholics are required to attend Mass and to avoid work and business that hinder divine worship or suitable relaxation of mind and body. All holy days of obligation have the rank of solemnity at least at local level, though not necessarily holding that rank in the General Roman Calendar. With the exception of the solemnities of the Sacred Heart of Jesus, the Annunciation of the Lord and the Birth of John the Baptist, all the solemnities inscribed in the General Roman Calendar are mentioned as holy days of obligation in canon 1246 of the Code of Canon Law, but are not necessarily all observed in a particular country.

When a solemnity falls on a Friday, the obligation to abstain from meat or some other food as determined by the episcopal conference does not apply.

== See also ==
- Afterfeast
- Great Feasts of the Orthodox Church
- Liturgical year
- Holy day of obligation
- Octave (liturgical)
- Ranking of liturgical days in the Roman Rite
- Synaxis
