= Trinity Sunday =

Western Christian feast day

- Shield of the Trinity
- Observed by: Western Christianity
- Type: Christianity
- Date: The Sunday after Pentecost (56 days after Easter)
- 2025 date: June 15 (Western); June 8 (Eastern)
- 2026 date: May 31 (Western); May 31 (Eastern)
- 2027 date: May 23 (Western); June 20 (Eastern)
- 2028 date: June 11 (Western); June 4 (Eastern)
- Frequency: Yearly
- Related to: Pentecost; Corpus Christi

Trinity Sunday is the first Sunday after Pentecost in the Western Christian liturgical calendar, and the Sunday of Pentecost in Eastern Christianity. Trinity Sunday celebrates the Christian doctrine of the Trinity, the three Persons of God: the Father, the Son, and the Holy Spirit.

== Western Christianity ==
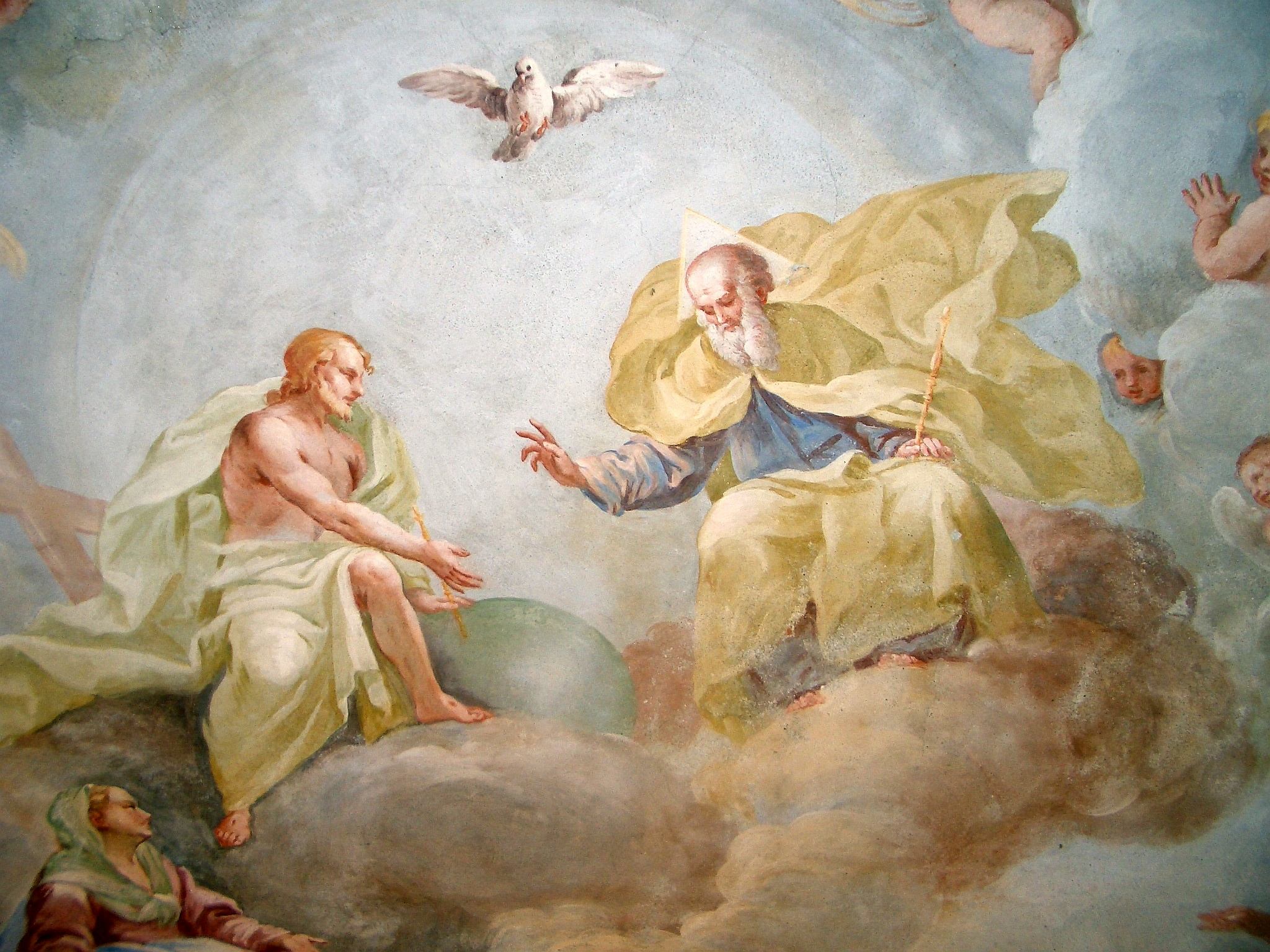
Holy Trinity, fresco by Luca Rossetti da Orta, 1738–39 (St. Gaudenzio Church at Ivrea, Turin)

Trinity Sunday is celebrated in all denominations of the Western liturgical churches: Latin Catholic, Lutheran, Anglican, Reformed (Continental Reformed, Presbyterian, Congregationalist), and Methodist.

=== History ===
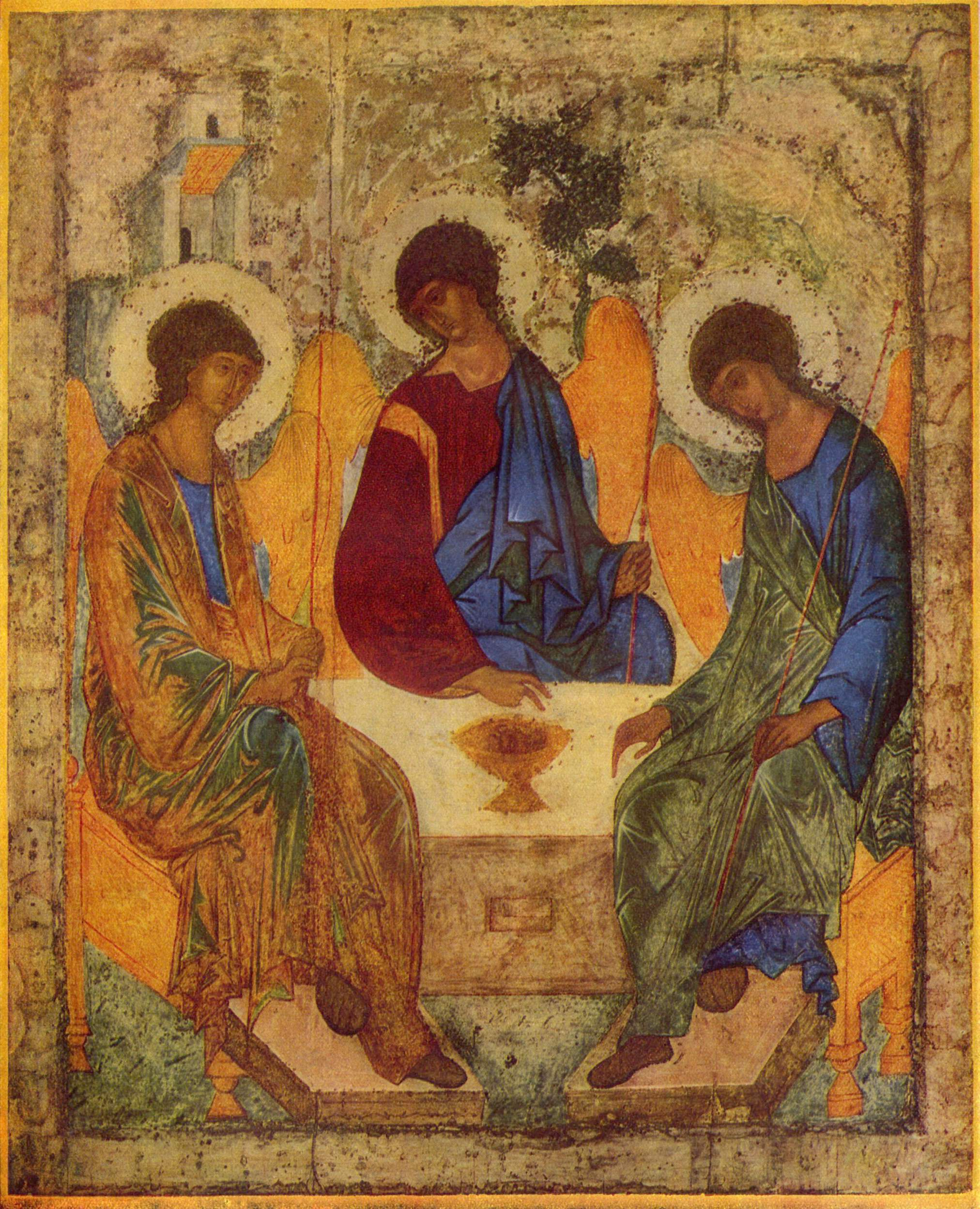
The Holy Trinity by St. Andrei Rublev, using the theme of the "Hospitality of Abraham." The three angels symbolize the Holy Trinity, which is rarely depicted directly in Byzantine art.

In the early Church, no special Office or day was assigned for the Holy Trinity. When the Arian heresy was spreading, the Fathers prepared an Office with canticles, responses, a Preface, and hymns, to be recited on Sundays. In the Sacramentary of Gregory the Great there are prayers and the Preface of the Trinity. During the Middle Ages, especially during the Carolingian period, devotion to the Blessed Trinity was a highly important feature of private devotion and inspired several liturgical expressions. Sundays are traditionally dedicated to the Holy Trinity.

The Micrologies written during the pontificate of Gregory VII list no special Office for the Sunday after Pentecost, but add that in some places they recited the Office of the Holy Trinity composed by Bishop Stephen of Liège (903–920). By others the Office was said on the Sunday before Advent. Alexander II (1061–1073), refused a petition for a special feast on the grounds that such a feast was not customary in the Roman Church which daily honoured the Holy Trinity by the Gloria Patri, etc., but he did not forbid the celebration where it already existed. A new Office had been made by the Franciscan John Peckham, Canon of Lyons, later Archbishop of Canterbury (d. 1292).

John XXII (1316–1334) ordered the feast for the entire Church on the first Sunday after Pentecost and established it as a Double of the Second Class. It was raised to the dignity of a primary of the first class, 24 July 1911, by Pope Pius X (Acta Ap. Sedis, III, 351). Since it was after the first great Pentecost that the doctrine of the Trinity was proclaimed to the world, the feast becomingly follows that of Pentecost.

=== Roman Catholicism ===
In the Roman Catholic Church, it is officially known as the Solemnity of the Most Holy Trinity. Prior to the reforms of the Second Vatican Council, it marked the end of a three-week period during which church weddings were forbidden. The period began on Rogation Sunday, the fifth Sunday after Easter. The prescribed liturgical color is white.

In the traditional Divine Office, the Athanasian Creed (Quicumque vult) is said on this day at Prime. Before 1960, it was said on all Sundays after Epiphany and Pentecost which do not fall within Octaves or on which a feast of Double rank or higher was celebrated or commemorated, as well as on Trinity Sunday. The 1960 reforms reduced it to once a year, on this Sunday.

In the 1962 Missal, the Mass for the First Sunday After Pentecost is not said or commemorated on Sunday (it is permanently impeded there by Trinity Sunday), but is used during the week if the ferial Mass is being said.

The Thursday after Trinity Sunday is observed as the Feast of Corpus Christi. In some countries, including the United States, Canada, and Spain, it may be celebrated on the following Sunday, when the faithful are more likely to attend Mass and be able to celebrate the feast.

=== Lutheranism ===
A distinctive feature of Lutheran worship is the recitation of the Athanasian Creed on Trinity Sunday during Matins. It may also supplant the Nicene Creed during the Mass. The Lutheran Book of Worship, Lutheran Worship, and Lutheran Service Book specify this.

=== Anglicanism ===
Trinity Sunday has the status of a Principal Feast in the Church of England and is one of seven principal feast days in the Episcopal Church (United States).

Thomas Becket (1118–1170) was consecrated Archbishop of Canterbury on the Sunday after Pentecost (Whitsun). His martyrdom may have influenced the popularity of the feast in England. This observance spread from Canterbury throughout the whole of western Christendom.

The Athanasian Creed, although not often used, is recited in certain Anglican churches, particularly those of High Church tendency. Its use is prescribed in the 1662 Book of Common Prayer of the Church of England for use on certain Sundays at Morning Prayer, including Trinity Sunday, and it is found in many modern Anglican prayer books. It is in the Historical Documents section of the 1979 Book of Common Prayer (Episcopal Church), but its use is not specifically provided for in the rubrics of that prayer book.

Parishes with an Anglo-Catholic churchmanship follow a calendar where Corpus Christi is observed on the following Thursday, or in some cases the following Sunday.

=== Methodism ===
In traditional Methodist usage, The Book of Worship for Church and Home (1965) provides the following Collects for Trinity Sunday:

Almighty and everlasting God, who hast given unto us thy servants grace, by the confession of a true faith, to acknowledge the glory of the eternal Trinity, and in the power of the divine majesty to worship the unity: We beseech thee to keep us steadfast in this faith and evermore defend us from all adversities who livest and reignest, one God, world without end. Amen.

Almighty and everlasting God, who hast revealed thyself as Father, Son, and Holy Spirit, and dost ever live and reign in the perfect unity of love: Grant that we may always hold firmly and joyfully to this faith, and, living in praise of thy divine majesty, may finally be one in thee; who art three persons in one God, world without end. Amen.

=== Dates ===
Dates for Trinity Sunday 2019–2033 In Gregorian dates
Year	Western	Eastern
2019	June 16	
2020	June 7	
2021	May 30	June 20
2022	June 12	
2023	June 4	
2024	May 26	June 23
2025	June 15	June 8
2026	May 31	
2027	May 23	June 20
2028	June 11	June 4
2029	May 27	
2030	June 16	
2031	June 8	June 1
2032	May 23	June 20
2033	June 12	

Trinity Sunday is the Sunday following Pentecost, and eight weeks after Easter Sunday. The earliest possible date is 17 May (as in 1818 and 2285). The latest possible date is 20 June (as in 1943 and 2038).

== Eastern Christianity ==
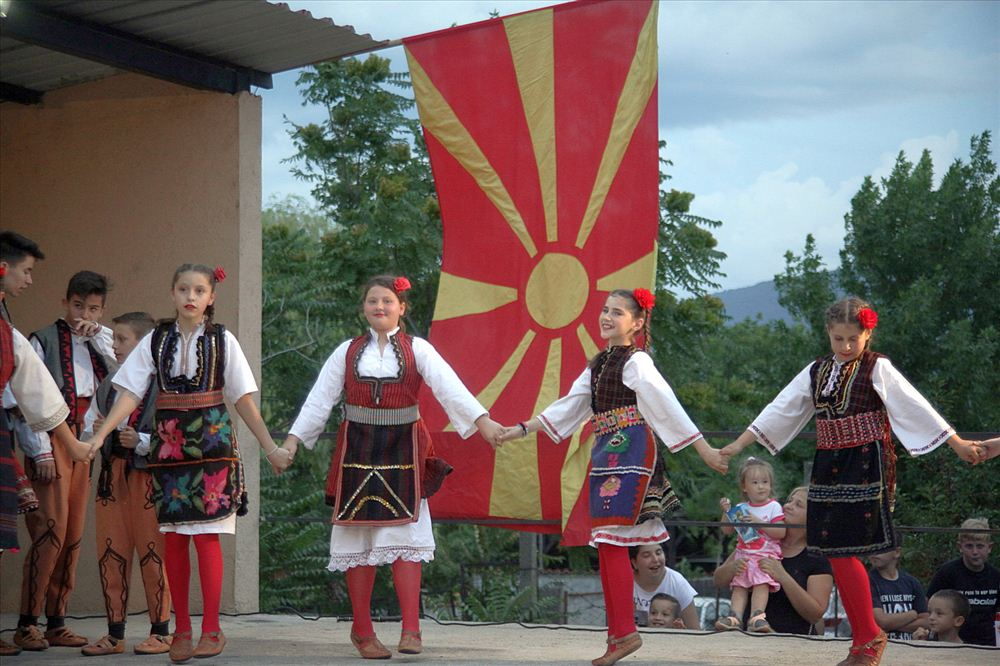
Dance at Bardovci church (Macedonian Orthodox) marking Trinity Sunday

In the Eastern Orthodox, Eastern Catholic and Eastern Lutheran churches, the Sunday of Pentecost itself is called Trinity Sunday (the Sunday after Pentecost is All Saints Sunday). The Monday after Pentecost is called Monday of the Holy Spirit, and the next day is called the Third Day of the Trinity. In the Eastern practice, green is used for Pentecost and its Afterfeast.

== Music ==
=== Alta Trinità beata ===
The oldest hymn still sung to this day on Trinity Sunday is a 12th century Italian hymn and recorded as such in the Laudario di Cortona, and known as Alta Trinità beata.

=== Bach cantatas ===
The Lutheran musician Johann Sebastian Bach composed a number of cantatas for Trinity Sunday. Three of them are extant, including O heilges Geist- und Wasserbad, BWV 165, Es ist ein trotzig und verzagt Ding, BWV 176, and Gelobet sei der Herr, mein Gott, BWV 129. The cantata Höchsterwünschtes Freudenfest, BWV 194, composed for dedication of the church and organ at Störmthal, was performed again in Leipzig for Trinity Sunday, first on 4 June 1724, a shortened version in 1726, and the complete version in 1731.

Sundays of the Easter cycle
Preceded by Pentecost	Trinity Sunday; May 31, 2026	Sundays after Pentecost (Ordinary Time)
