= Good Shepherd (disambiguation) =

The Good Shepherd is an image in the Christian Bible.

Good Shepherd may also refer to:

== Christianity ==
- Church of the Good Shepherd (disambiguation)
- Good Shepherd Sunday (disambiguation)
  - Third Sunday of Easter, the traditional Good Shepherd Sunday
  - Fourth Sunday of Easter, the day to which many Christian denominations assigned the reading after the liturgical reforms of the 1970s
- Good Shepherd Sisters, a Roman Catholic religious order
- Institute of the Good Shepherd, a Roman Catholic society of apostolic life of traditionalist Catholic priests in full communion with the Holy See
- Cathedral of the Good Shepherd, Roman Catholic church in Singapore
- Good Shepherd Cathedral of San Sebastián, Roman Catholic church in Basque Country, Spain
- Good Shepherd Cathedral, Ayr, Roman Catholic church in Scotland
- Chapel of the Good Shepherd (Chautauqua, New York), Episcopal
- Chapel of the Good Shepherd (Roosevelt Island), New York City

== Education ==
- Good Shepherd (Edmonton), a school district in Canada
- Good Shepherd Lutheran College, a school in Queensland, Australia
- Good Shepherd School, Grahamstown a school in Eastern Cape, South Africa

== Arts and entertainment ==
- The Good Shepherd (2004 film) or The Confessor, a Canadian film directed by Lewin Webb
- The Good Shepherd (film), a 2006 American film directed by Robert De Niro
- "The Good Shepherd" (Grimm), a television episode
- "Good Shepherd" (Star Trek: Voyager), a television episode
- The Good Shepherd (novel), a 1955 novel by C. S. Forester
- "Good Shepherd" (song), a traditional song best known for a 1969 arrangement and recording by Jefferson Airplane

== Other uses ==
- Good Shepherd IV, a small ferry connecting Fair Isle to the rest of Shetland in the UK
- Good Shepherd V, a small ferry connecting Fair Isle to the rest of Shetland in the UK, to replace Good Shepherd IV
