= Good Shepherd School =

Good Shepherd School may refer to:

- Good Shepherd Kuriannoor, school in Kerala, India
- Good Shepherd International School, Ooty, India
- Good Shepherd Cathedral School, Philippines
- Good Shepherd School, Grahamstown, South Africa
- Good Shepherd Lutheran School, California, US

== See also ==
- Good Shepherd (disambiguation)
