= Good Shepherd Sunday =

Good Shepherd Sunday is the day on which the Gospel passage of the Good Shepherd is read during the liturgies of certain Christian denominations. This may be the:

- Second Sunday after Easter or Third Sunday of Easter, the traditional Good Shepherd Sunday
- Fourth Sunday of Easter, the day to which many Christian denominations assigned the reading after the liturgical reforms of the 1970s
