= Easter cycle =

Part of the Christian liturgical year

The Easter cycle is the sequence of the seasons and days in the Christian liturgical year which are pegged to the date of Easter, either before or after it. In any given calendar year, the timing of events within the Easter cycle is dependent on the calculation of the date of Easter itself.

== Western Christianity ==
The following liturgical seasons and days, celebrated by various traditions within Western Christianity, are celebrated a fixed amount of time either before or after the day of Easter.

- Pre-Lent
  - Septuagesima
  - Sexagesima
  - Quinquagesima
- Lent
  - Ash Wednesday
  - Ember Days of Lent
  - Laetare Sunday
  - Passiontide
    - Passion Sunday
    - Holy Week
      - Palm Sunday
      - Holy Monday
      - Holy Tuesday
      - Holy Wednesday
      - Triduum
        - Holy Thursday (Chrism Mass / Mass of the Lord's Supper)
        - Good Friday
        - Holy Saturday
        - Easter Vigil
- Easter
- Eastertide
  - Octave of Easter
    - Easter Monday
    - Easter Tuesday
    - Easter Wednesday
    - Easter Thursday
    - Easter Friday
    - Easter Saturday
    - Second Sunday of Easter (Divine Mercy Sunday)
  - Third Sunday of Easter
  - Fourth Sunday of Easter
  - Fifth Sunday of Easter
  - Sixth Sunday of Easter
  - Minor Rogation Days
  - Ascensiontide
    - Feast of the Ascension
    - Seventh Sunday of Easter
- Pentecost (Whitsun)
- Pentecost Season
  - Octave of Pentecost
    - Whit Monday
    - Whit Tuesday
    - Ember Days of Pentecost
    - Trinity Sunday
  - Feast of Corpus Christi
  - Feast of Christ the Priest
  - Feast of the Sacred Heart
  - Feast of the Immaculate Heart
