= Fifth Sunday of Easter =

Christian observance

- Also called: Cantate Sunday (Roman Rite)
- Observed by: Christians
- Observances: Church services
- Date: Four weeks after Easter
- 2025 date: May 18 (Western); May 18 (Eastern)
- 2026 date: May 3 (Western); May 10 (Eastern)
- 2027 date: April 25 (Western); May 30 (Eastern)
- 2028 date: May 14 (Western); May 14 (Eastern)

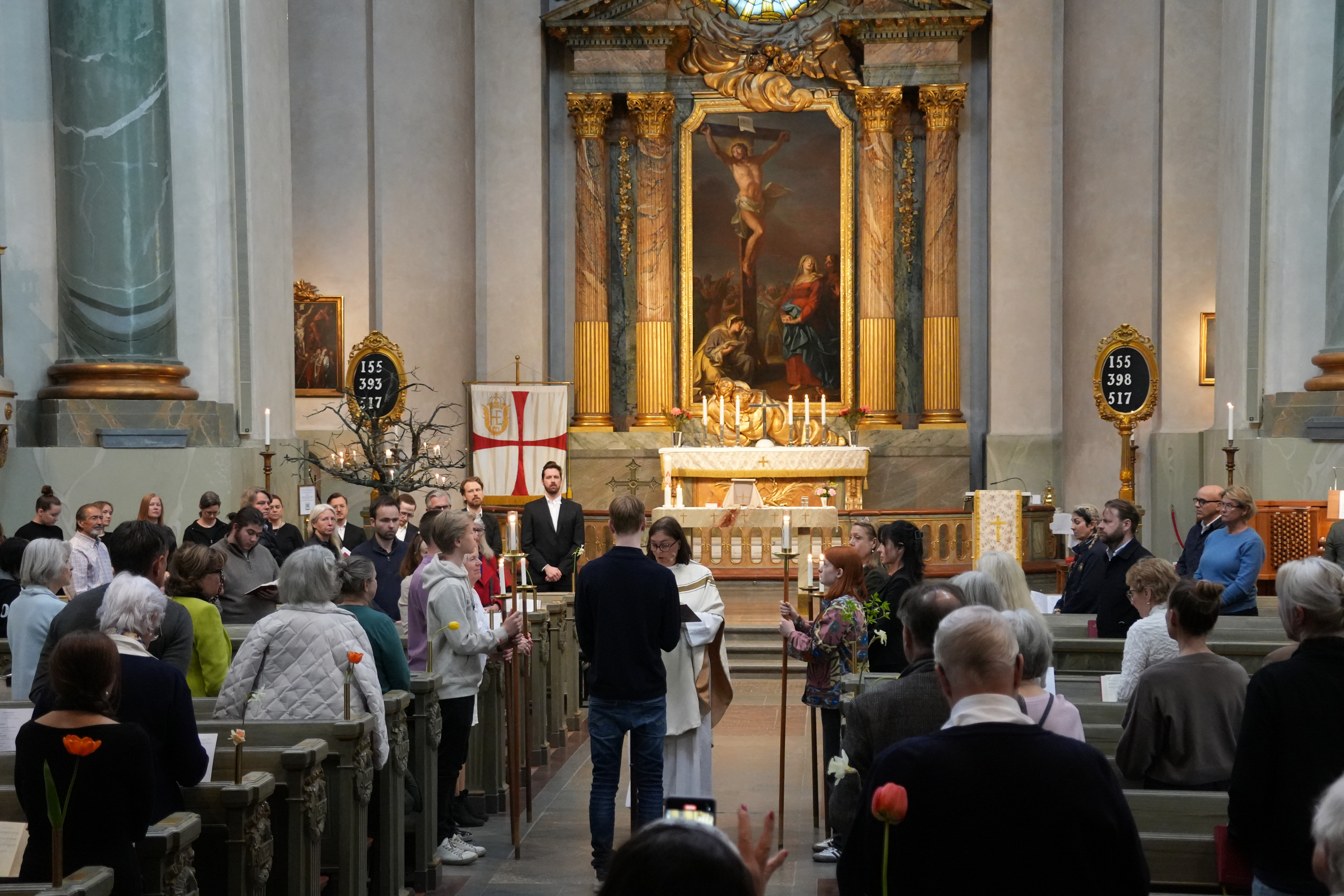
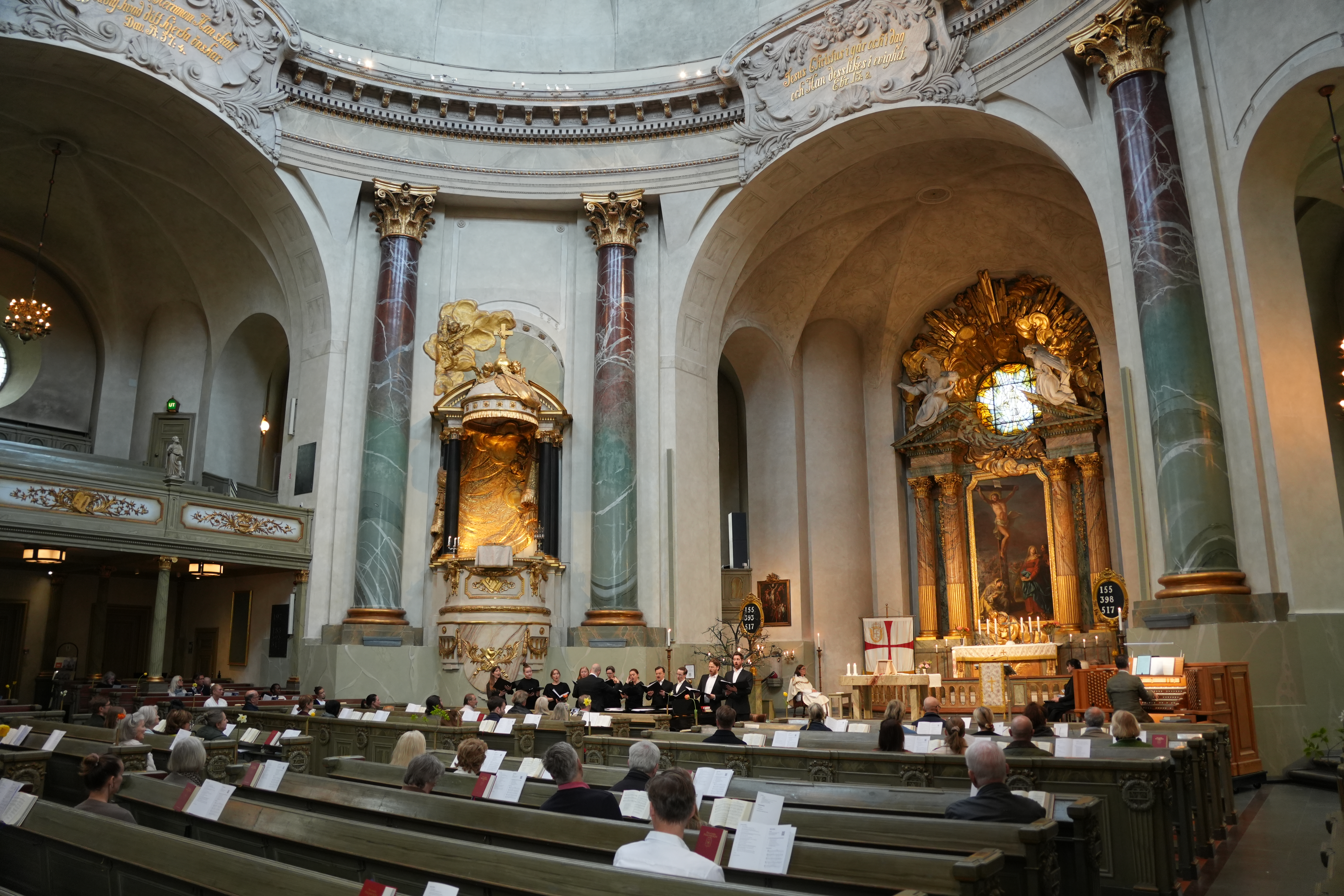
The celebration of the High Mass at Hedvig Eleonora Church (Evangelical-Lutheran) in Östermalm, Sweden on the Fifth Sunday of Eastertide

Incipit of the Gregorian chant introit for the fourth Sunday after Easter in the Liber Usualis.

The Fifth Sunday of Easter (or Fifth Sunday of Eastertide) is the fifth Sunday of the Easter season, being four weeks after the Christian celebration of Easter Sunday. In Western Christianity, this day is also known as the Fourth Sunday after Easter or Cantate Sunday. Eastern Christianity also calls this day the "Fifth Sunday," but typically using an Eastern synonym for Easter; for example, Fifth Sunday of Holy Pascha (as in the Byzantine Rite) or Fifth Sunday of the Resurrection (as in the West Syriac and East Syriac Rites). In the Byzantine Rite, this day is also known as the Sunday of the Samaritan Woman.

== Western Christianity ==
The name "Fifth Sunday of Easter" is used among Roman Catholic, Evangelical-Lutheran, Presbyterian, Anglican, Methodist, and other Western Christian liturgical churches. It is the name given to this day in the Roman Missal (used in the Roman Rite of the Catholic Church) and in the Revised Common Lectionary (widely used among English-speaking mainline Protestants). Tridentine editions of the Roman Missal called this day the Fourth Sunday after Easter, as do traditional versions of the Book of Common Prayer.

This day is also known as Cantate Sunday due to the incipit "Cantáte Dómino" (Sing to the Lord) of the introit assigned to this day in the Roman Rite. The full text of the introit in its original Latin is: "Cantáte Dómino cánticum novum, allelúia: quia mirabília fecit Dóminus, allelúia: ante conspéctum géntium revelávit iustítiam suam, allelúia, allelúia, allelúia. Salvávit sibi déxtera eius: et bráchium sanctum eius." This introit is based on Psalm 97:1–2 (which is now more commonly called Psalm 98 in accord with the Hebrew numbering used in modern Bibles).

For a brief period of time (1870–1911), this day was also known as the Octave Day of the Solemnity of St. Joseph, Patron of the Universal Church in the Roman Rite of the Catholic Church. This octave day was the follow-up to the original feast on the previous Sunday.

== Eastern Christianity ==
In the Byzantine Rite, this day is called the Fifth Sunday of Holy Pascha, and is also called the Sunday of the Samaritan Woman due to the Gospel passage (John 4:5–42) read on this day.

== See also ==
- Eastertide

Sundays of the Easter cycle
Preceded by Fourth Sunday of Easter	Fifth Sunday of Easter; May 3, 2026	Succeeded by Sixth Sunday of Easter
