= Ihr werdet weinen und heulen, BWV 103 =

Church cantata by Johann Sebastian Bach

Ihr werdet weinen und heulen
- BWV 103
- Church cantata by J. S. Bach
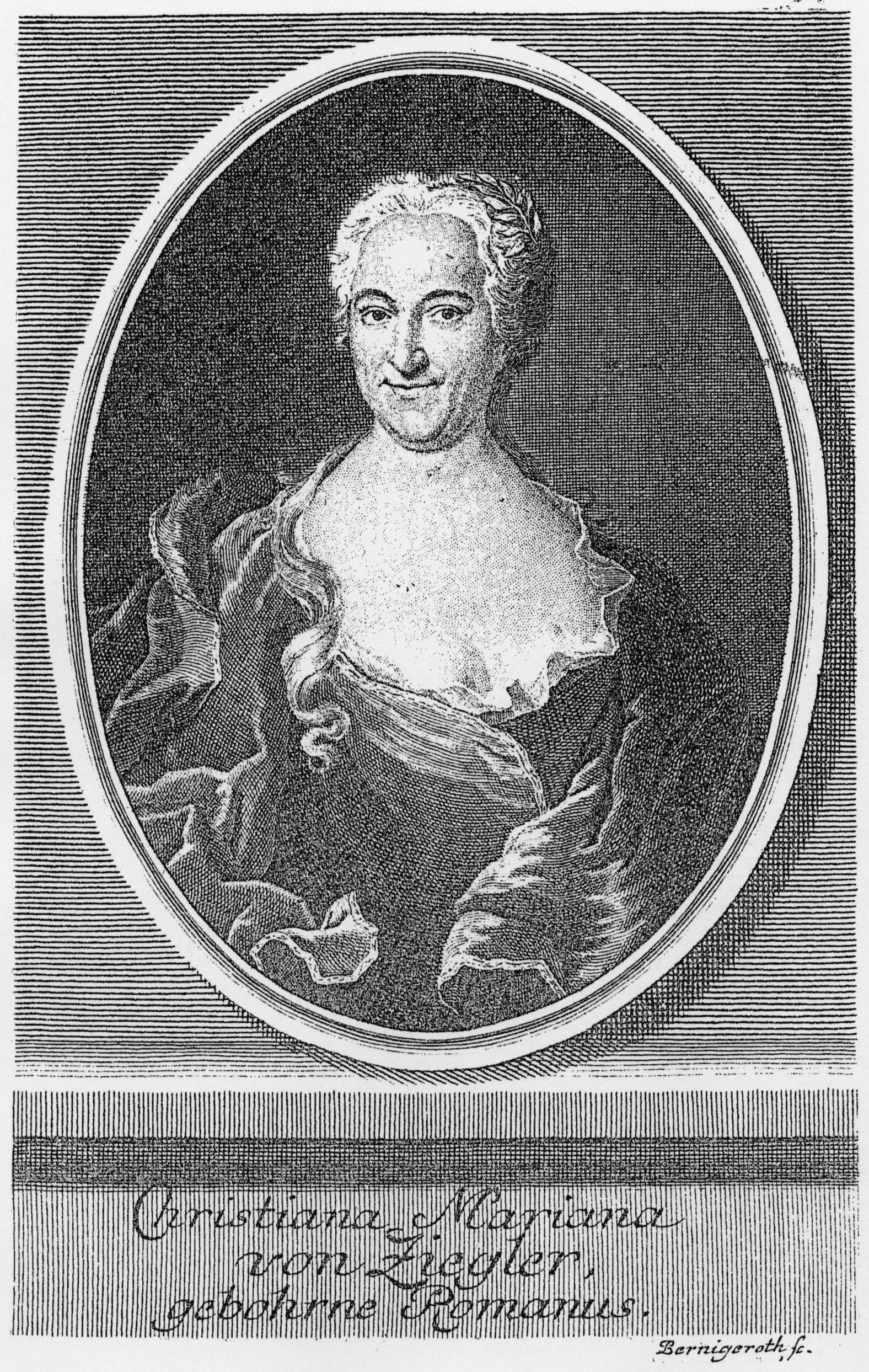
- Christiana Mariana von Ziegler, author of the cantata text
- Occasion: Jubilate Sunday
- Cantata text: Christiana Mariana von Ziegler
- Bible text: John 16:20
- Chorale: by Paul Gerhardt
- Performed: 22 April 1725: Leipzig
- Movements: 6
- Vocal: SATB choir; solo: alto, tenor and bass
- Instrumental: trumpet; flauto piccolo; 2 oboes d'amore; 2 violins; viola; continuo

Ihr werdet weinen und heulen (You shall weep and wail), BWV 103, is a cantata by Johann Sebastian Bach, a church cantata for the third Sunday after Easter, called Jubilate.

Bach composed the cantata in his second year as Thomaskantor in Leipzig and first performed it on 22 April 1725. It is the first of nine cantatas on texts by Christiana Mariana von Ziegler, which Bach composed at the end of his second annual cycle of cantatas in Leipzig. Based on the Gospel reading from the Farewell Discourse, where Jesus, announcing that he will leave, says "your sorrow shall be turned into joy", Bach contrasts music of sorrow and joy, notably in the unusual first movement, where he inserts an almost operatic recitative of Jesus in the fugal choral setting. The architecture of the movement combines elements of the usual concerto form with the more text-related older form of a motet. Bach scores an unusual flauto piccolo (descant recorder in D) as an obbligato instrument in an aria contemplating the sorrow of missing Jesus, who is addressed as a doctor who shall heal the wounds of sins. Bach scores a trumpet in only one movement, an aria expressing the joy about the predicted return of Jesus. The cantata in six movements closes with a chorale, the ninth stanza of Paul Gerhardt's hymn "Barmherzger Vater, höchster Gott".

== History and words ==
Bach composed the cantata in Leipzig for the Third Sunday after Easter, called Jubilate. The prescribed readings for the Sunday were from the First Epistle of Peter, "Submit yourselves to every ordinance of man" (1 Peter 2:11–20), and from the Gospel of John, Jesus announcing his second coming in the so-called Farewell Discourse, saying "your sorrow shall be turned into joy" (John 16:16–23). For this occasion Bach had already composed in 1714 Weinen, Klagen, Sorgen, Zagen, BWV 12, which he used later as the basis for the movement Crucifixus in his Mass in B minor.

In his second year in Leipzig, Bach composed chorale cantatas between the first Sunday after Trinity and Palm Sunday, but for Easter he returned to cantatas on more varied texts, possibly because he lost his librettist. Nine of his cantatas for consecutive occasions in the period between Easter and Pentecost are based on texts by Christiana Mariana von Ziegler, this one being the first of the series especially written for Bach. He had possibly commissioned them in 1724 for his first cantata cycle but not composed them at that time, because of his exceptional workload in creating the St John Passion.

The librettist begins with a quotation from the Gospel, verse 20, and concludes with the ninth stanza of Paul Gerhardt's hymn "Barmherzger Vater, höchster Gott" (1653). Her own poetry reflects, in a sequence of recitatives and arias, in two movements sadness at the loss of Jesus, and in two others joy at his predicted return. Bach edited her writing considerably, for example in movement 4, excising two lines of four and rephrasing the others. Ziegler published her text in 1728 in the collection Versuch in gebundener Schreibart.

Bach first performed the cantata on 22 April 1725 with the Thomanerchor. For later performances, he revised the instrumentation, replacing the flauto piccolo by a flauto traverso.

== Scoring and structure ==
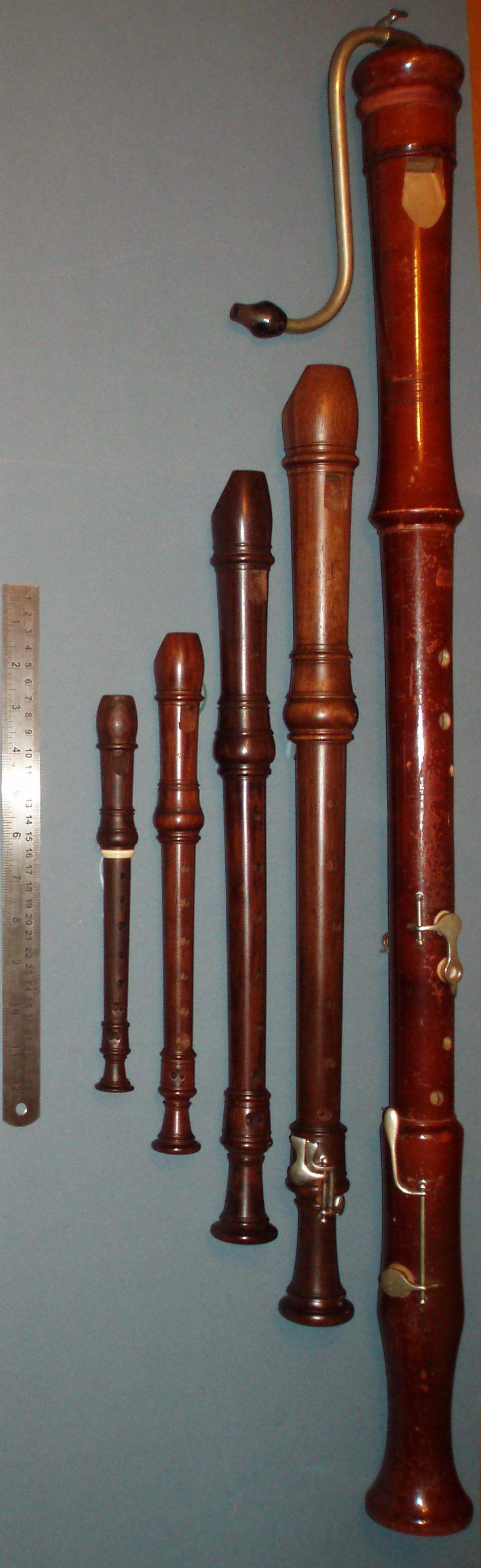
The size of a D-descant recorder (sixth flute) is between the two smallest ones illustrated here.

The cantata in six movements is scored for three vocal soloists (alto, tenor and bass), a four-part choir, trumpet, flauto piccolo (descant recorder in D), two oboes d'amore, two violins, viola and continuo.

1. Chorus and arioso (bass): Ihr werdet weinen und heulen
2. Recitative (tenor): Wer sollte nicht in Klagen untergehn
3. Aria (alto): Kein Arzt ist außer dir zu finden
4. Recitative (alto): Du wirst mich nach der Angst auch wiederum erquicken
5. Aria (tenor): Erholet euch, betrübte Sinnen
6. Chorale: Ich hab dich einen Augenblick

== Music ==
The cantata begins in B minor, illustrating sorrow, but in movement 4 shifts to the relative major key of D major, illustrating the theme of consolation in Ziegler's text.

The opening chorus has an unusual structure, which includes an arioso passage for the bass voice. All instruments except the trumpet play a ritornello, after which a choral fugue pictures the weeping and wailing of the text in unrelated musical material, rich in chromaticism. In great contrast the following line, "aber die Welt wird sich freuen" (But the world will rejoice), is conveyed by the chorus embedded in a repeat of the first part of the ritornello. The sequence is repeated on a larger scale: this time the fugue renders both lines of the text as a double fugue with the second theme taken from the ritornello, then the ritornello is repeated in its entirety. The bass as the vox Christi (voice of Christ) sings three times, with a sudden tempo change to adagio, "Ihr aber werdet traurig sein" (But you will be sad) as an accompagnato recitative. Musicologist Julian Mincham noted: "This recitative is a mere eight bars long but its context and piteousness give it enormous dramatic impact. Bach's lack of respect for the conservative Leipzig authorities' dislike of operatic styles in religious music was never more apparent!" Klaus Hofmann compares the recitative's "highly expressive melody and harmony" to Bach's Passions. Finally, the extended sequence of fugue and ritornello with chorus returns transposed, on the text "Doch eure Traurigkeit soll in Freude verkehret werden" (Yet your sorrow shall be changed into joy). According to Alfred Dürr, the architecture of the movement is a large scale experiment combining elements of the older style of a text-related motet with the form of a concerto of instrumental groups and voices, as typically used by Bach.

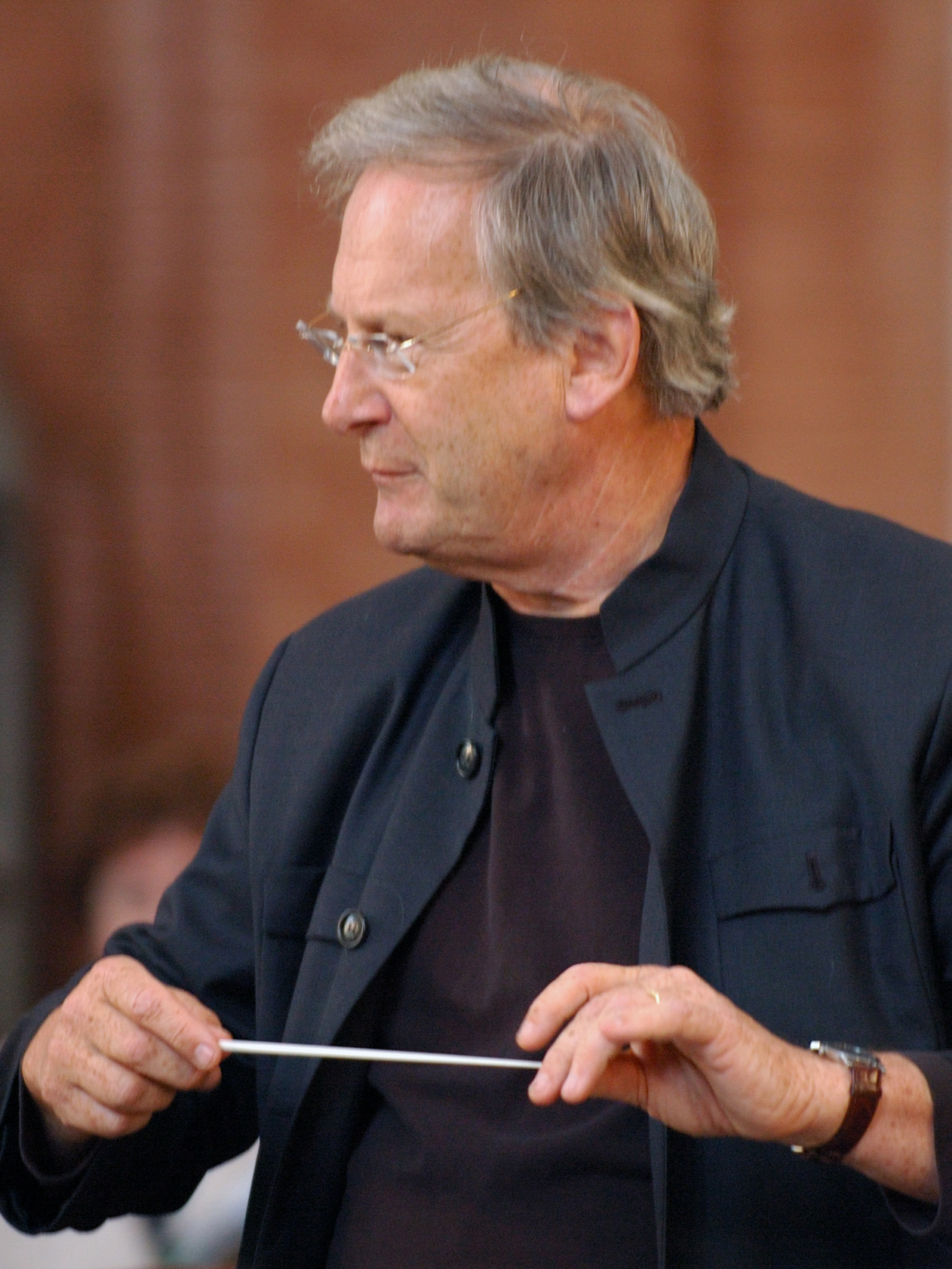
John Eliot Gardiner, 2007

John Eliot Gardiner, who conducted the Bach Cantata Pilgrimage with the Monteverdi Choir in 2000, notes that Bach's "strategy is to superimpose these opposite moods, binding them in a mutually enlightening whole and emphasising that it is the same God who both dispenses and then ameliorates these conditions.

Movement 2 is a secco recitative for tenor, concluding in an arioso section with a "deeply moving" melisma on the word "Schmerzen" (sorrows). Movement 3, "Kein Arzt ist außer dir zu finden" (Besides You is no doctor to be found) is an aria for alto with the obbligato flauto piccolo, which according to Mincham, employing a "figuration ever striving upwards, moderates the underlying sense of potential tragedy". The alto recitative "marks a change of scene", it begins in B minor, like the opening chorus, but modulates to D-major and ends with a wide-ranging coloratura marking the word "Freude" (joy). Movement 5, "Erholet euch, betrübte Sinnen" (Recover now, O troubled feelings), picks up the joyful coloraturas, supported by the trumpet and fanfares in triads in the orchestra; Mincham notes that the trumpet "bursts upon us with an energy, acclamation and jubilation unheard, so far, in this work". The cantata is closed with a four-part setting of the chorale, sung to the melody of "Was mein Gott will, das g'scheh allzeit" which Bach used frequently, including in his St Matthew Passion.

== Recordings ==
The entries of the following table are taken from the listing on the Bach Cantatas Website. For several recordings, the name of the bass soloist is not provided. Ensembles playing period instruments in historically informed performance are marked by green background.

Recordings of Ihr werdet weinen und heulen
Title	Conductor / Choir / Orchestra	Soloists	Label	Year	Orch. type
Bach Made in Germany Vol. 1 - Cantatas IV	Günther Ramin Thomanerchor Gewandhausorchester	Eva Fleischer; Gert Lutze	Eterna	1951	
Les Grandes Cantates de J. S. Bach Vol. 22	Fritz Werner Heinrich-Schütz-Chor Heilbronn Pforzheim Chamber Orchestra	Barbara Scherler; Georg Jelden; Jakob Stämpfli	Erato	1966	
Bach Kantaten, Vol. 8: BWV 103, BWV 85, BWV 86, BWV 144	Diethard Hellmann Bachchor Mainz Bachorchester Mainz	Marie-Luise Gilles; Kurt Equiluz	DdM-Records Mitterteich	late 1960s?	
J. S. Bach: Das Kantatenwerk · Complete Cantatas · Les Cantates, Folge / Vol. 26 – BWV 103–106	Gustav Leonhardt: Knabenchor Hannover; Choir of King's College; Leonhardt-Consort	Paul Esswood; Kurt Equiluz; Max van Egmond	Teldec	1980	Period
Die Bach Kantate Vol. 32	Helmuth Rilling Gächinger Kantorei Bach-Collegium Stuttgart	Doris Soffel; Peter Schreier; Walter Heldwein	Hänssler	1981	
Bach Edition Vol. 12 – Cantatas Vol. 6	Pieter Jan Leusink Holland Boys Choir Netherlands Bach Collegium	Sytse Buwalda; Knut Schoch; Bas Ramselaar	Brilliant Classics	1999	Period
Bach Cantatas Vol. 24: Altenburg/Warwick / For the 3rd Sunday after Easter (Jubilate) / For the 4th Sunday after Easter (Cantate)	John Eliot Gardiner: Monteverdi Choir; Choir of Clare; Choir of Trinity College; English Baroque Soloists	William Towers; Mark Padmore; Julian Clarkson	Soli Deo Gloria	2000	Period
J. S. Bach: Complete Cantatas Vol. 14	Ton Koopman Amsterdam Baroque Orchestra & Choir	Bogna Bartosz; Jörg Dürmüller; Klaus Mertens	Antoine Marchand	2001	Period
J. S. Bach: Wir danken dir, Gott"	Philippe Herreweghe Collegium Vocale Gent	Deborah York; Ingeborg Danz; Mark Padmore; Peter Kooy	Harmonia Mundi France	1999	Period
J. S. Bach: Cantatas Vol. 36 (Cantatas from Leipzig 1725) – BWV 6, 42, 103, 108	Masaaki Suzuki Bach Collegium Japan	Robin Blaze; Gerd Türk; Dominik Wörner	BIS	1999	Period
J. S. Bach: Kantate BWV 103 "Ihr werdet weinen und heulen"	Rudolf Lutz Schola Seconda Pratica	Ruth Sandhoff; Andreas Weller	Gallus Media	2010	Period

== Sources ==
- Ihr werdet weinen und heulen, BWV 103: performance by the Netherlands Bach Society (video and background information)
- Ihr werdet weinen und heulen, BWV 103: Scores at the International Music Score Library Project
- Ihr werdet weinen und heulen BWV 103; BC A 69 / Sacred cantata (4th Sunday of Easter) Bach Digital
- Ihr werdet weinen und heulen, BWV 103 Downloadable score (pdf) with modern clefs by atticbooks, 2016
- BWV 103 Ihr werdet weinen und heulen: English translation, University of Vermont
- BWV 103 Ihr werdet weinen und heulen: text, scoring, University of Alberta
