= Second Sunday of Easter =

First Sunday after the Christian celebration of Easter

- Observed by: Christians
- Observances: Church services
- Date: Sunday after Easter Sunday
- 2025 date: April 27 (Western); April 27 (Eastern)
- 2026 date: April 12 (Western); April 19 (Eastern)
- 2027 date: April 4 (Western); May 9 (Eastern)
- 2028 date: April 23 (Western); April 23 (Eastern)

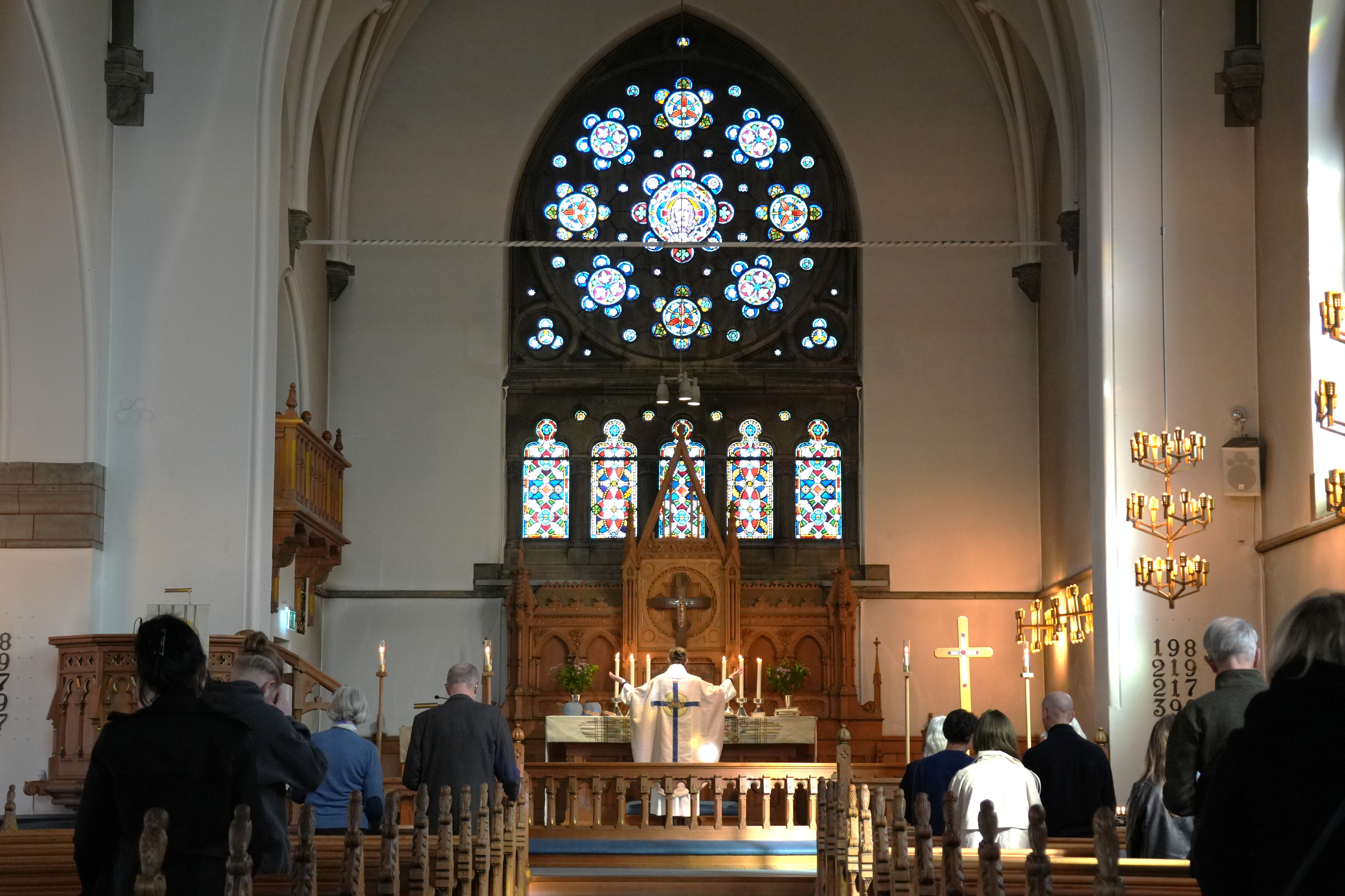
An Evangelical-Lutheran priest of the Church of Sweden celebrates the Mass ad orientem at Gustaf Adolf Evangelical-Lutheran Church (Stockholm) on the Second Sunday of Easter.

The Second Sunday of Easter is the eighth day of the Christian season of Eastertide, and the seventh after Easter Sunday. It is known by various names, including Divine Mercy Sunday, the Octave Day of Easter, White Sunday (Note: Not to be confused with Pentecost, which also goes by the name White Sunday or Whitsun.) (Latin: Dominica in albis), Quasimodo Sunday, Bright Sunday and Low Sunday. In Eastern Christianity, it is known as Antipascha, New Sunday, and Thomas Sunday.

== Biblical account ==
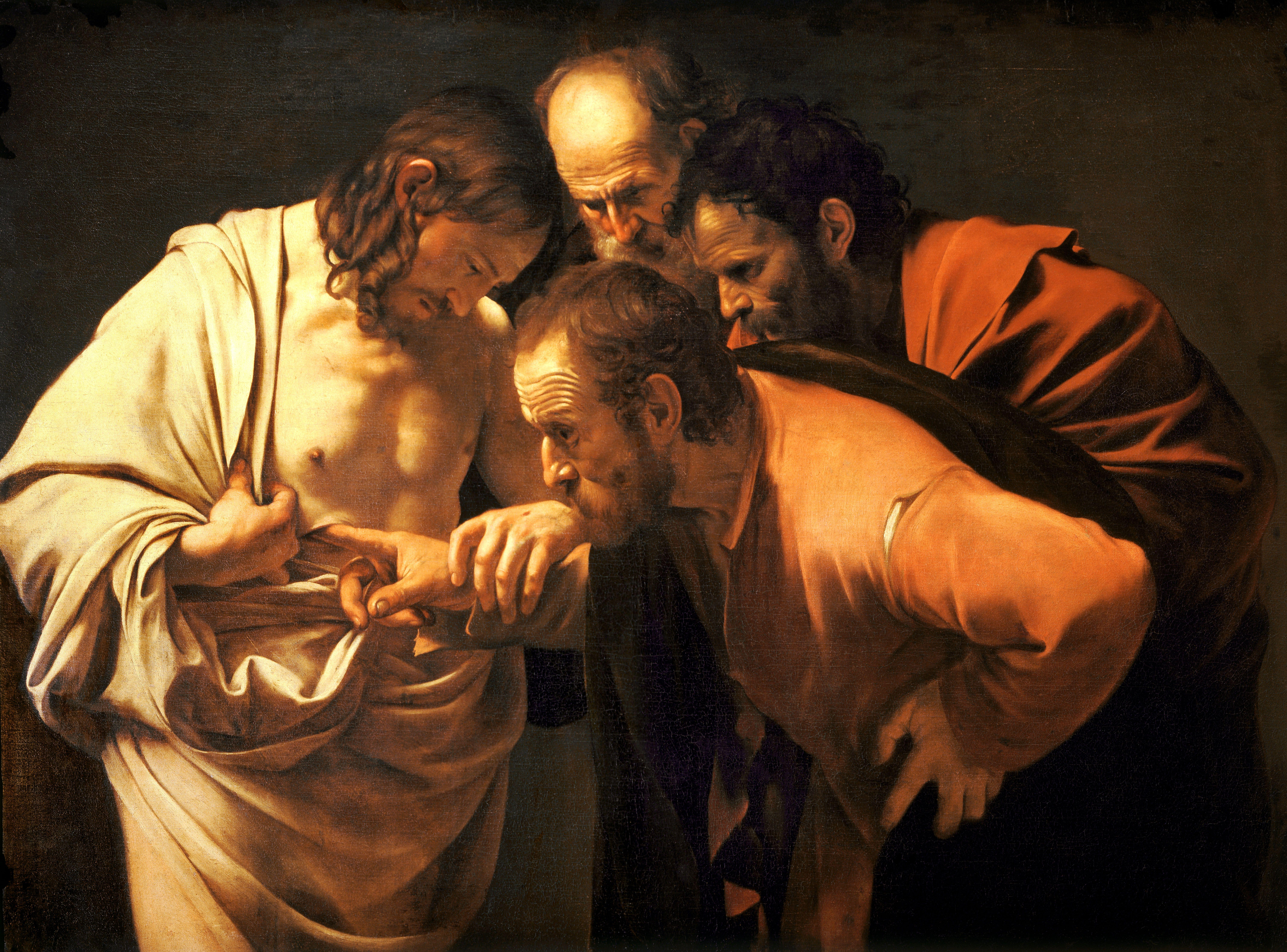
The Incredulity of Saint Thomas by Caravaggio.

The Second Sunday of Easter is the eighth day after Easter using the mode of inclusive counting, according to which Easter itself is the first day of the eight. Christian traditions which commemorate this day recall the Biblical account recorded to have happened on the same eighth day after the original Resurrection.

Eight days later, his disciples were again in the house, and Thomas was with them. The doors were shut, but Jesus came and stood among them, and said, "Peace be with you." Then he said to Thomas, "Put your finger here, and see my hands; and put out your hand, and place it in my side; do not be faithless, but believing." Thomas answered him, "My Lord and my God!" Jesus said to him, "Have you believed because you have seen me? Blessed are those who have not seen and yet believe."

— John 20:26–29

It is because of this Scriptural episode that this day is called Thomas Sunday in the Eastern tradition.

== Western Christianity ==
=== White Sunday ===
In early Roman Rite liturgical books, Easter Week used to be known as "White Week" (Latin: Ebdomada alba), because of the white robes worn during that week by those who had been baptized at the Easter Vigil. A pre-Tridentine edition of the Catholic Church's Roman Missal, published in 1474, called Saturday in albis, short for in albis depositis or in albis deponendis (of removal of the white garments), a name that was kept in subsequent Tridentine versions of the missal for that Saturday. In the 1604 edition of the Tridentine missal (but not in the original 1570 edition), the description in albis was applied also to the following Sunday, the octave day of Easter.

The 1962 Roman Missal (still in limited use today) refers to this Sunday as Dominica in albis in octava Paschæ. The name in albis was dropped in the 1970 revision.

In the Evangelical-Lutheran Churches, the Second Sunday of Easter (or Quasimodogeniti), according to The Lutheran Missal, "recounts the appearance of Our Lord to the apostles in the locked upper room, together with Thomas' confession".

=== Quasimodo Sunday ===
Gregorian chant notation (from the Liber Usualis) of the incipit of this day's introit, from which this day gets the name "Quasimodo Sunday."

The name Quasimodo (or Quasimodogeniti) originates from the incipit of this day's traditional Latin introit, which is based on 1 Peter 2:2:

Quasi modo géniti infántes, allelúia: rationábile, sine dolo lac concupíscite, allelúia, allelúia, allelúia.

Translated into English:

As newborn babes, alleluia: desire the rational milk without guile, alleluia, alleluia, alleluia.

== Low Sunday ==
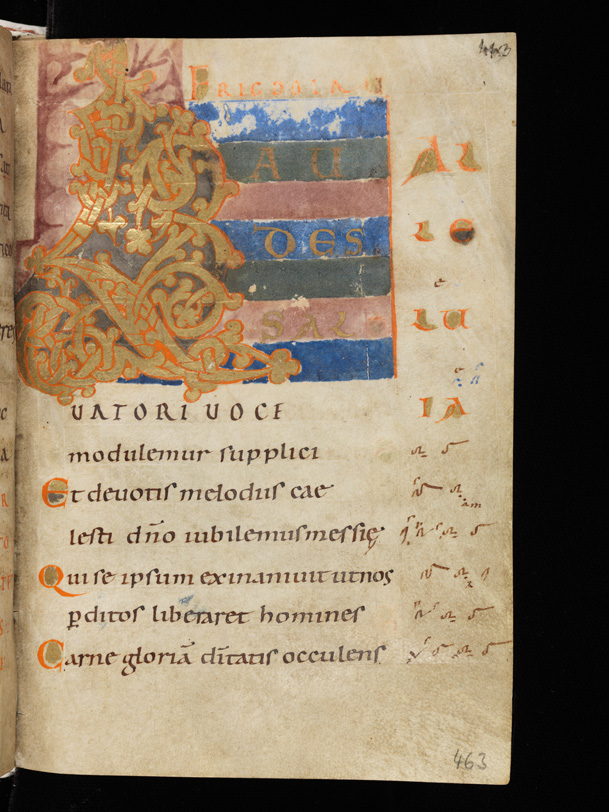
The sequence Laudes Salvatori voce modulemur supplici (in Codex Einsidlensis 121), from whose initial word the term "Low Sunday" may derive.

Another name traditionally given to this day in the English language is Low Sunday. The word "low" may serve to contrast it with the "high" festival of Easter on the preceding Sunday. Or, the word "low" may be a corruption of the Latin word laudes, (' praises ', to ' laud '), the first word of a sequence used in the historical Sarum Rite.

== Divine Mercy Sunday ==
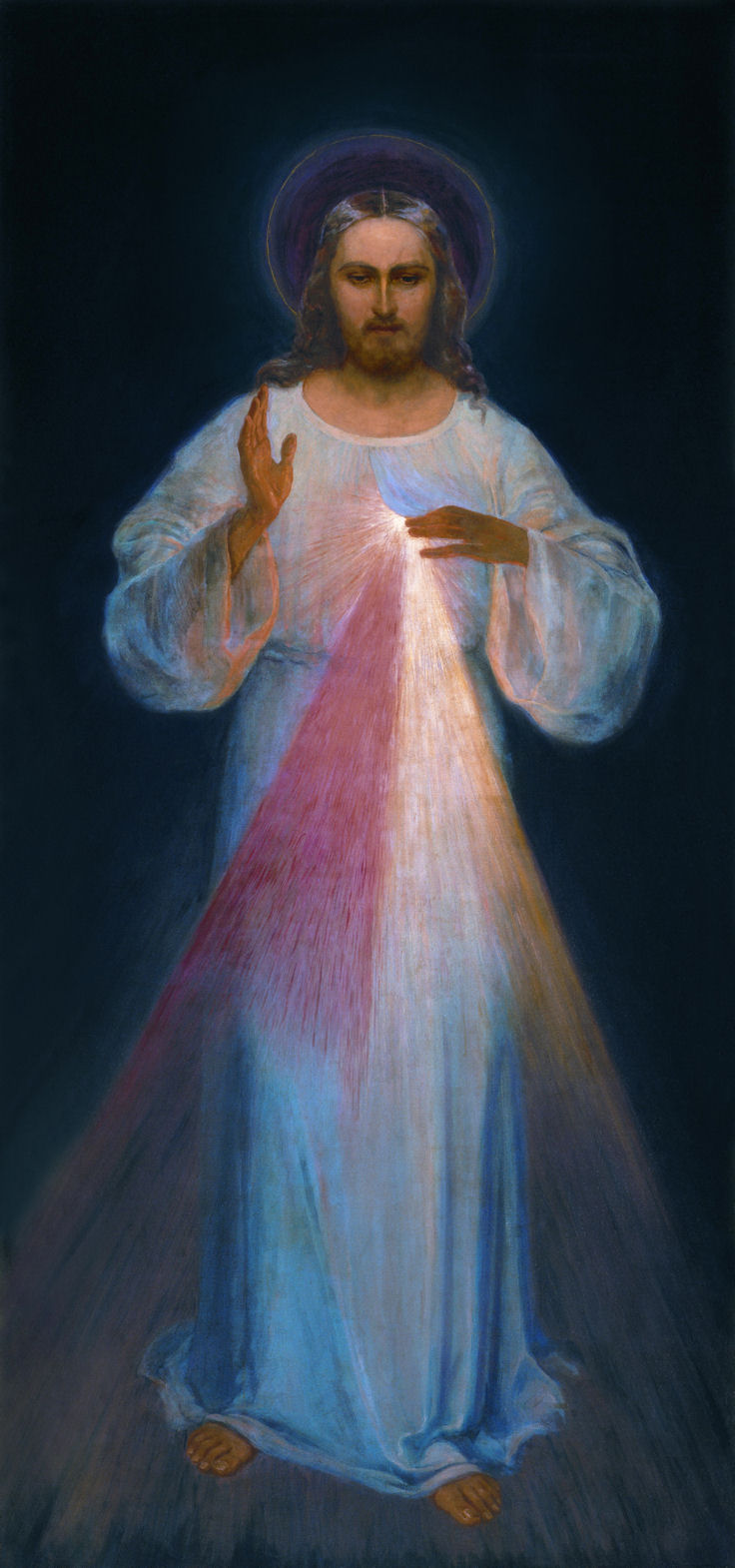
Divine Mercy by Eugene Kazimierowski (1934)

On April 30, 2000, Pope John Paul II designated the Second Sunday of Easter as Divine Mercy Sunday, based on a petition by St. Faustina Kowalska (1905–1938), who said that Jesus had made this request of the Church in an apparition. In the Roman Missal, the official title of this day is "Second Sunday of Easter; or, Sunday of Divine Mercy" (Latin: Dominica II Paschæ seu de divina Misericordia.)

Five years later, Pope John Paul II died the evening before Divine Mercy Sunday, on Saturday, April 2, 2005. His successor, Pope Benedict XVI, beatified him also on a Divine Mercy Sunday, on May 1, 2011.

== Celebrations ==
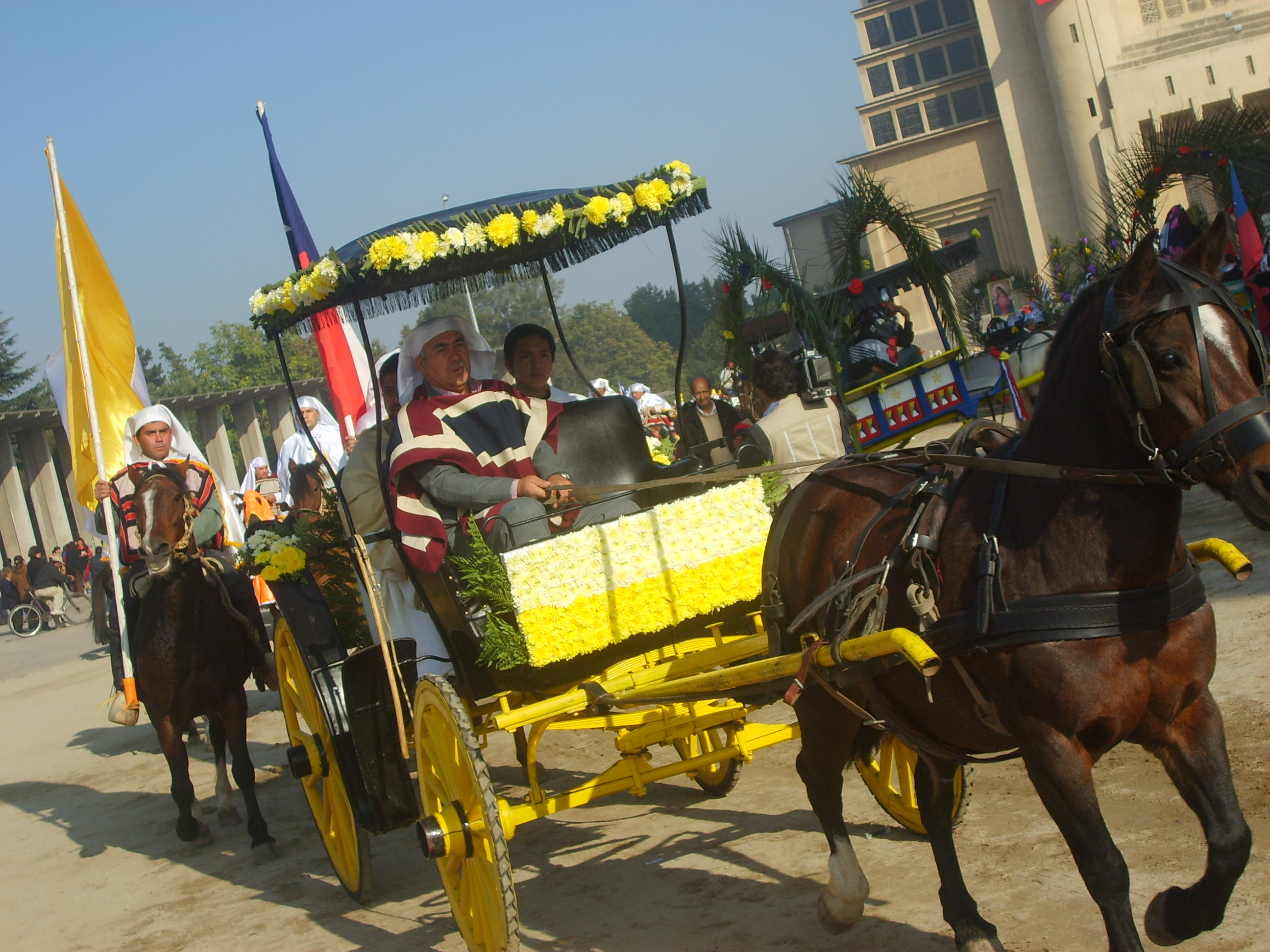
A celebration of La festividad de Cuasimodo in Chile.

In the Catholic Church, special Divine Mercy celebrations often take place on this day, and the Sacrament of Reconciliation is often administered.

The Italian feast of Our Lady of the Hens and the Chilean Cuasimodo festival are held on this day. Both festivals include Eucharistic processions.

Dates

The Second Sunday of Easter falls 7 days after Easter, between March 29 and May 2 respectively.

== Eastern Christianity ==
In Eastern Christianity, this Sunday is called Antipascha, meaning "in place of Easter". It is also called Thomas Sunday due to the Gospel passage read in the Divine Liturgy. Another name for this day in Eastern Christianity is "New Sunday". This Sunday has many hallmarks of a Great Feast, despite not actually being one. For example, no Resurrection texts from the Octoechos are sung, there is a Polyeleos and magnification, the Matins Gospel is read from the Royal Doors and there is no veneration of the Gospel Book, and the Great Prokimenon 'Who is so great a God as our God?' is sung at Vespers on Sunday evening.

== In popular culture ==
- Quasimodo, the fictional protagonist of Victor Hugo's 1831 French novel Notre Dame de Paris (or The Hunchback of Notre Dame), was, in the novel, found by Claude Frollo abandoned on the doorsteps of Notre Dame Cathedral on the Sunday after Easter. In the words of the story: "He baptized his adopted child and called him Quasimodo, either because he wanted to indicate thereby the day on which he had found him, or because he wanted the name to typify just how incomplete and half-finished the poor little creature was."

== See also ==
- Octave of Easter
- Bright Week

== Notes ==
Sundays of the Easter cycle
Preceded by Easter	Second Sunday of Easter; April 12, 2026	Succeeded by Third Sunday of Easter
