= Good Shepherd Cathedral School =

Roman Catholic school in Quezon City, Philippines

- Paaralang Katedral ng Mabuting Pastol (Filipino)
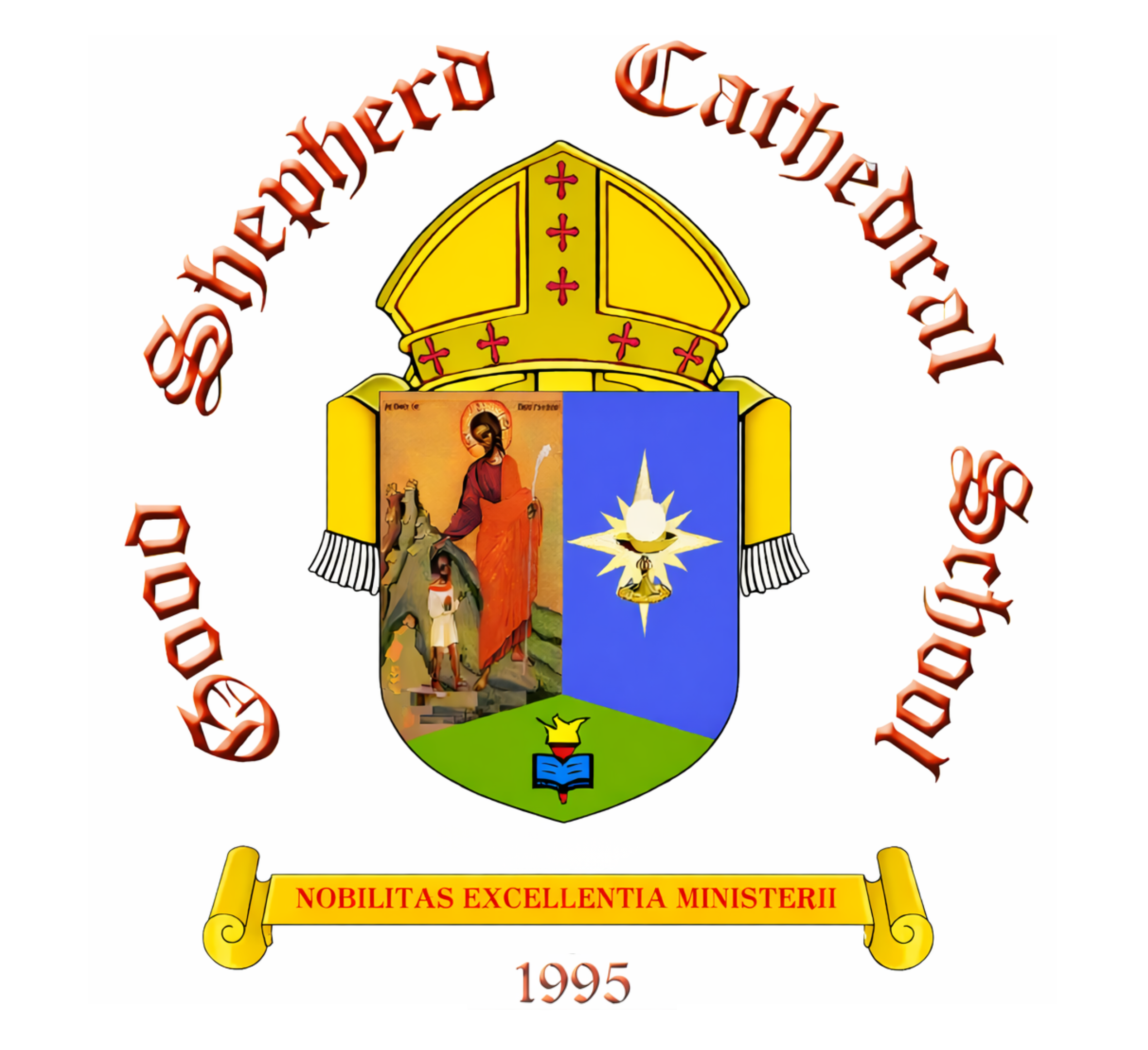

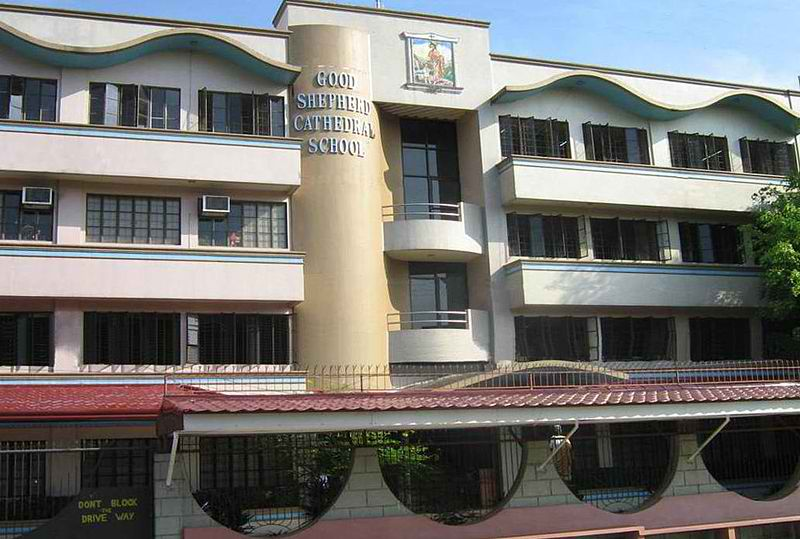
- Facade of GSCS Main Building

Location
- Omega Avenue corner Rado Street, Fairview; Quezon City, Metro Manila 1118; Philippines
- 14°41′50″N 121°4′0″E

Information
- Type: Private, Parochial school
- Motto: Nobilitas, Excellentia, Ministerii (Latin) (Nobility of Character, Academic Excellence, Compassionate Service)
- Religious affiliation: Roman Catholic Diocese of Novaliches
- Patron saint: Jesus, the Good Shepherd
- Established: 1995
- Founder: Rev. Msgr. Fidelis Ruben F. Limcaco (+)
- Director: Rev. Fr. Albert N. Delvo, Ph.D.
- Principal: Mr. Marco Paolo M. Lovendino, MMEM
- Gender: Co-educational
- Color: Red White
- Song: GSCS Hymn
- Nickname: Shepherds
- Accreditation: PAASCU
- Newspaper: The Flock / Ang Kawan
- Affiliations: RCBNES, MaPSA, CEAP
- Website: www.goodshepherdcathedralschool.edu.ph

Good Shepherd Cathedral School (GSCS) is a Filipino Catholic school located at the corner of Omega Avenue and Rado Street in West Fairview, Quezon City, Philippines. It is a private sectarian school situated at the back of the Cathedral Shrine and Parish of the Good Shepherd, the seat of the Bishop of Novaliches. The school is Level II-accredited by the Philippine Accrediting Association of Schools, Colleges and Universities (PAASCU).

GSCS is a member-school of the Roman Catholic Bishop of Novaliches Educational System (RCBNES), the Manila Ecclesiastical Province School Systems Association (MaPSA), and of the Catholic Educational Association of the Philippines (CEAP).

== History ==
Good Shepherd Cathedral School, formerly known as Good Shepherd Parish Academy or GSPA, began as a preschool in 1995. Founded by the erstwhile pastor of the Good Shepherd Parish, Msgr. Fidelis Ruben F. Limcaco, it was simply known then as Good Shepherd Parish Learning Center. The school was part of the many projects that Msgr. Fidelis had undertaken in his 27 years of pastoral service to the parishioners of Fairview. With the help of Dr. Carina G. Dacanay, the school's founding principal, the school has grown and developed complete services of preschool and grade school.

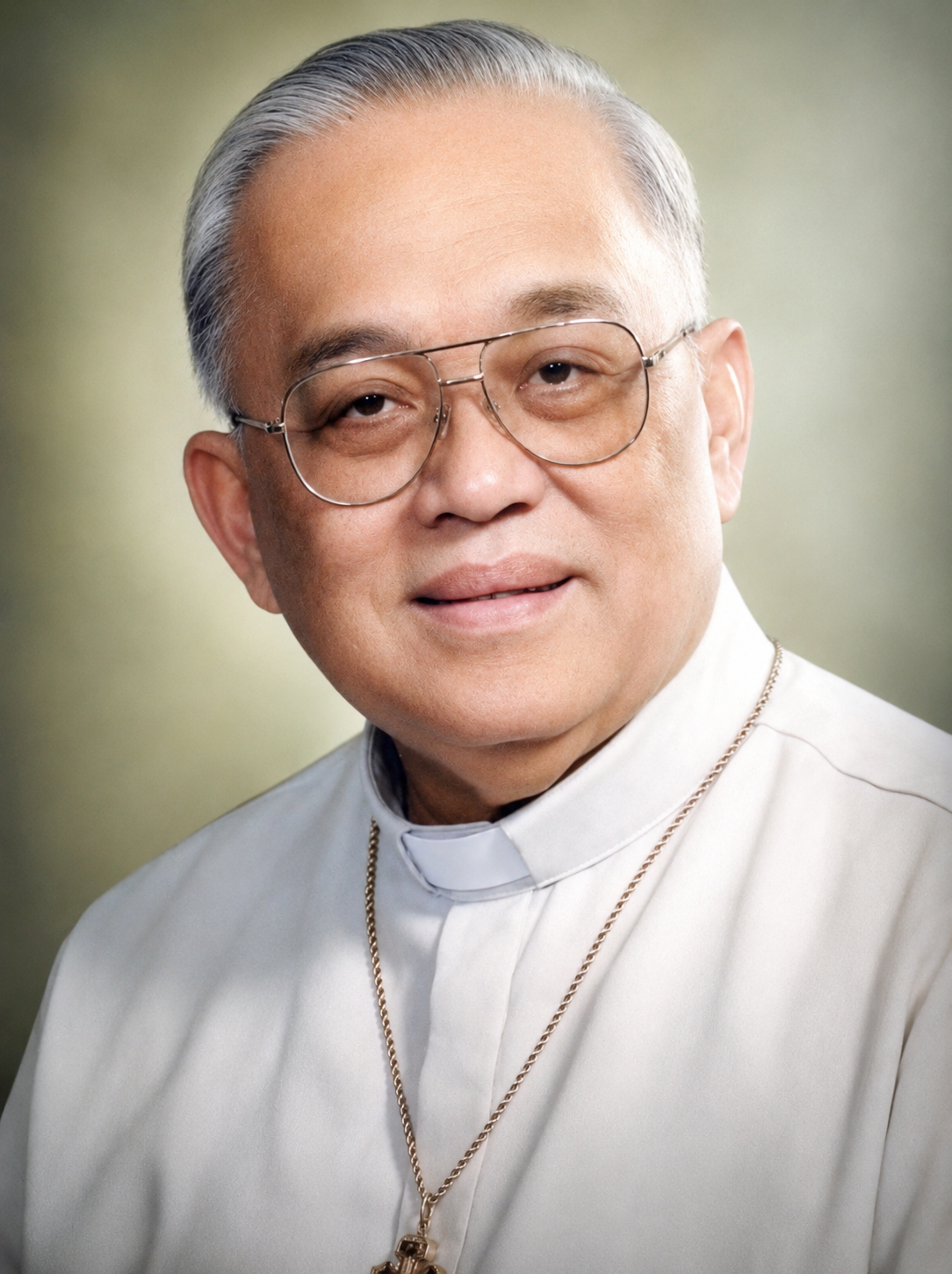
Rev. Msgr. Fidelis Ruben F. Limcaco (+) School Director, 1995 - 2002

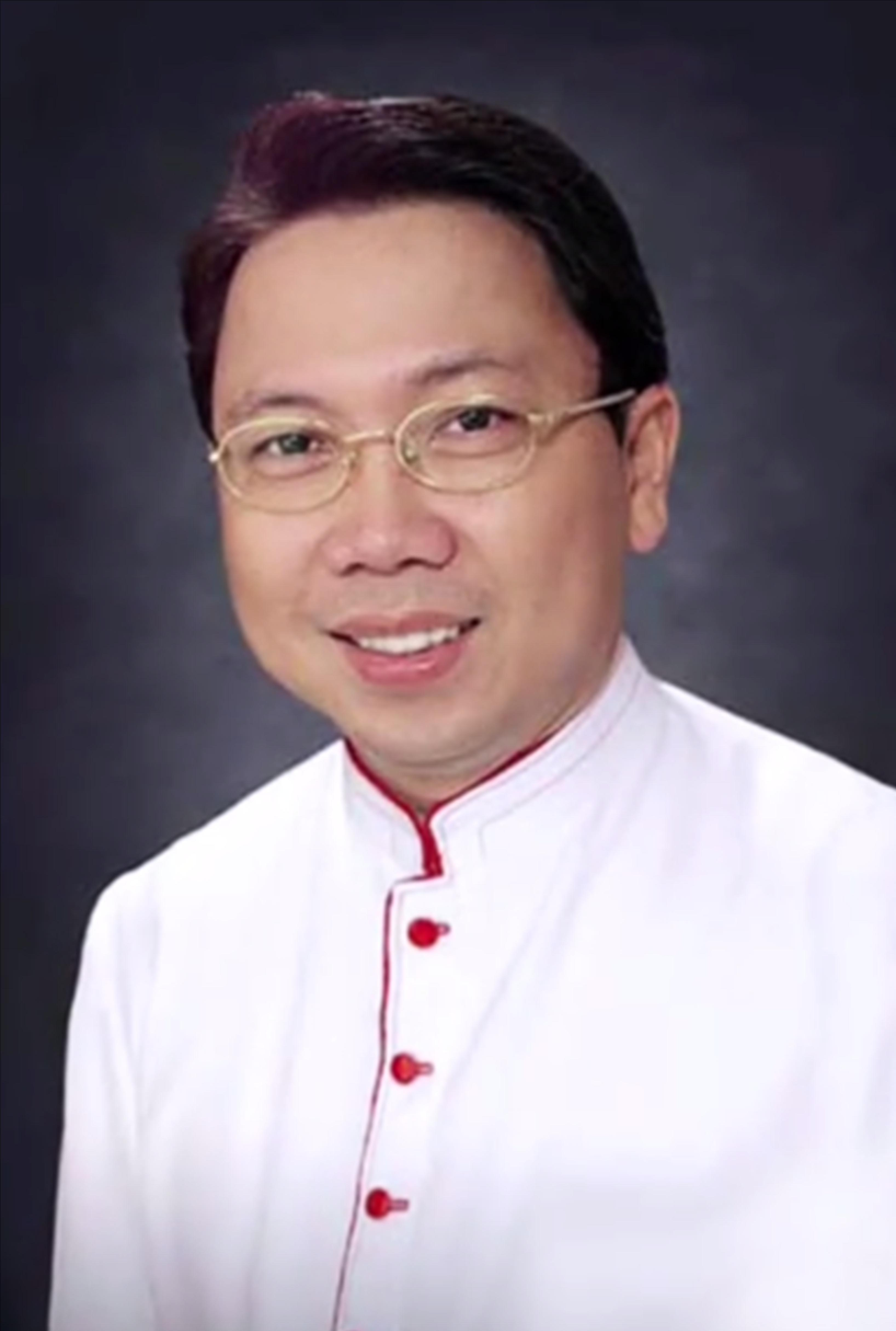
Rev. Msgr. Jesus Romulo C. Rañada School Director, 2002 - 2007

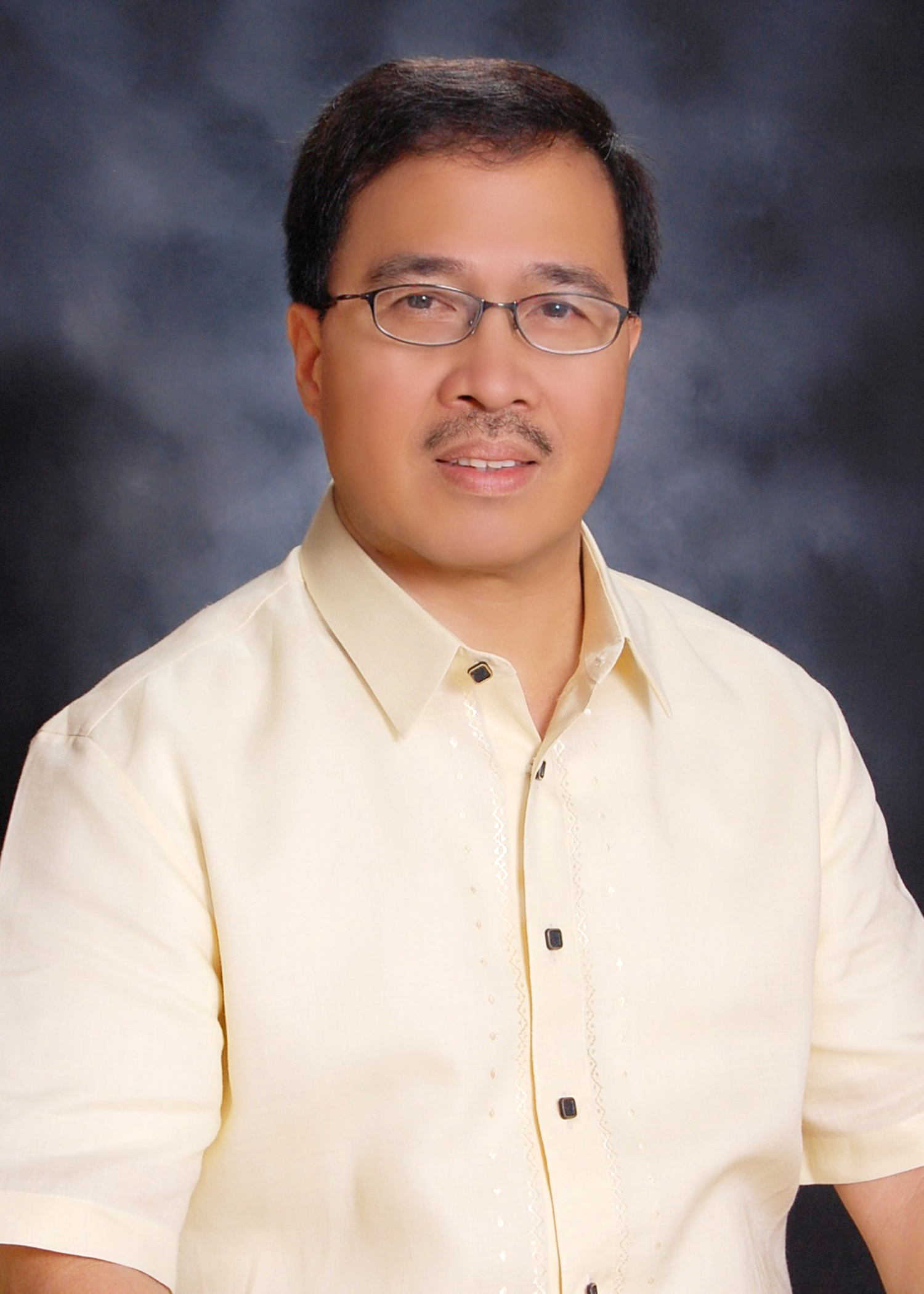
Rev. Fr. Albert N. Delvo School Director, 2007 - present

On August 1, 2002, upon the retirement of Msgr. Fidelis, Msgr. Jesus Romulo C. Rañada, the former Rector of San Carlos Seminary, took over the directorship of the school. It was during his time that the school expanded further and established a high school and a Center for Integral Evangelization (CIE). It was also during Msgr. Rañada's term that the GSCS Main Building (presently known as Bishop Teodoro Bacani Building) was built. In 2003, after the Good Shepherd Parish was elevated to the status of a cathedral of the newly established Diocese of Novaliches, the school was renamed as Good Shepherd Cathedral School.

On May 13, 2007, Most Rev. Antonio R. Tobias, D.D., Bishop Emeritus of Novaliches, appointed Rev. Fr. Albert N. Delvo as the school's new Director, in concurrent capacity as superintendent of the diocesan schools of Novaliches. Fr. Delvo's coming signified the direction of Bishop Tobias towards unification of all the diocesan schools under one directorship. Fr. Delvo made possible the construction of a new four-story building named as the HEART Building (His Excellency Antonio R. Tobias Building) to accommodate the steadily growing enrollment.

The School Year 2012-2013 witnessed the school's initial implementation of the K to 12 Enhanced Basic Education Curriculum, in line with the national government's effort of improving the quality of basic education in the country.

In 2013, the school was given certification by the Private Education Assistance Committee - Fund for Assistance to Private Education (PEAC-FAPE). The certification serves as a quality assurance that the school complies with the minimum standards set by the Department of Education and qualifies it to the Educational Service Contracting (ESC) Program of the government.

On November 17–18, 2014, the Philippine Accrediting Association of Schools, Colleges and Universities (PAASCU) conducted its preliminary visit to GSCS as part of the school's accreditation of its integrated basic education program. In the following year, PAASCU granted the school ‘candidate status’, which subsequently culminated in the awarding of Level I accreditation in 2017.

In 2015, the school was granted permit by the Department of Education to offer Senior High School (Grades 11 and 12) beginning School Year 2016–2017. It was also during this year that the current vision-mission and core values of the school were introduced.

Beginning School Year 2018–2019, GSCS has adopted the Whole Child Approach as a pedagogical paradigm. An initiative by the US-based Association for Supervision and Curriculum Development (ASCD), the Whole Child Approach promotes a holistic and long-term development and success for students as guided by five (5) important tenets - that is, every learner must be healthy, safe, engaged, supported and challenged.

In 2022, upon the retirement of Dr. Dacanay, Rev. Fr. Noel V. Elorde, Vice Director for Catholic Christian Formation of RCBNES, was appointed as new School Principal of GSCS. It was also during this year that the school was given a Level II re-accreditation by PAASCU, valid until 2027.

In 2023, renovation work on the Cardinal Sin Building commenced in response to the school’s steadily increasing student population. The newly refurbished four-story facility was formally blessed and inaugurated by the Most Rev. Roberto O. Gaa, D.D., Bishop of Novaliches, on January 28, 2025. It now features 14 additional classrooms, an expanded school clinic, and upgraded, more spacious Science laboratories.

== Levels Offered ==
(As of School Year 2026 - 2027)

Early Childhood Education (ECE)

- Pre-Kinder
- Kindergarten

Primary School

- Grades 1-3

Middle School

- Grades 4-6

Junior High School

- Grades 7-10

Senior High School

- Grades 11-12

Senior High School Strands

- Science, Technology, Engineering and Mathematics (STEM)
- Humanities and Social Sciences (HUMSS)
- Accountancy, Business, and Management (ABM)
