= Fourth Sunday of Easter =

- Also called: Good Shepherd Sunday
- Observed by: Christians
- Observances: Church services
- Date: Three weeks after Easter Day
- 2025 date: May 11 (Western); May 11 (Eastern)
- 2026 date: April 26 (Western); May 3 (Eastern)
- 2027 date: April 18 (Western); May 23 (Eastern)
- 2028 date: May 7 (Western); May 7 (Eastern)

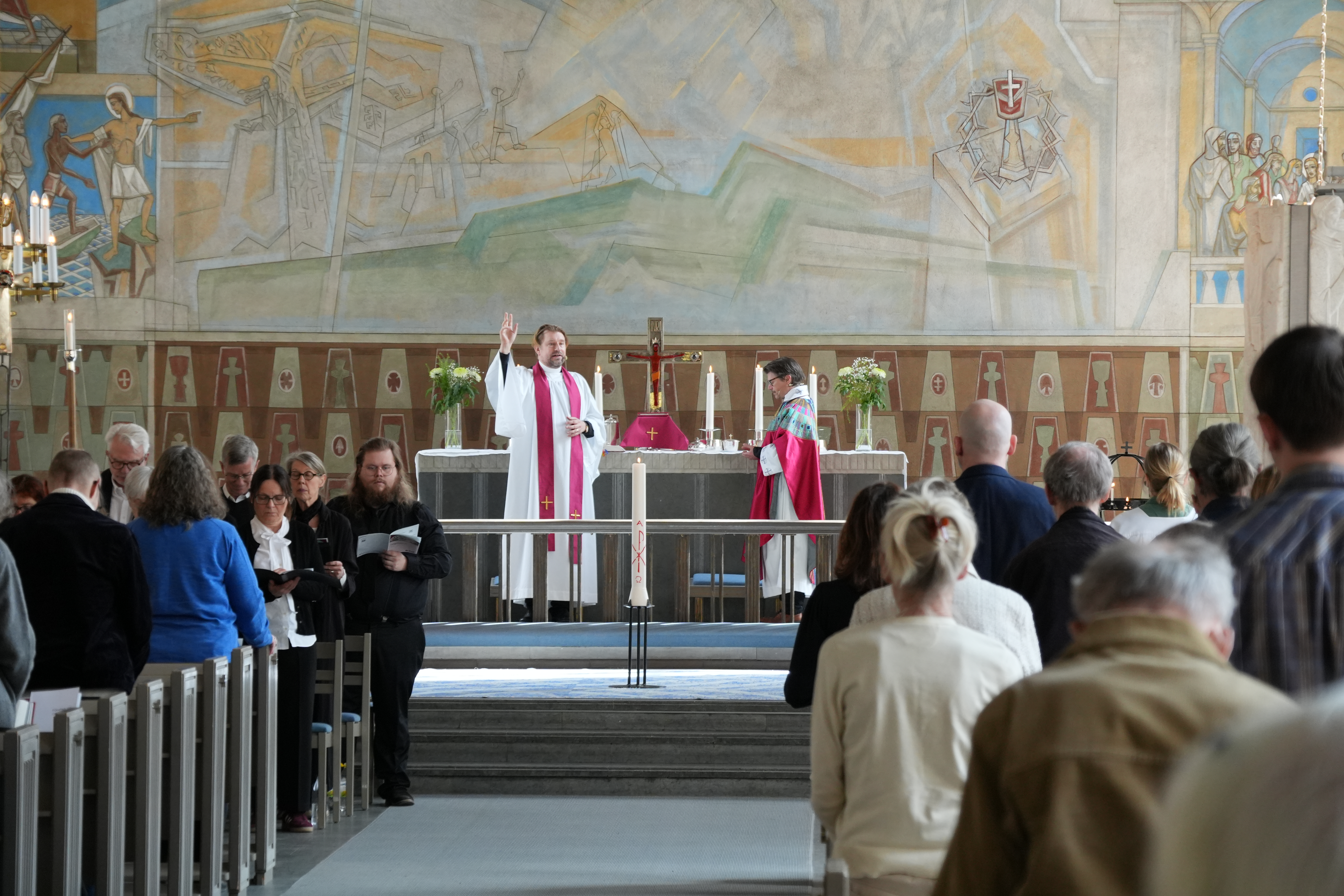
An Evangelical-Lutheran priest of the Church of Sweden imparts the final blessing at the conclusion of Mass at Saint George's Church in Stockholm, Sweden

The Fourth Sunday of Easter (or the Fourth Sunday of Eastertide) is the fourth Sunday of the Easter season, being the day that occurs three weeks after the Christian celebration of Easter.

== Western Christianity ==
=== Tridentine Catholicism (pre-1970) ===
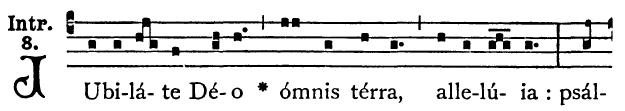
The incipit of the Gregorian chant introit Jubilate Deo.

In the historical Roman Rite of the Catholic Church, this day was officially known as the Third Sunday after Easter. It was also nicknamed Jubilate Sunday due to the incipit ("Iubilate Deo") of the introit assigned to this day. The full text of the introit in its original Latin was: "Iubilate Deo, omnis terra, allelúia: psalmum dícite nómini eius, allelúia, allelúia, allelúia. Dícite Deo, quam terribília sunt ópera tua, Dómine! in multitúdine virtútis tuæ mentiéntur tibi inimíci tui." This introit is based on Psalm 65:1–3 (which is now more commonly called Psalm 66 in accord with the Hebrew numbering used in modern Bibles).

For a brief period of time (1847–1911), this Sunday was also celebrated as the Solemnity of St. Joseph, Patron of the Universal Church. In 1911, this feast day was moved to the following Wednesday, where it remained until it was suppressed altogether in 1955.

=== Post-Vatican II Catholicism (1970–present) ===
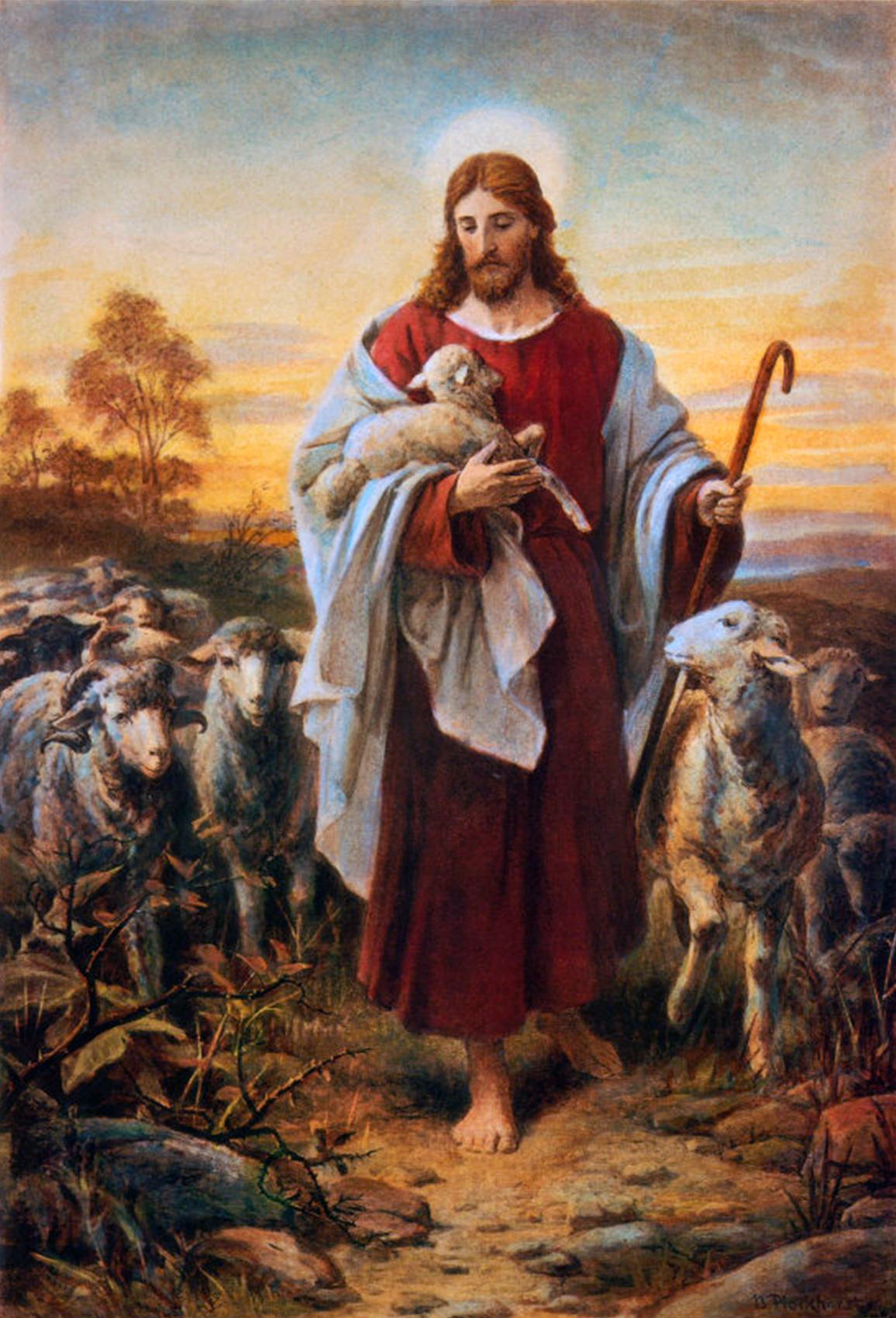
The painting The Good Shepherd by Bernhard Plockhorst

In the 1970 revision of the Roman Missal, this day was designated the "Fourth Sunday of Easter," and the "Iubilate Deo" introit for this Sunday was swapped with that of the preceding Sunday. The preceding Sunday's Gospel reading was likewise moved forward to this day. Because this Gospel reading is the parable of the Good Shepherd, the Fourth Sunday of Easter is now also known as Good Shepherd Sunday (a name formerly given to the Third Sunday of Easter to which the reading was originally assigned).

In 1964, Pope Paul VI established a World Day of Prayer for Vocations to coincide with Good Shepherd Sunday, now celebrated on the Fourth Sunday of Easter. For this reason, this day is also known in the Catholic Church as Vocations Sunday. The Church of England also celebrates Vocations Sunday on this day.

=== Lutheranism ===
Johann Sebastian Bach composed three church cantatas for the Lutheran celebration of Jubilate Sunday. These cantatas incorporated the readings traditionally prescribed for this day: the epistle (1 Peter 2:11–19) and the Gospel (John 16:16–22).

- Weinen, Klagen, Sorgen, Zagen, BWV 12, April 22, 1714
- Ihr werdet weinen und heulen, BWV 103, April 22, 1725
- Wir müssen durch viel Trübsal, BWV 146, May 12, 1726, or April 18, 1728

In the Revised Common Lectionary currently used by many Lutherans, the Gospel reading is the Good Shepherd passage.

== Eastern Christianity ==
In the Greek Orthodox Church, this day is called the Fourth Sunday of Holy Pascha, and is also called the Sunday of the Paralytic due to the Gospel passage (John 5:1–15) read on this day.

== See also ==
- Eastertide – Festal season in the liturgical year of Christianity

Sundays of the Easter cycle
Preceded by Third Sunday of Easter	Fourth Sunday of Easter; April 26, 2026	Succeeded by Fifth Sunday of Easter
