= Third Sunday of Easter =

Christian event

- Also called: Misericordia Sunday; Good Shepherd Sunday
- Observed by: Christians
- Observances: Church services
- Date: Two weeks after Easter Day
- 2025 date: May 4 (Western); May 4 (Eastern)
- 2026 date: April 19 (Western); April 26 (Eastern)
- 2027 date: April 11 (Western); May 16 (Eastern)
- 2028 date: April 30 (Western); April 30 (Eastern)

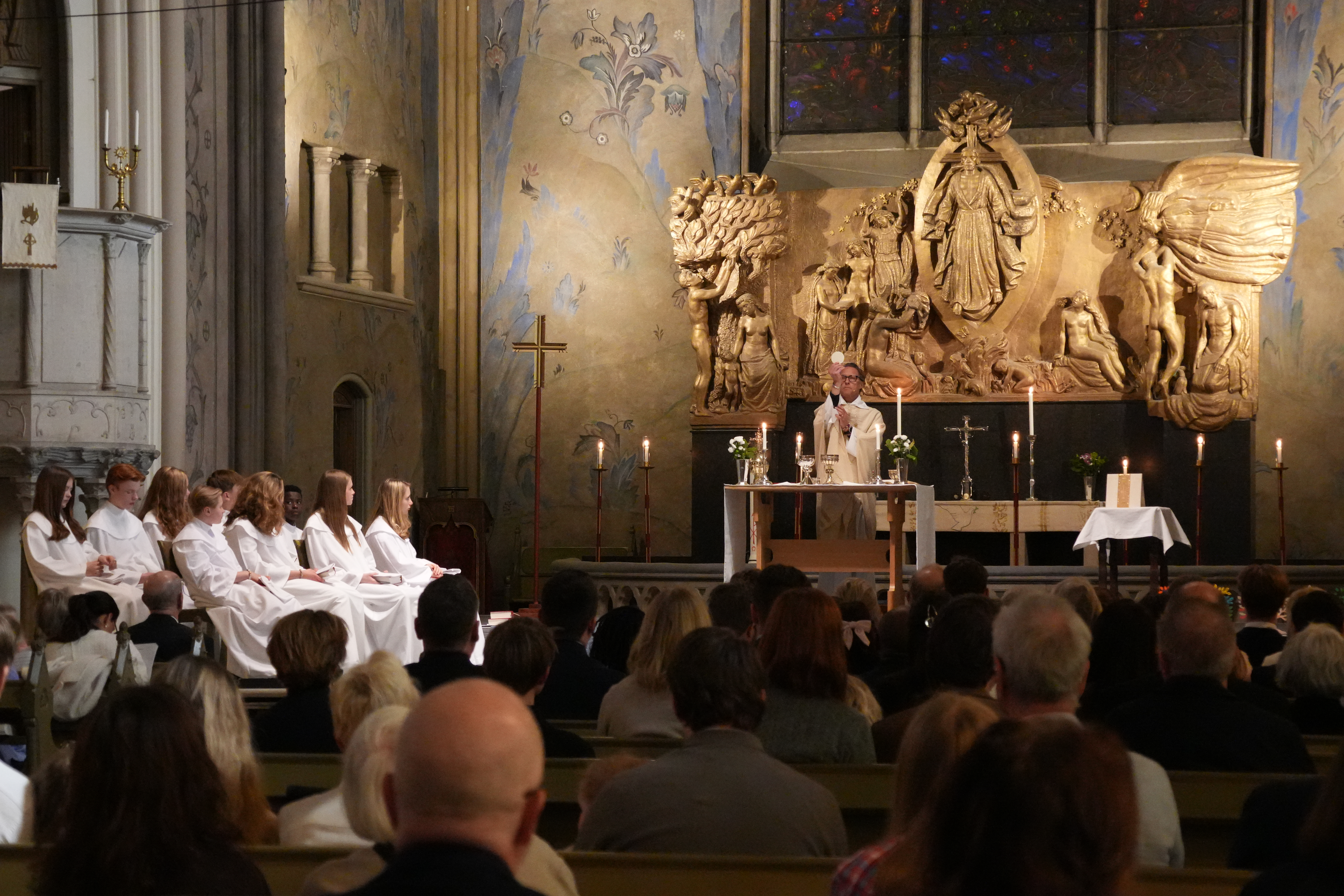
A priest of the Church of Sweden elevates the host before the congregation during a Confirmation Mass at Oscar's Evangelical-Lutheran Church on the Third Sunday of Eastertide.

The Third Sunday of Easter or Third Sunday of Eastertide is the third Sunday of the Easter season, being the day that occurs two weeks after the Christian celebration of Easter Sunday. It is also known as Good Shepherd Sunday.

== Western Christianity ==
The incipit of the Gregorian chant introit Misericordia Domini in the Liber Usualis

In the traditional Roman Rite of the Catholic Church, this day is officially the Second Sunday after Easter, also known as Misericordia Sunday and Good Shepherd Sunday. "Misericordia Sunday" is due to the incipit ("Misericórdia Dómini") of the introit assigned to this day's liturgy. The full text of the introit in Latin is: "Misericórdia Dómini plena est terra, allelúia: verbo Dómini caeli firmáti sunt, allelúia, allelúia. Exsultáte, iusti, in Dómino: rectos decet collaudátio." This introit is based on verses 5, 6, and 1 of Psalm 33. "Good Shepherd Sunday" is due to the Gospel reading assigned to it (John 10:11–16).

In the 1970 revision of the Roman Missal, this day was designated the "Third Sunday of Easter". The "Misericórdia Dómini" introit for this Sunday was swapped with that of the following Sunday, and the "Good Shepherd" Gospel reading was likewise moved forward one week.

In the Lutheran churches, the Second Sunday of Easter, according to The Lutheran Missal, is known as Good Shepherd Sunday and "gives us Jesus’ description of Himself as the Good Shepherd who lays down His life for the sheep."

=== Local celebrations ===
On some local liturgical calendars (such as that of the Capuchins and that of the Archdiocese of Seville), this Sunday was formerly known as the Feast of Our Lady, Mother of the Good Shepherd. (The Archdiocese of Seville now celebrates this feast as a memorial on the following Saturday.)

In Jerusalem and among the Franciscans, this Sunday was formerly celebrated as the Feast of the Holy Sepulchre.

== Eastern Christianity ==
In the Greek Orthodox Church, this day is called the Sunday of the Myrrhbearers.

Armenian Christianity celebrates on this day the dedication of the first Christian church on Mount Zion.

== See also ==
- Eastertide

Sundays of the Easter cycle
Preceded by Second Sunday of Easter	Third Sunday of Easter; April 19, 2026	Succeeded by Fourth Sunday of Easter
