= Eastertide =

Festal season in the liturgical year of Christianity

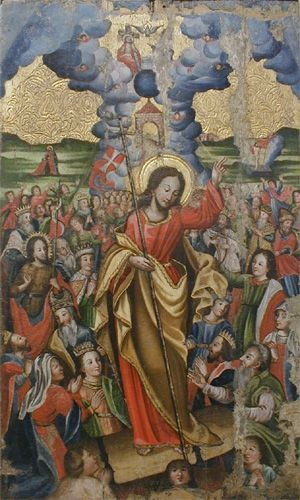
Resurrection – Descent into Hell, 17th century image from Disna, National Art Museum

Eastertide (also known as Eastertime or the Easter season) or Paschaltide (also known as Paschaltime or the Paschal season) is a festal season in the liturgical year of Christianity that focuses on celebrating the Resurrection of Jesus Christ. Preceded by Lent, it begins on Easter Day, which initiates Easter Week in Western Christianity, and Bright Week in Eastern Christianity.

There are several Eastertide customs across the Christian world, including flowering the cross, sunrise services, the wearing of Easter bonnets by women, exclaiming the Paschal greeting, clipping the church, and decorating Easter eggs, a symbol of new life, and the empty tomb. Additional Eastertide traditions include egg hunting, eating special Easter foods and watching Easter parades. The Easter lily, a symbol of the resurrection in Christianity, traditionally decorates the chancel area of churches on this day and for the rest of Eastertide.

Traditionally lasting 40 days to commemorate the time the resurrected Jesus remained on earth before his Ascension, in some western churches, Eastertide lasts 50 days to conclude on the day of Pentecost or Whitsunday.

== Western Christianity ==
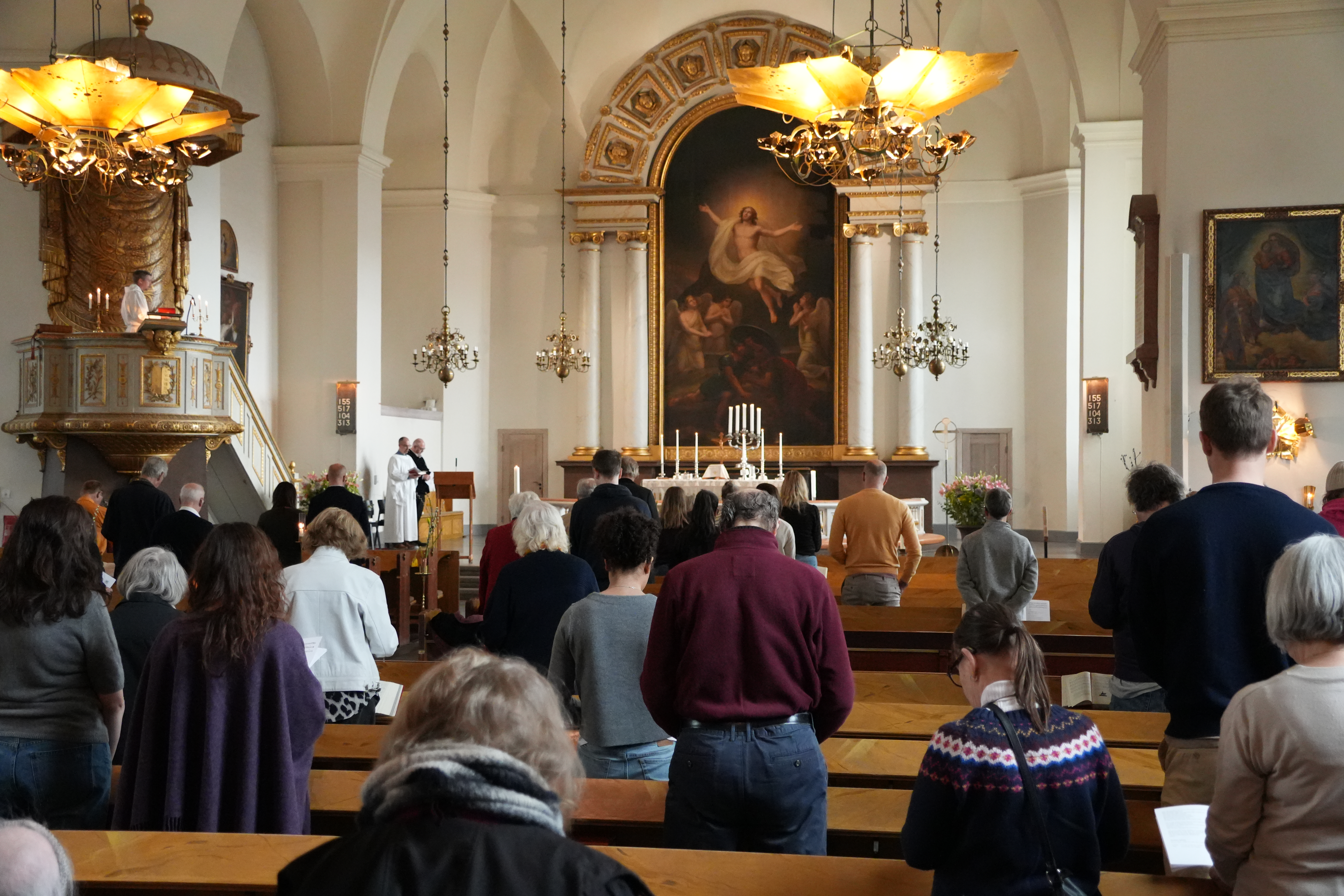
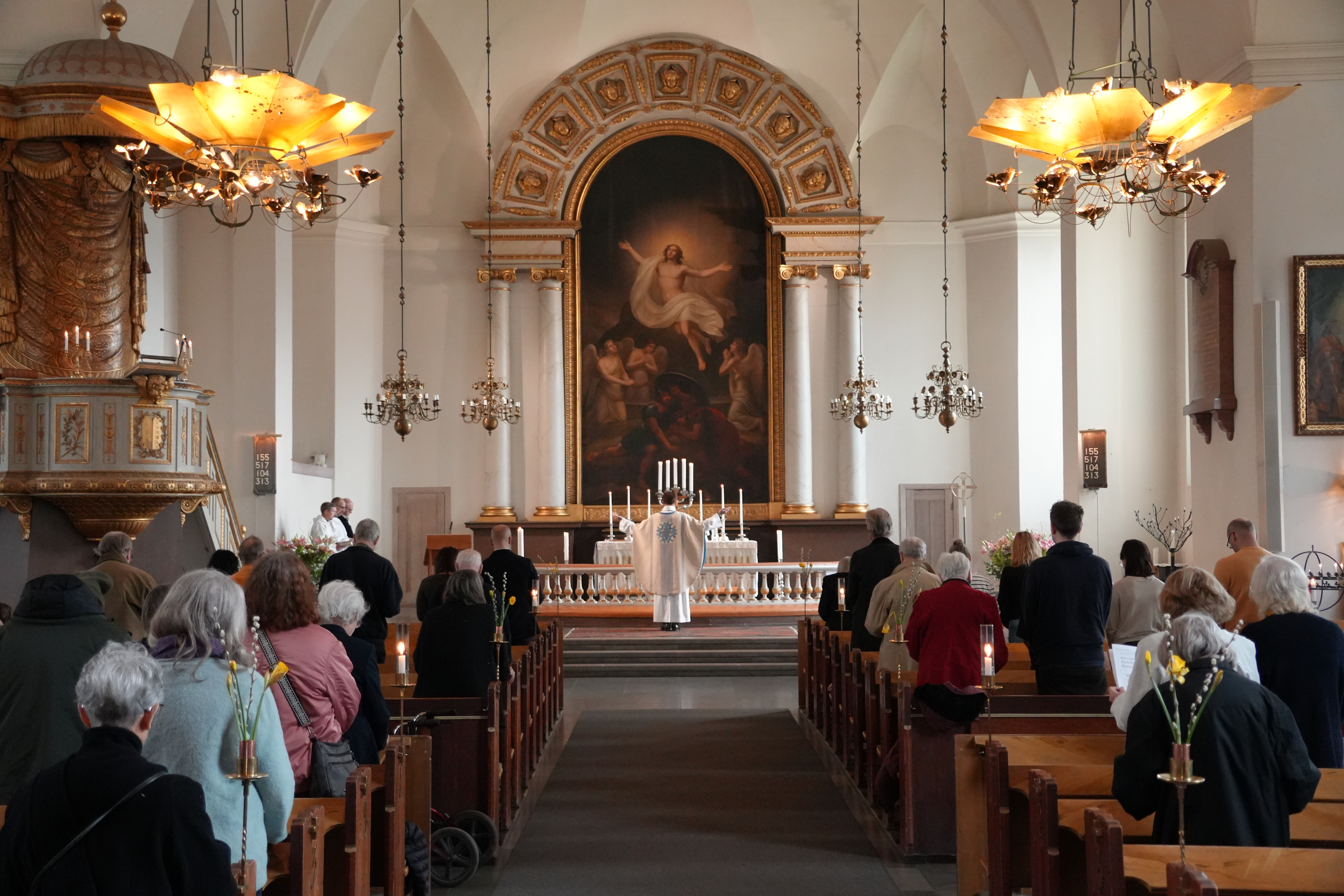
The celebration of Easter Monday Mass by Evangelical-Lutheran priests at Kungsholm Church, part of the Diocese of Stockholm in the Church of Sweden

Easter time is the period of 50 days, spanning from Easter Sunday to Pentecost Sunday. It is celebrated as a single joyful feast, called the "great Lord's Day". Each Sunday of the season is treated as a Sunday of Easter. In some traditions, Easter Sunday is the first Sunday of Eastertide and the following Sunday (Low Sunday) is the second Sunday of Eastertide and so on.

Easter Sunday and Pentecost correspond to pre-existing Jewish feasts: The first day of Pesach (פסח) and the holiday of Shavu'ot (שבועות). In the Jewish tradition, the 49 days between these holidays are known as Counting of the Omer (ספירת העומר).

The first eight days constitute the Octave of Easter and are celebrated as solemnities of the Lord.

Since 2000, the Second Sunday of Easter is also called Divine Mercy Sunday. The name "Low Sunday" for this Sunday, once common in English, is now used mainly in the Church of England.

The solemnity of the Ascension of the Lord is celebrated on the 40th day of Eastertide (a Thursday), except in countries where it is not a Holy Day of Obligation. In such countries it is celebrated on the following Sunday (the 43rd day of Eastertide). The nine days from that feast until the Saturday before Pentecost (inclusive) are days of preparation for the Holy Spirit the Paraclete, which inspired the form of prayer called a novena.

Before the 1969 revision of the calendar, the Sundays were called First Sunday after Easter, Second Sunday after Easter, etc. The Sunday preceding the feast of the Ascension of the Lord was sometimes, although not officially, called Rogation Sunday, and when the Ascension had an octave, the following Sunday was called Sunday within the Octave of the Ascension. When this octave was abolished in 1955, it was called Sunday after the Ascension. Pentecost was followed by an octave, which some reckoned as part of Eastertide.

When the Anglican and Lutheran churches implemented their own calendar and lectionary reforms in 1976, they adopted the same shortened definition of the Easter season as the Roman Catholic Church had promulgated six years earlier. In the Church of England, the Easter season begins with the Easter Vigil and ends after Evening Prayer (or Night Prayer) on the Day of Pentecost. Some Anglican provinces continue to label the Sundays between Easter and the Ascension "Sundays After Easter" rather than "Sundays of Easter"; others, such as the Church of England and ECUSA, use the term "Sundays of Easter". Anglican provinces and dioceses which continue to use The Book of Common Prayer (1662) as their standard of doctrine and liturgy persist in having a traditional 40 day Eastertide which concludes on Ascension Day, also known as Holy Thursday.

The Te Deum and Gloria are recited every day even in the ferial Office. On Sundays the "Asperges" is replaced by the "Vidi Aquam" which recalls the solemn baptism of Easter eve. There is no feast day from Easter until Ascension. The Armenians during this period do away even with the abstinence on Fridays. Prayers are said standing, not kneeling. Instead of the "Angelus" the "Regina Caeli" is recited. From Easter to Ascension many churches, about the tenth century, said only one Nocturn at Matins; even some particular churches in the city of Rome adopted this custom from the Teutons (Bäumer, "Gesch. des Breviers", 312).

Pope Gregory VII limited this privilege to the week of Easter and of Pentecost. Some dioceses in Germany retained it far into the nineteenth century for 40 days after Easter. In every Nocturn the three psalms are said under one antiphon. The Alleluia appears as an independent antiphon. An Alleluia is added to all the antiphons, responsories and versicles, except to the versicles of the preces at Prime and Compline. Instead of the "suffragia sanctorum" in the semidouble and ferial Offices, a commemoration of the Holy Cross is used. The iambic hymns have a special Easter doxology.

The feasts of the holy Apostles and martyrs have their own commune from Easter to Pentecost. At Mass the Alleluia is added to the Introit, Offertory and Communion; in place of the Gradual two Alleluias are sung followed by two verses, each with an Alleluia; there is also a special Preface for Paschal Time.

Paschal Tide was the period during which every member of the faithful who has attained the year of discretion was bound by the positive law of the Church to receive Holy Communion (Easter duty). During the early Middle Ages from the time of the Synod of Agde (508), it was customary to receive Holy Communion at least three times a year—Christmas, Easter and Pentecost. A positive precept was issued by the Fourth Lateran Council (1215) and confirmed by the Council of Trent (Sess. XIII, can. ix). According to these decrees the faithful of either sex, after coming to the age of discretion, must receive at least at Easter the Sacrament of the Eucharist (unless by the advice of the parish priest they abstain for a while). Otherwise during life they are to be prevented from entering the church and when dead are to be denied Christian burial. The paschal precept is to be fulfilled in one's parish church.

Although the precept of the Fourth Lateran to confess to the parish priest fell into disuse and permission was given to confess anywhere, the precept of receiving Easter Communion in the parish church was still in force where there are canonically erected parishes.

The term Paschal Tide was usually interpreted to mean the two weeks between Palm and Low Sundays (Synod of Avignon, 1337). By St. Antonine of Florence it was restricted to Easter Sunday, Monday and Tuesday. By Angelo da Chiavasso it was defined as the period from Maundy Thursday to Low Sunday. Eugene IV, 8 July 1440, authoritatively interpreted it to mean the two weeks between Palm and Low Sundays.

In later centuries the time has been variously extended: at Naples from Palm Sunday to Ascension; at Palermo from Ash Wednesday to Low Sunday. In Germany, at an early date, the second Sunday after Easter terminated Paschal Tide, for which reason it was called "Predigerkirchweih", because the hard Easter labour was over, or "Buch Sunday", the obstinate sinners putting off the fulfillment of the precept to the last day. In the United States upon petition of the Fathers of the First Provincial Council of Baltimore Paschal Tide was extended by Pius VIII to the period from the first Sunday in Lent to Trinity Sunday (II Plen. Coun. Balt., n. 257); in Canada the duration of the Paschal Tide is the same as in the United States. In England it lasts from Ash Wednesday until Low Sunday; in Ireland from Ash Wednesday until the octave of SS. Peter and Paul, 6 July.

=== Liturgical aspects ===
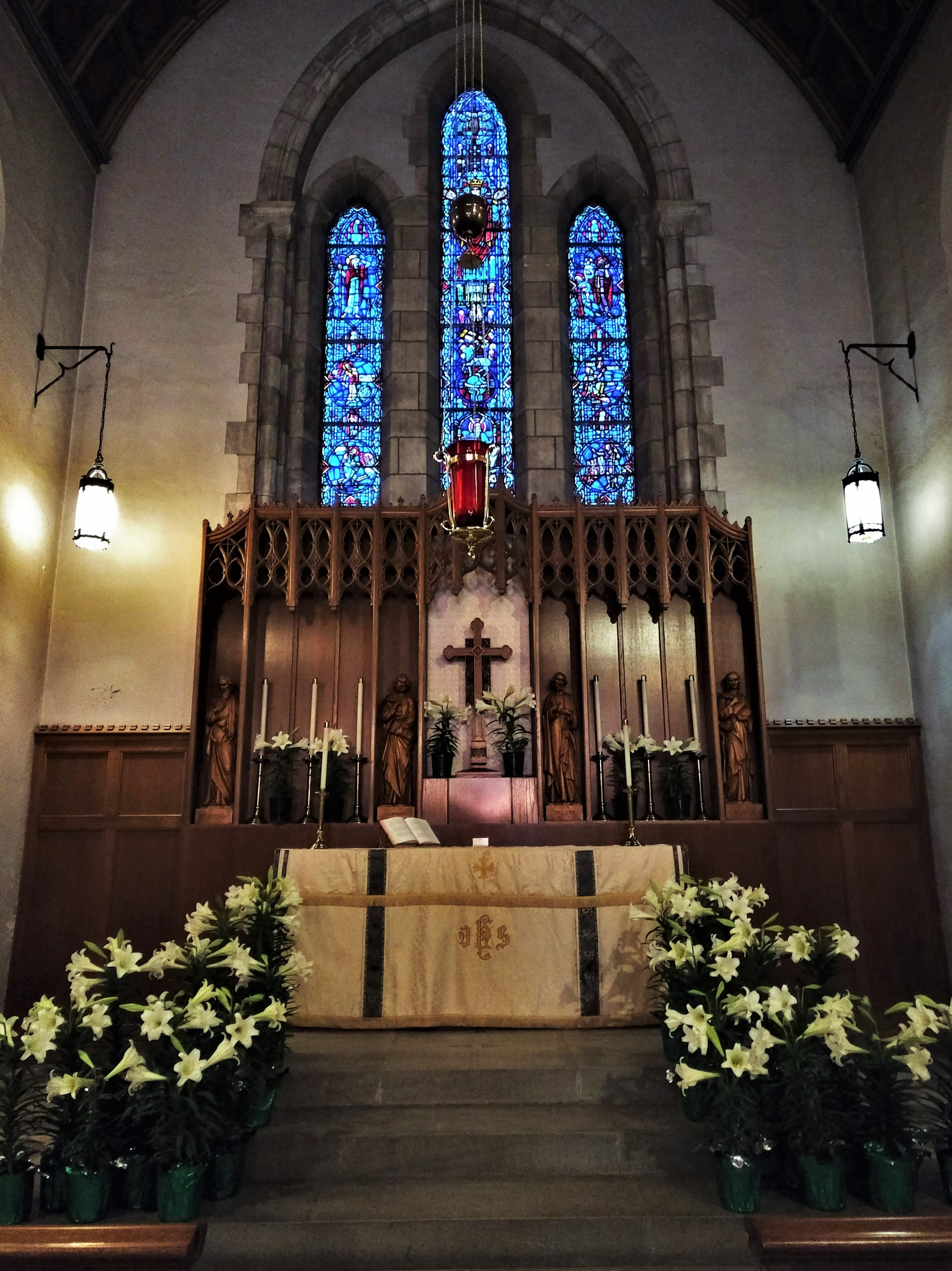
Easter lilies, a symbol of the resurrection of Jesus, adorn the chancel of a Lutheran church in Baltimore

Paschal Tide is a season of joy. The liturgical color is white (and sometimes gold), which is the color designated for feasts and festivals. The Paschal candle is lit on Easter and on Sundays during Eastertide. Eastertide ends on the Day of Pentecost. The Easter lily, a symbol of the resurrection, traditionally serve as the chancel flowers that decorate the chancel area of churches throughout Eastertide.

The Orthodox (Greek) Church celebrates on Friday of Easter Week the feast of Our Lady, the Living Fountain (shrine at Constantinople).

The Sundays from Easter to Ascension Day, besides being called the First, Second (etc.) Sunday in Easteride or after Easter Sunday, have their own peculiar titles.

==== Second Sunday ====
The Second Sunday of Easter is also known in Western Christianity as Divine Mercy Sunday, the Octave Day of Easter, White Sunday, Quasimodo Sunday, and Low Sunday. In Eastern Christianity, this day is known as Antipascha, New Sunday (or Renewal Sunday), and Thomas Sunday.

==== Third Sunday ====
Traditionally, the Third Sunday of Easter was also called Misericordia Sunday and Good Shepherd Sunday in Western Christianity. Subsequent to modern liturgical reforms, these names are often applied to the Fourth Sunday instead. In Greek Orthodoxy, this day is called the Sunday of the Myrrhbearers.

==== Fourth Sunday ====
Traditionally, the Fourth Sunday of Easter was also called Jubilate Sunday in Western Christianity. Subsequent to modern liturgical reforms, this name is often more appropriately applied to the Third Sunday instead. The Fourth Sunday of Easter is also known as Good Shepherd Sunday and Vocations Sunday. In Greek Orthodoxy, this day is called the Sunday of the Paralytic.

==== Fifth Sunday ====
The Asian Churches on Wednesday after the third Sunday celebrate with a very solemn Office and an octave, the Mesopentekoste, the completion of the first half of Paschal Tide; it is the feast of the manifestation of the Messiah; the Slav nations in this day have a solemn procession and benediction of their rivers. The fifth Sunday is called Cantate Sunday; by the Orientals it is called Sunday of the Samaritan Woman.

==== Sixth Sunday ====
The sixth Sunday, Vocem jucunditatis in Asia, Sunday of the Man Born Blind. In the Latin Church follow the Rogation Days; in the Greek Church on Tuesday is kept the apodosis or conclusion of the feast of Easter. The Greeks sing the Canons of Easter up to this Tuesday in the same manner as during Easter Week, whilst in the Latin Church the specific Easter Office terminates on Saturday following the feast. Thursday is the feast of the Ascension. The Friday of this week, in Germany, is sometimes called Witterfreitag; the fields are blessed against frost and thunderstorms.

==== Seventh Sunday ====
The Sunday that falls within the octave of Ascension is called "Exaudi" from the Introit; in some dioceses it is called Feast of Our Lady, Queen of the Apostles (double major) or of the Cenacle (first class); in Rome it was called Sunday of the Roses (Pascha rosarum or Pascha rosatum), since in the Pantheon rose-leaves were thrown from the rotunda into the church; in the Greek and Russian Churches it is the feast of the 318 Fathers of the first Nicene Council; the Armenians call it the "second feast of the flowers", a repetition of Palm Sunday.

By older liturgists the week before Pentecost is called Hebdomada expectationis, week of the expectation of the Holy Spirit. On the Vigil of Pentecost the baptismal water is blessed in the Latin Church. In the Oriental Churches, that Saturday is the psychosabbaton (All Soul's Day), upon which the Greeks bless wheat cakes and hold processions to the cemeteries.

== Eastern Christianity ==
=== Byzantine Rite ===
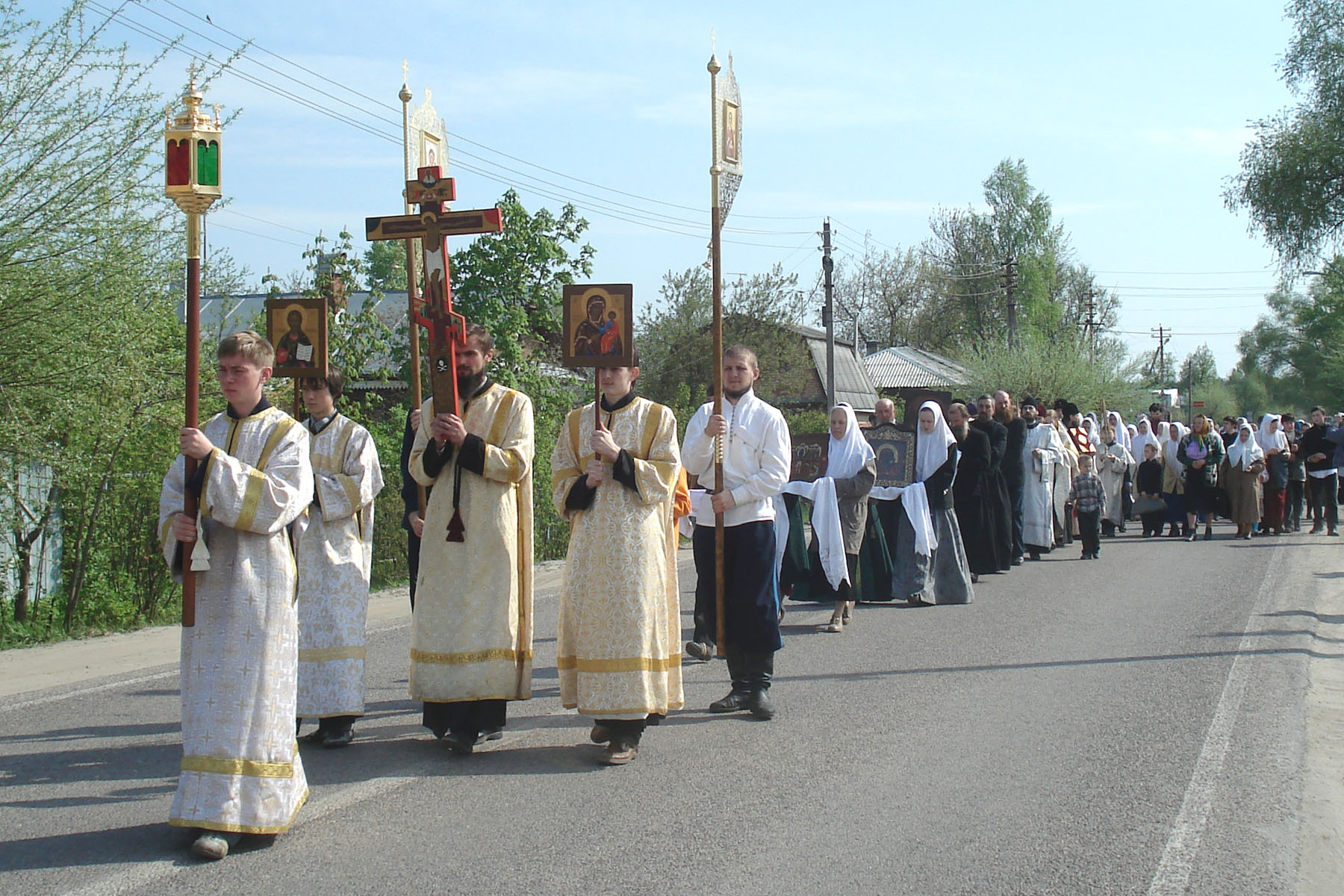
Bright Week procession (Russian Orthodox Old-Rite Church in Guslitsa)

In the Eastern Orthodox Church, Pascha begins on Easter Sunday at Matins which is normally celebrated at midnight and continues for forty days through the ninth hour on the day before the Ascension.

=== East Syriac Rite ===
The East Syriac Rite refers to Eastertide as the Season of Resurrection, also known by the Syriac transliteration Qyamta and the season runs up to the feast of Pentecost.

In this rite, the following feasts are fixed to various days of the Season of Resurrection:

- Friday after Easter: All Saints' Day
- Fourth Sunday after Easter ("Fifth Sunday of Resurrection"): Mar Addai
- Sixth Thursday after Easter: Ascension of Our Lord

The Second Sunday of Resurrection is also known as "New Sunday" or "St. Thomas Sunday".

== See also ==
- Bright Week
- Easter traditions
- Embertides
- Paschal Cycle
- Pentecostarion
