= Semla =

Nordic filled breads

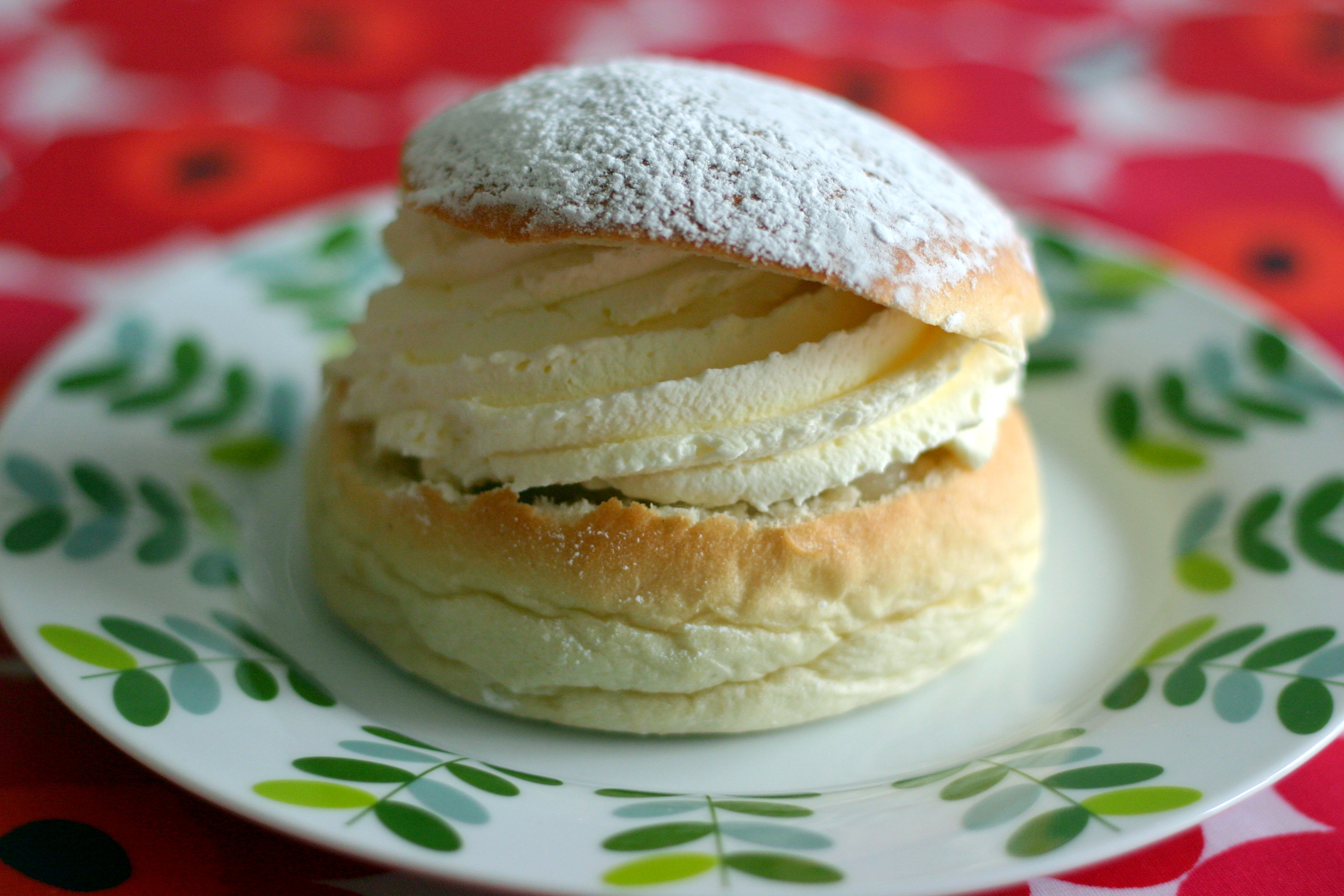
- Traditional Swedish semla
- Alternative names: laskiaispulla and Lent buns
- Type: Sweet roll
- Course: Dessert
- Place of origin: Sweden
- Region or state: Northern Europe
- Associated cuisine: Swedish cuisine
- Invented: 1500s
- Serving temperature: Medium
- Main ingredients: Wheat bread, whipped cream, and almond paste or jam.
- Ingredients generally used: Icing sugar
- Variations: hetvägg
- Food energy (per serving): 412 kcal (1,720 kJ)
Nutritional value
(per serving)
- Protein: 5.7 g
- Fat: 17 g
- Carbohydrate: 40 g
- Similar dishes: Pulla and cardamom bread

A semla, laskiaispulla, Swedish eclair, fastlagsbulle, fastelavnsbolle, vastlakukkel, or vēja kūkas is a traditional sweet roll made in various forms in Sweden, Finland, Estonia, Denmark, the Faroe Islands, Iceland, Norway, and Latvia, associated with Lent and especially Shrove Tuesday in most countries, Shrove Monday in Denmark, parts of southern Sweden, Iceland and Faroe Islands or Sunday of Fastelavn in Norway. In Sweden it is most commonly known as just semla (plural: semlor), but is also known as fettisdagsbulle, lit. 'Fat Tuesday bun' or 'Shrove Tuesday bun'. In the southern parts of Sweden, as well as in Swedish-speaking Finland, it is known as fastlagsbulle (plural: fastlagsbullar; semla on the other hand means a plain wheat bun with butter, called bulle in Swedish). In Poland it is known as ptyś. In Estonia it is called vastlakukkel. In Norway and Denmark it is called fastelavnsbolle. In Iceland, it is known as a bolla and served on Bolludagur. In Faroe Islands it is called føstulávintsbolli, and is served on føstulávintsmánadagur. In Latvia, it is called vēja kūkas. Semla served in a bowl of hot milk is hetvägg.

== Etymology ==
The name semla (plural: semlor) is a loan word from Middle Low German semmel, originally deriving from the Latin simila, meaning 'flour', itself a borrowing from Greek σεμίδαλις (semidalis), which was the name used for the finest quality wheat flour. In the southernmost part of Sweden (Scania) and by the Swedish-speaking population in Finland, they are known as fastlagsbulle. In Denmark and Norway they are known as fastelavnsbolle (fastlagen and fastelavn being the equivalent of Shrove Tuesday). In Scanian, the feast is also called fastelann. In Finnish they are known as laskiaispulla (which refers to the Finnish laskiainen), in Latvian as vēja kūkas, and in Estonian as vastlakukkel.

== Sweden/Finland/Estonia ==
Today, the Swedish-Finnish semla consists of a cardamom-spiced wheat bun which has its top cut off, and is then filled with a mix of milk and almond paste, topped with whipped cream. The cut-off top serves as a lid and is dusted with powdered sugar. Today it is often eaten on its own, with coffee or tea. Some prefer to eat it in a bowl of hot milk.

In Finland, the bun is often filled with strawberry or raspberry jam instead of almond paste, and bakeries in Finland usually offer both versions. (Many bakeries distinguish between the two by decorating the traditional bun with almonds on top, whereas the jam-filled version has powdered sugar on top). Opinions on which of the two is the "correct" filling are divided, and it is a common topic of contention (similar to e.g. the matter of pineapple on pizza, i.e. usually not taken too seriously). In Finland-Swedish, semla means a plain wheat bun, used for bread and butter, and not a sweet bun.

As a result of the Protestant Reformation with a decline in strict observances of Lent, Swedes began to add cream and almond paste to the mix and started eating semla every Tuesday between Shrove Tuesday and Easter. Every year, at around the same time that the Swedish bakeries fill with semlor, local newspapers start to fill with semla taste tests. Panels of 'experts' dissect and inspect tables full of semlor to find the best in town.

Some bakeries have created alternative forms of the pastry, such as the "semmelwrap" formed as a wrap rather than the traditional bun, while others have added e.g. chocolate, marzipan, or pistachios to the recipe.

In Finland and Estonia the traditional dessert predates Christian influences. Laskiaissunnuntai and laskiaistiistai, both days included in laskiainen, were festivals when children and youth would go sledding or downhill sliding on a hill or a slope to determine how the crop would yield in the coming year. Those who slid the farthest were going to get the best crop. Hence the festival is named after the act of sliding or sledding downhill, laskea. Nowadays laskiainen has been integrated into Christian customs as the beginning of lent before Easter.

In Estonia, vastlakukkel is often a cardamom-spiced wheat bun with whipped cream only or with jam or marzipan filling added. Similarly to Finland, vastlad or vastlapäev (Shrove Tuesday) involves sledding. Estonians believed that the one with the longest slide would have the best flax crop yield – specifically the longer the crop, the longer fiber which would mean a higher quality linen textile could be produced.

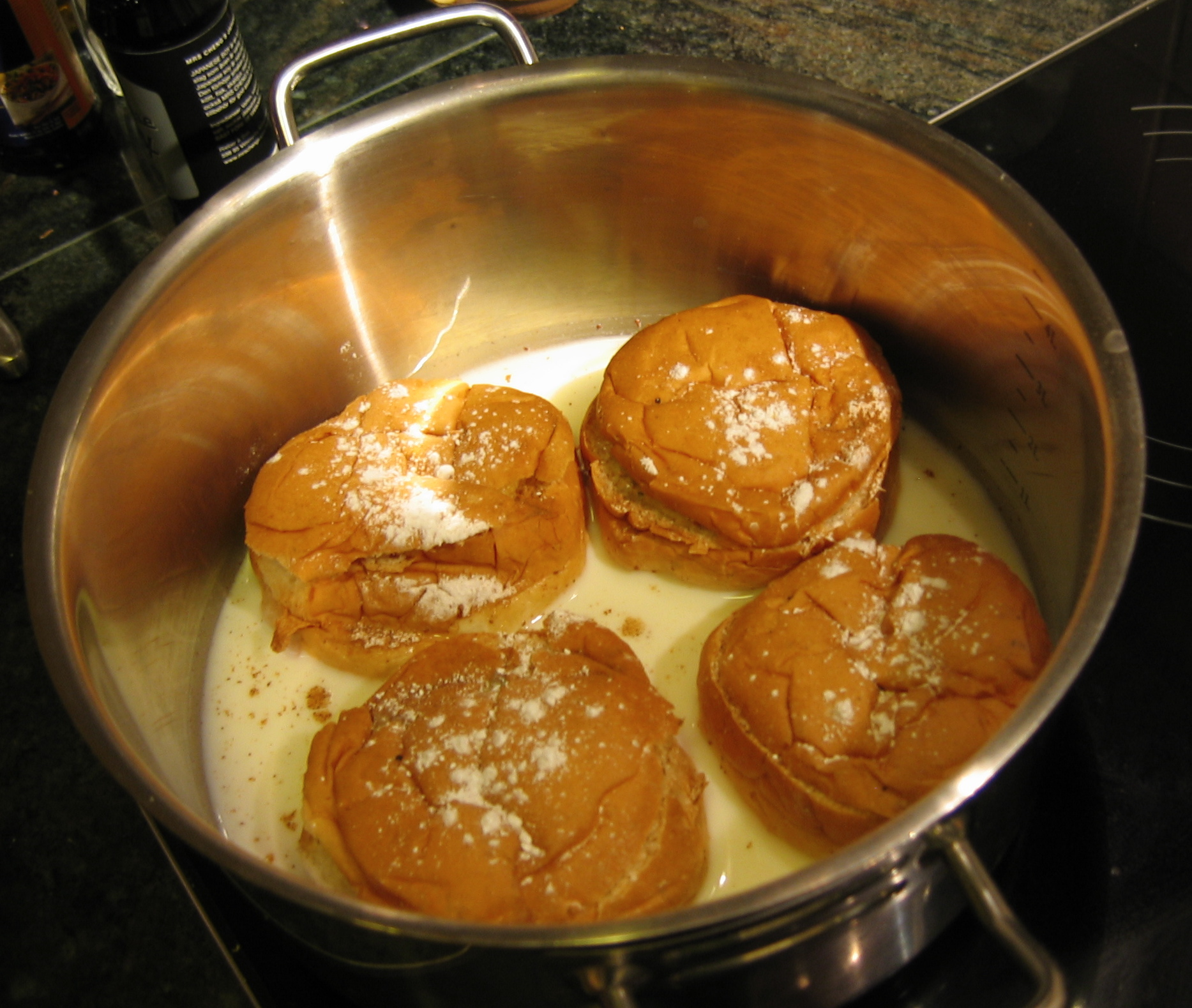
Semla served in warm milk (hetväg)

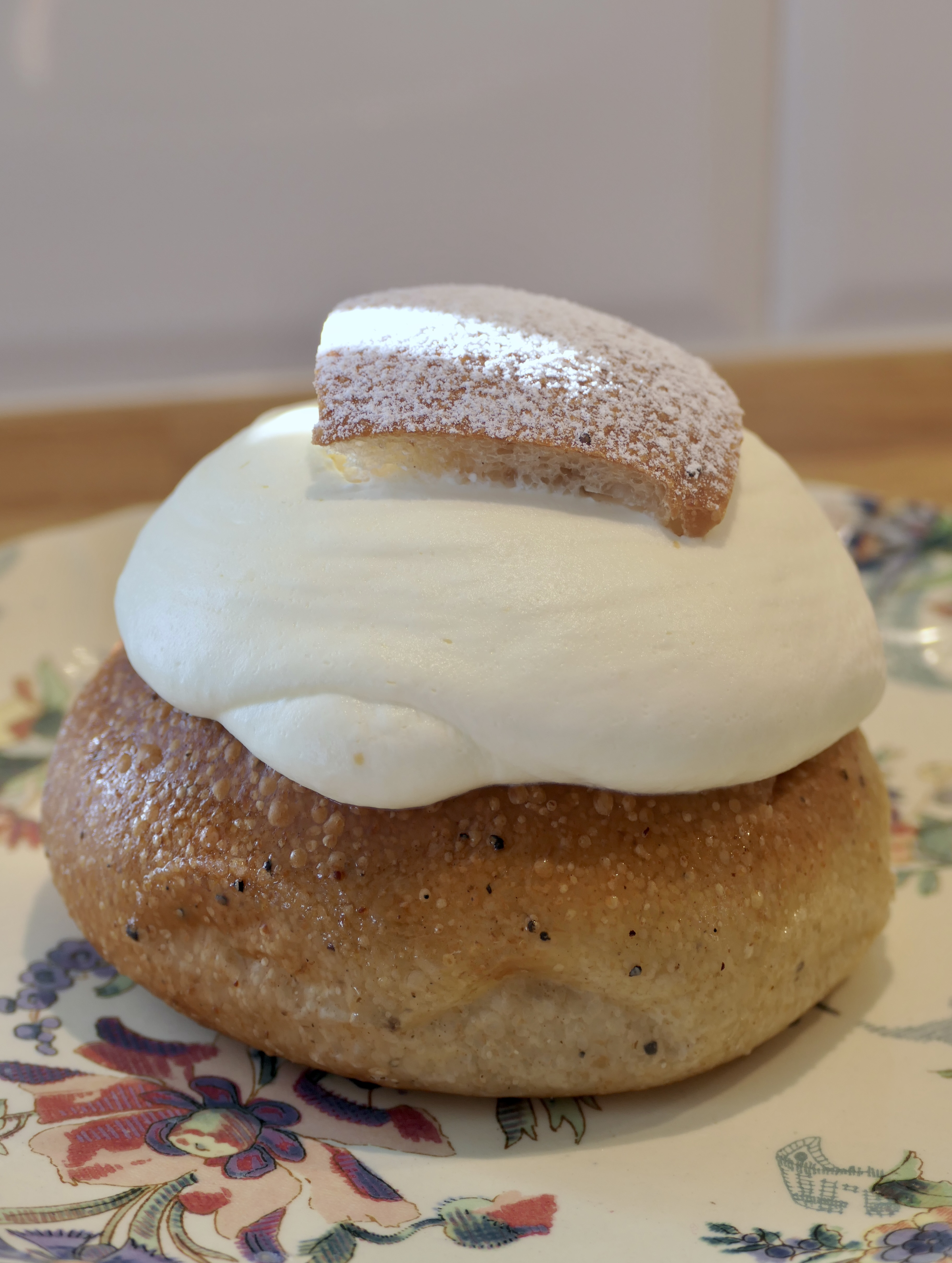
A classic Swedish semla, with a cardamom bun, a small piece of which is cut off and used as a lid.

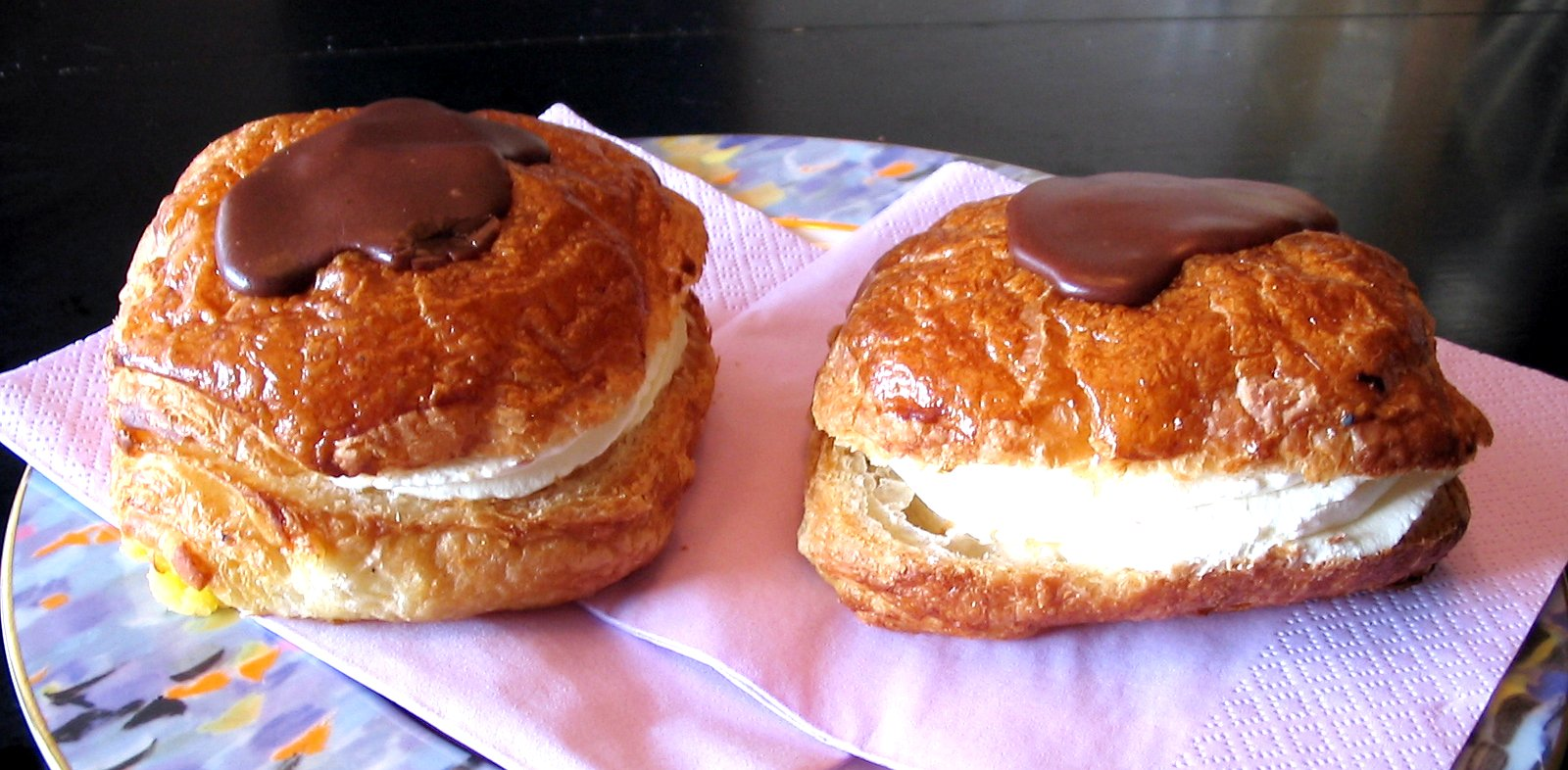
Two Danish fastelavnsboller

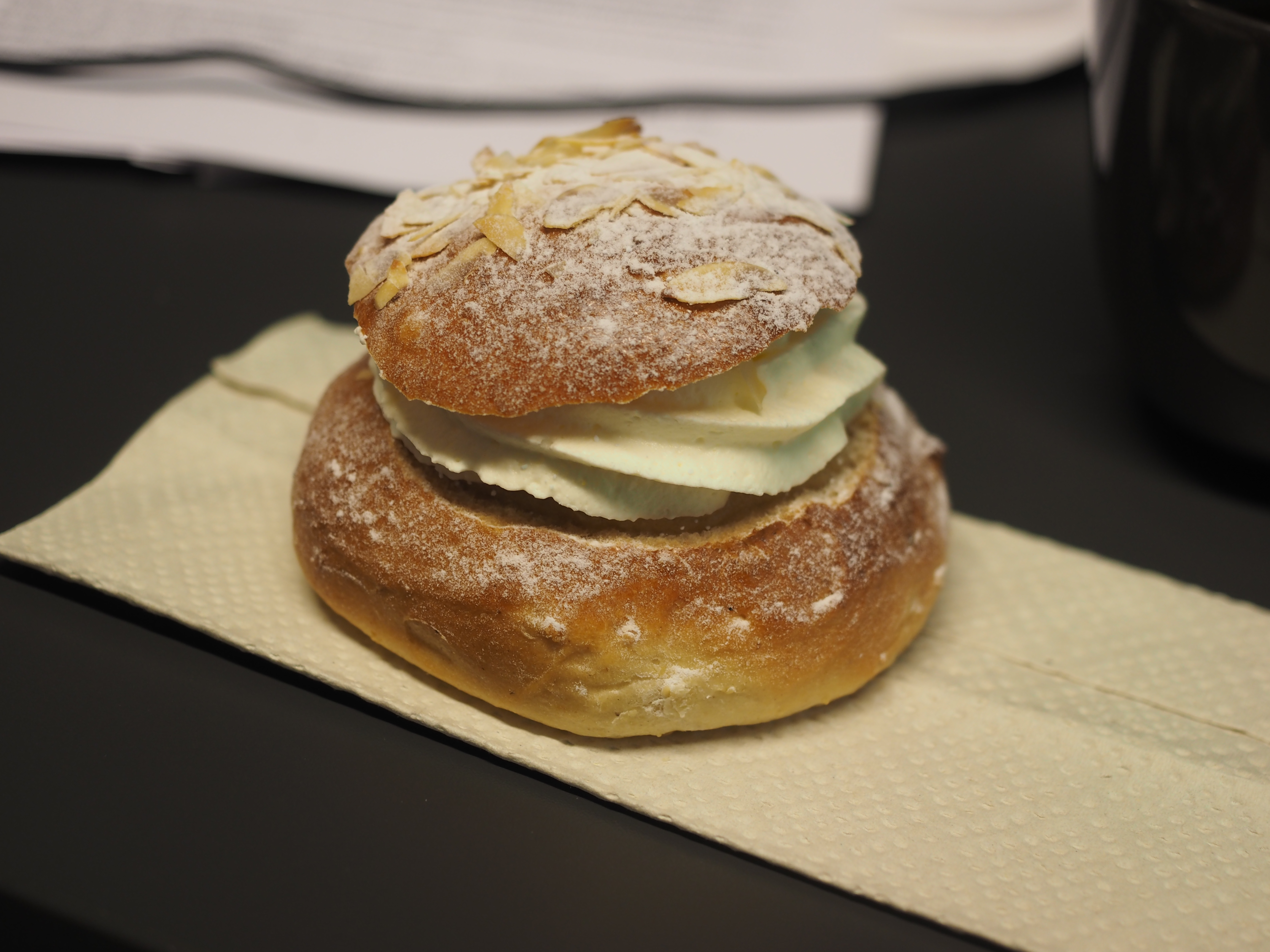
A Finnish laskiaispulla

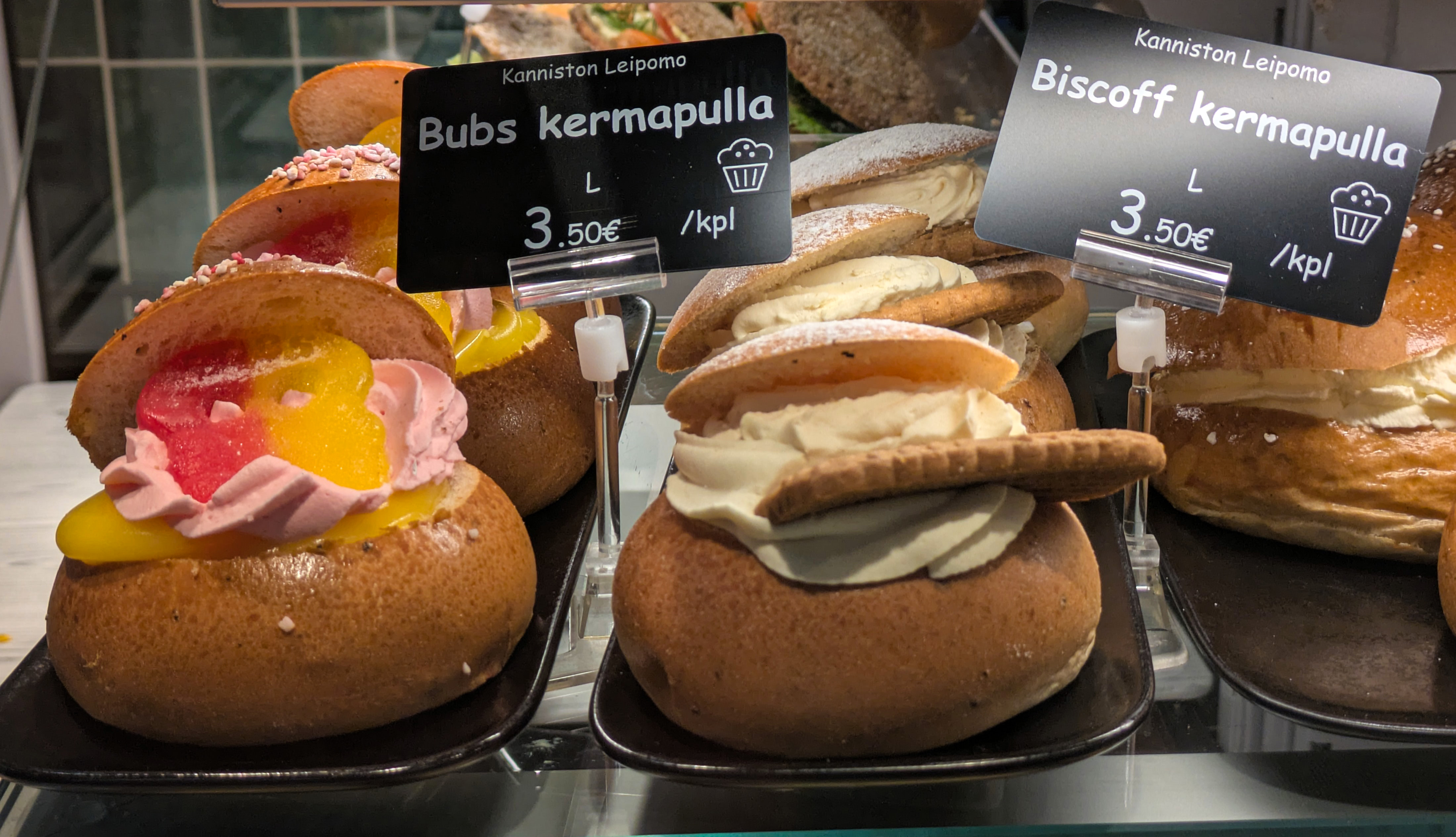
Bubs Godis and Lotus Biscoff flavored laskiaispulla

== Norway ==
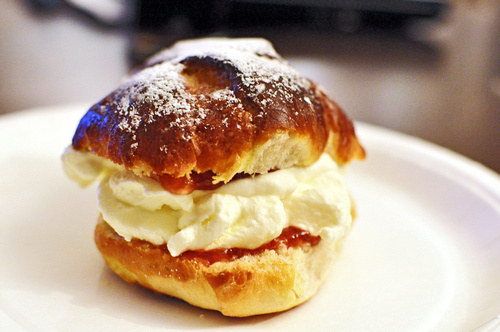
Norwegian fastelavnsbolle with whipped cream, jam and powdered sugar

Fastelavnsbolle consists of a cardamom-spiced wheat bun which has its top cut off, and is then filled with whipped cream, topped with jam. The cut-off top serves as a lid and is dusted with powdered sugar. The buns are served at Sunday of Fastelavn (Shrove Sunday), but were previously associated with Shrove Tuesday.

== Denmark/Iceland/Faroe Islands ==
The version sold in Danish bakeries on or around Shrove Monday is rather different, made from puff pastry and filled with whipped cream, a bit of jam and often with icing on top. At home people may bake a version more similar to a usual wheat roll, mixing plain yeast dough with raisins, succade and sometimes candied bitter orange peel.

In Iceland it is done in a similar way but in place of puff pastry more common is the choux pastry version.

In Icelandic, Shrove Monday is called bolludagur (bun day), named after the pastry.

In the Faroe Islands, the local form of semla are made of choux pastry rather than wheat bread, and filled with vanilla cream, whipped cream and jam, and topped with chocolate icing; they therefore more closely resemble an éclair or profiterole.

== History ==
The oldest version of the semla was a plain bread bun, eaten in a bowl of warm milk. In Swedish this is known as hetvägg, from Middle Low German hete Weggen ('hot wedges') or German heisse Wecken ('hot buns') and falsely interpreted as "hotwall".

The semla was originally eaten only on Shrove Tuesday, or all of the three days before Lent, as the last festive food before Lent. However, with the arrival of the Protestant Reformation, the Swedes stopped observing a strict fast for Lent. The semla in its bowl of warm milk became a traditional dessert every Tuesday between Shrove Tuesday and Easter. Today, semlor are available in shops and bakeries every day from shortly after Christmas until Easter. Each Swede consumes on average four to five bakery-produced semlor each year, in addition to any that are homemade.

According to a popular myth, King Adolf Frederick of Sweden died of digestion problems on February 12, 1771, after consuming a hetvägg (semla), the king's favorite dessert, after a meal consisting of sauerkraut, turnips, caviar, smoked herring, and champagne. In recent versions of the legend, the semla has turned into 14, and sometimes into cinnamon buns.

This was the sweet chosen to represent Finland in the Café Europe initiative of the Austrian presidency of the European Union, on Europe Day 2006.

== See also ==
- Adolf Frederick, King of Sweden
- Cream bun
- Estonian cuisine
- Finnish cuisine
- List of buns
- List of pastries
- Swedish cuisine
