= Bolludagur =

Holiday in Iceland associated with Fastelavn

Bolludagur, or "Cream Bun Day", is a holiday in Iceland associated with Fastelavn, the carnival tradition before Lent celebrated in Scandinavian countries. Bolludagur is celebrated on Shrove Monday; the following days are sprengidagur (on Shrove Tuesday), and öskudagur (Ash Wednesday).

The holiday derives from the Lutheran countries, particularly Denmark and Norway, and was brought to Iceland in the 19th century. It took a specifically Icelandic form in the middle of the 20th century, with children decorating a stick with colored paper and spanking their parents with it while demanding buns ("bolla, bolla, bolla!"). In return, the parents give the children cream buns. The Encyclopedia of Easter Celebrations Worldwide suggests that the tradition may be based on a Catholic liturgical element of the service at the beginning of Lent, when the priest would use a wand to sprinkle holy water on the congregation.

The buns are sweet cream buns; the filling is cream and jam. The buns are topped with chocolate.
