= Fastelavn =

Carnival tradition in Northern Europe

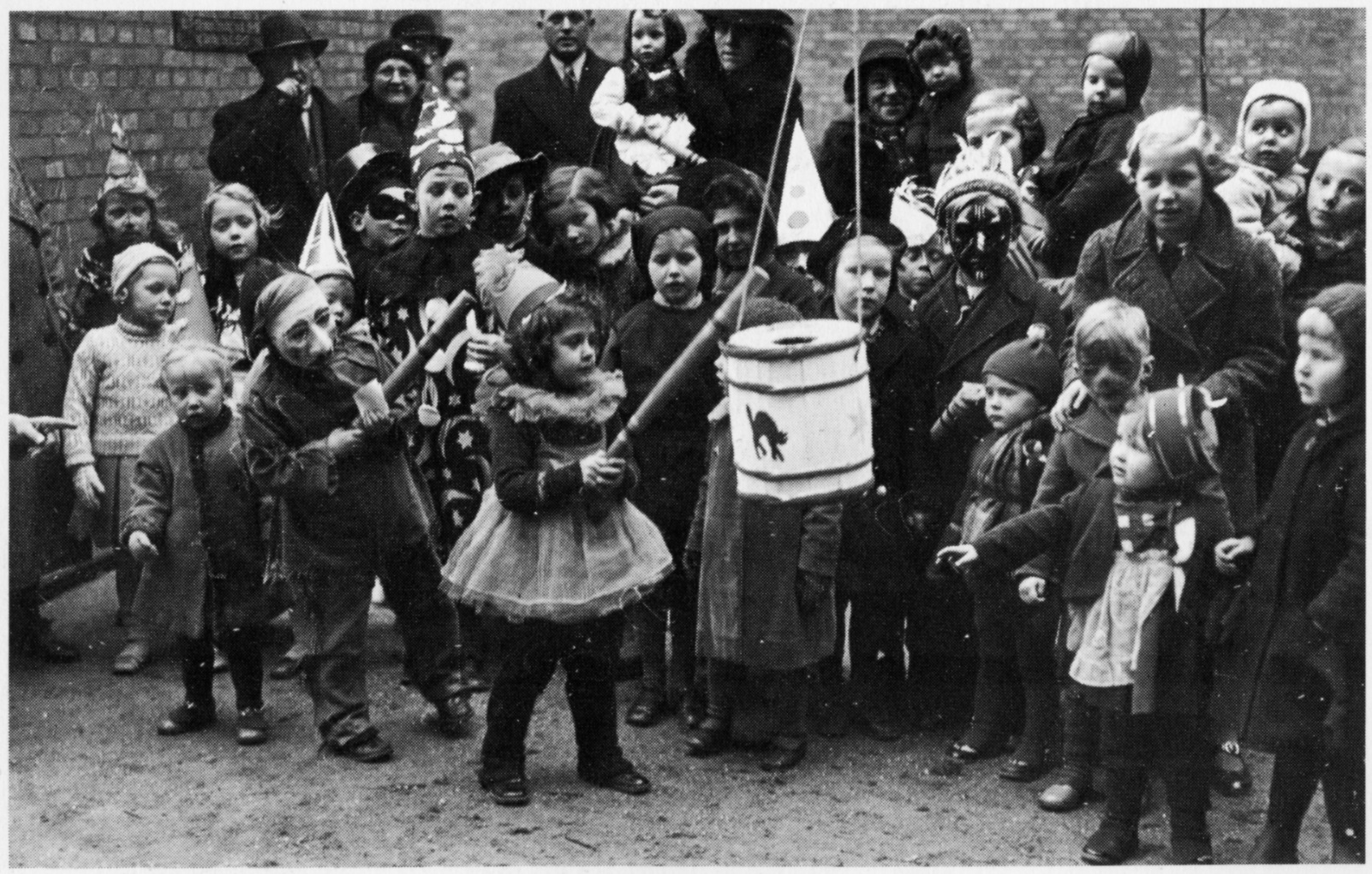
Dressed up children engaged in "slå katten af tønden" (Denmark 1937).

Fastelavn is a Carnival tradition in the Northern European, and historically Lutheran, nations of Denmark, Norway, Sweden, Latvia, Estonia, Iceland, Faroe Islands, as well as Greenland.

The traditions of Fastelavn vary somewhat by country and by local region, as some traditions have changed over time. A common theme of Fastelavn in all the countries currently involves children dressing up in costumes, walking door to door while they sing and gathering treats for the Fastelavn feast, a form of trick-or-treating. Today, the festivities of Fastelavn are generally considered to be a time for children’s fun and family games.

Fastelavn is celebrated seven weeks before Easter Sunday and therefore always falls on a Sunday between February 1 and March 7.

== Etymology and origins ==
The term Fastelavn comes from Old Danish fastelaghen, which was a borrowing of the Middle Low German vastel-avent, meaning "fast-evening", or the day before Lent. The word has cognates in other mostly Germanic languages and languages with contact with it, including Kölsch Fastelovend, Limburgish Vastelaovend, Dutch Vastenavond, Scots Fastens-een, Latvian Vastlāvji, and Estonian Vastlapäev.

The related word Fastelovend is used for Carnival in Germany in Cologne and Bonn with the same meaning. Fastelavn is related to the Roman Catholic tradition of Carnival in the days before Lent, although after Denmark became a Protestant nation the festival adopted certain distinctive characteristics. The holiday occurs the week before the Christian penitential season of Lent, culminating on Shrove Tuesday, the day before Ash Wednesday, the first day of Lent. The Swedish counterpart is Fastlagen, the Icelandic is Sprengidagur, and in Finland they celebrate Laskiainen. In Estonia it is celebrated as Vastlapäev. In Iceland, Ísafjörður is the only town that celebrates Fastelavn on the same day as the other Nordic countries, on Monday, locally known as Maskadagur (mask-day).

== Festivities ==
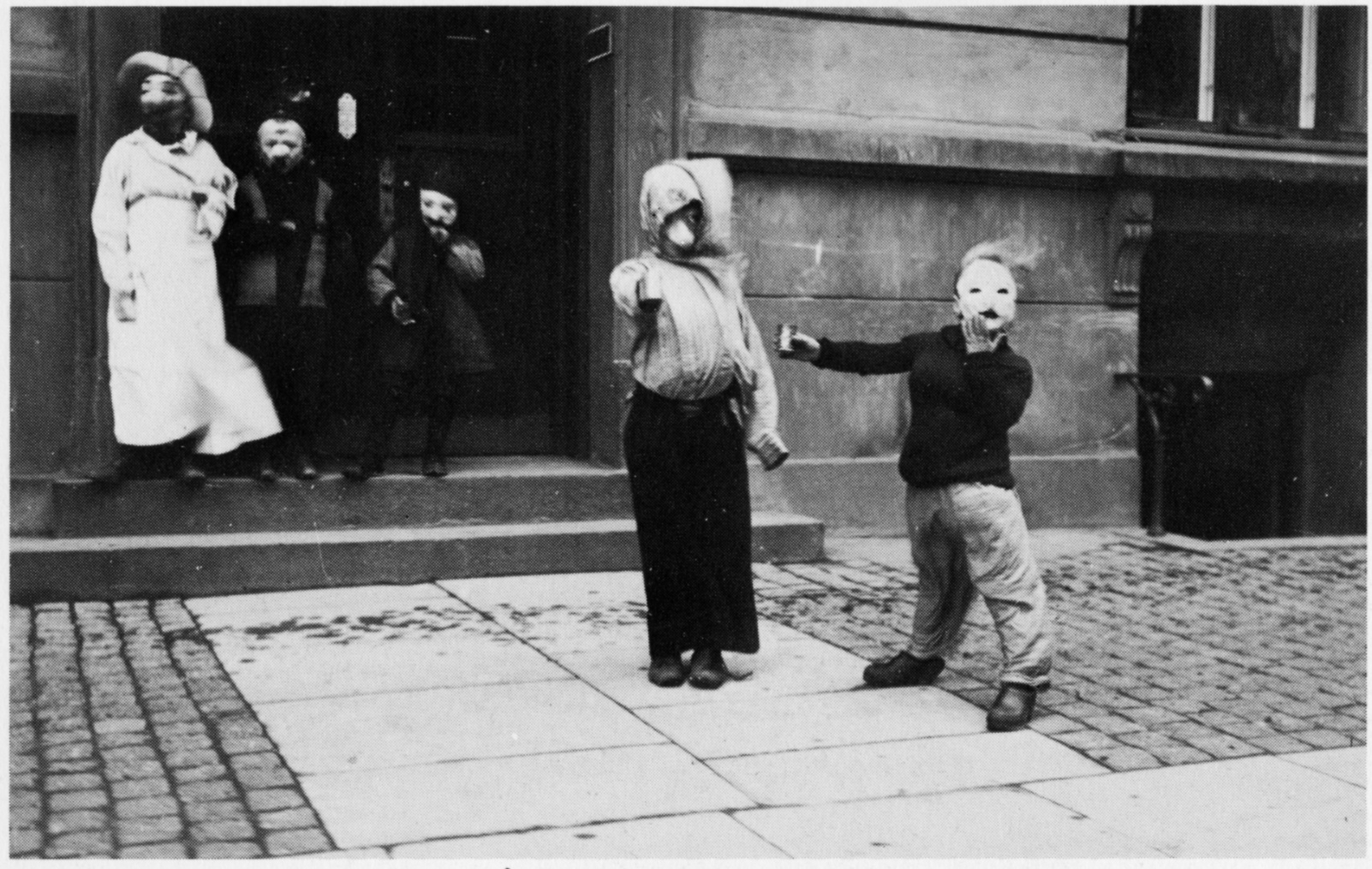
Costumed children walking door to door. Denmark 1930s.

As in Carnival traditions elsewhere, dressing up in costumes forms an important part of Fastelavn in all the Nordic Lutheran countries where this festivity is celebrated. In some places this involves smaller processions, but in contrast to former times, dressing up in costumes are now mainly a children's activity only.

In Norway, students having seen celebrations in Paris introduced Carnival processions, masked balls and Carnival balls to Christiana in the 1840s and 1850s. From 1863, the artist federation kunstnerforeningen held annual Carnival balls in the old freemasons lodge, which inspired Johan Svendsen's compositions "Norsk Kunstnerkarneval" and "Karneval in Paris". The following year, Svendsens Festpolonaise was written for the opening procession of the Carnival ball. Edvard Grieg also attended the Carnival, and wrote "aus dem Karneval" (folkelivsbilleder Op. 19). After the Rococo Hall at Grand Hotel opened in 1894, annual balls in the Carnival season were arranged until the hall was destroyed in a fire in 1957. Since 1988, the student organization Tårnseilerne have produced annual masquerade balls in Oslo in the historical renovated freemasons lodge in the Carnival tradition, with masks, costumes and processions after attending an opera performance. The Carnival season also includes Fastelavens søndag (with cream buns) and fastelavensris with decorated branches.

=== Cat in a barrel ===
Traditional events include slå katten af tønden ("hit the cat out of the barrel"), which is somewhat similar to using a piñata. It occurs following the church service of Shrove Sunday in parishes of the Evangelical Lutheran Church in Denmark and, also, at non-religious celebrations in city squares etc. This tradition is also celebrated in Scania (Skåne) in southern Sweden, a formerly Danish area. To play this game, a wooden barrel full of candy is strung up in a suitable location and then the game is on: the participants each get a go to strike the barrel with a club or stick. There are sometimes oranges too inside the barrel and it has the image of a cat painted on it. After the candy pours out, the game continues until the entire barrel has been smashed to pieces. The one who knocks down the bottom of the barrel (making all the candy spill out) becomes kattedronning ("queen of cats"); the one who knocks down the last piece of the barrel becomes kattekonge ("king of cats"). In some places, the person behind the kattekonge becomes kattedronning, although this is not common. The same tradition is held in the Faroe Islands but the barrel is most commonly empty. The person to finally knock down the last piece of the barrel becomes kattakongur ("king of cats").

In Denmark and Scania, the barrel tradition has been practised for centuries, possibly introduced by Dutch immigrants to Copenhagen during the reign of Christian II of Denmark in the early 1500s. Historically, there was a real cat in the barrel, and beating the barrel and chasing the cat symbolised demolishing evil and chasing it away. It was practised up until the 1800s, with the last known event occurring in the 1880s. The cat was not killed, but allowed to escape when the barrel was broken. The practise also used to be popular in Holland and similar events were known from Germany, called "Katzenschlagen". The Danish tradition is still celebrated today, but candy is used instead of a cat.

=== Songs ===
A popular children's song in Denmark is:

Original Danish

Fastelavn er mit navn,
boller vil jeg have.
Hvis jeg ingen boller får,
så laver jeg ballade.
Boller op, boller ned
boller i min mave.
Hvis jeg ingen boller får,
så laver jeg ballade.

English translation:

Shrovetide is my name,
buns I want.
If I get no buns,
then I make trouble.
Buns up, buns down
buns in my tummy.
If I get no buns,
then I make trouble.

Fastelavn song

The song is sung on various occasions related to Fastelavn, but mostly by costumed children, walking door to door, as a form of trick-or-treat. Even though the song relates to Fastelavnsboller, candy or money is usually offered to the kids when they sing.

=== Cakes ===
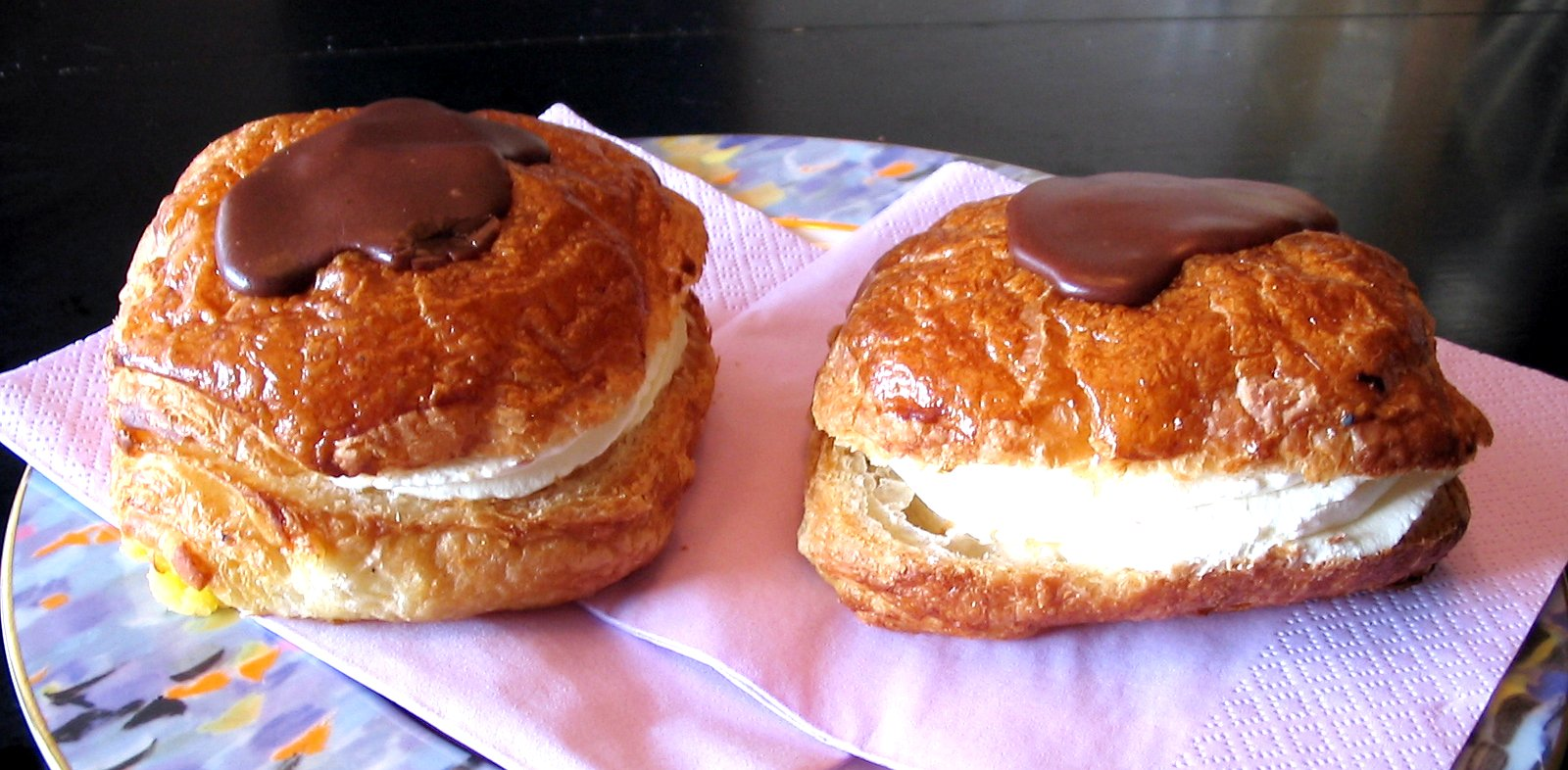
Danish fastelavnsboller

In Denmark, Iceland, Sweden and Norway a popular baked good associated with Fastelavn is the semla or fastelavnsbolle (lit. "Fastelavn bun", also known in English as "Shrovetide bun" or "Lenten bun"), a round sweet bun of various sorts usually covered with icing and sometimes filled with a whipped cream mix or pastry cream. In most bakeries they are up for sale throughout the whole month of February. In Swedish they are called "semlor", "fastlagsbullar" or (in southern dialect) "fastelansbollar".

Similar buns are eaten in other Northern European countries.

There seem to be some small local traditions which are closer to the carnival traditions of other countries, including Ash Wednesday, Carnival parades, Pancake Tuesday and eating special food after Ash Wednesday, but they are not particular to Danish culture.

=== Shrovetide rods ===
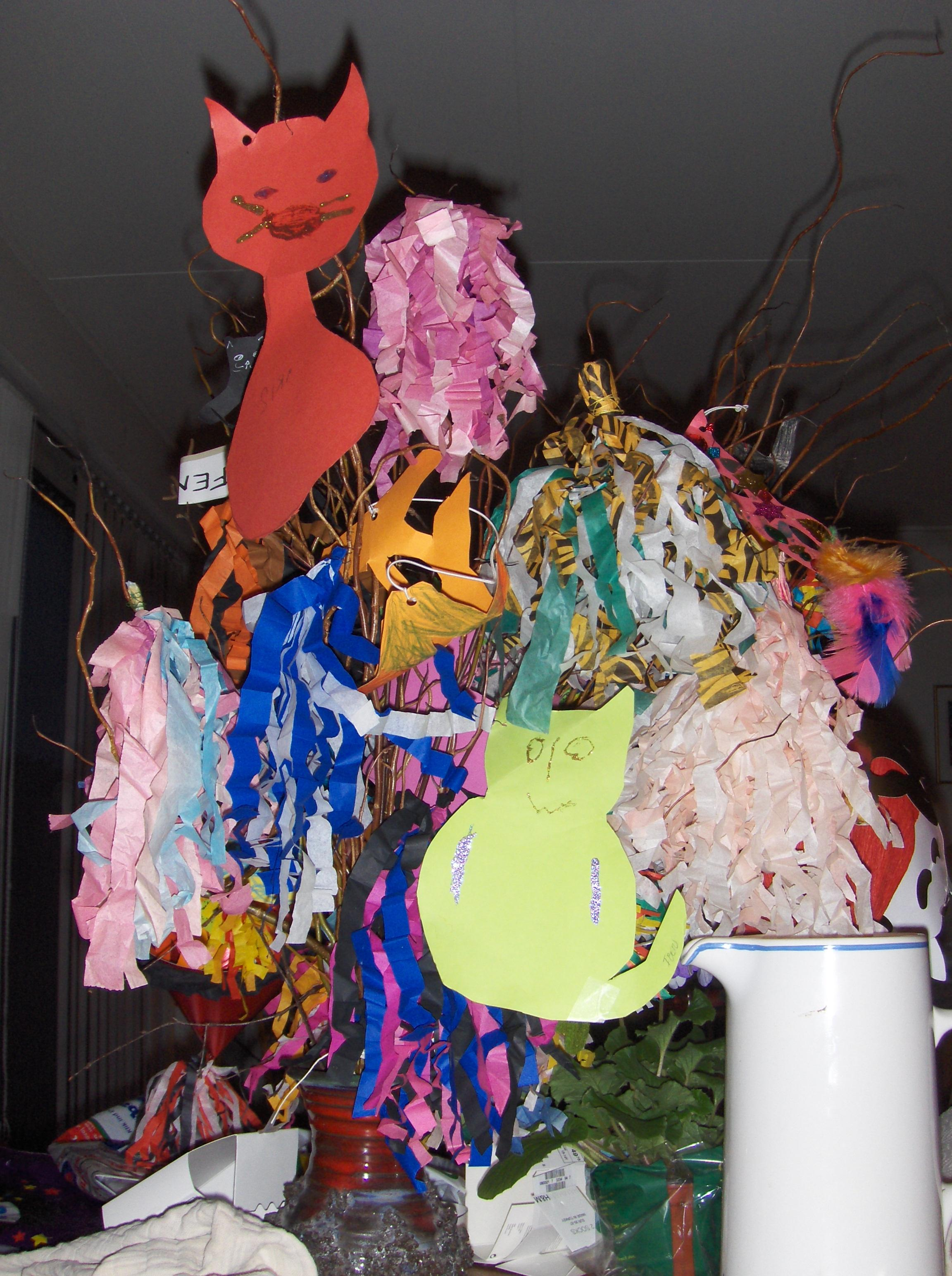
Fastelavnsris

Another popular custom (especially among the children) is the Shrovetide Rod (fastelavnsris), with which children ritually flog their parents to wake them up on the morning of Fastelavns Sunday (Quinquagesima).

Fastelavnsris ("fastlagsris" in Swedish) have many shapes and forms and differ from area to area. In some areas they are bunches of twigs, usually from fruit trees and preferably with buds. Those are often decorated with feathers, egg-shells, storks and little figures of babies. In other areas, they are a bent willow-branch, shaped like an ankh and wound with crepe paper that has frizzles cut with scissors. Both varieties may be decorated with candy as well.

The custom was known in 18th century in Germany and it has several roots. It may originate from an old pagan fertility ritual, which has been absorbed into Christianity. The more serious one is that after the reformation, particularly pious people used to lightly flog their children on Good Friday to remind them of the sufferings of Christ on the cross. A similar custom is mentioned in the book "Frauenzimmerlexicon", published in 1715 in Leipzig (Germany), which describes how bachelors and virgins "bid each other goodmorning" by flogging each other and spreading ashes on each other. This custom is also known in both Denmark and Norway.

Earlier, it was mainly the young women and the infertile who were flogged. It was also common that a young man would carry his "fastelavnsris" and gently strike at young women he met on the street. Later it became the children's special right to flog their parents on this day. In any case, the reward given for the flogging would be a fastelavnsbolle.

=== Church services ===
During Shrovetide, faithful Christians attend Mass; on Quinquagesima Sunday, a special family service is held in parishes of the Evangelical Lutheran Church in Denmark in which children dress up in costume. The children's sermon focuses on "appearances and what it means to hide behind a mask or be in disguise." After the church service concludes, congregants enjoy Shrovetide buns (fastelavnsboller) while children celebrate the custom of knocking the barrel (which symbolizes battling evil) and then consuming the sweets and fruit within it.

=== Processions ===
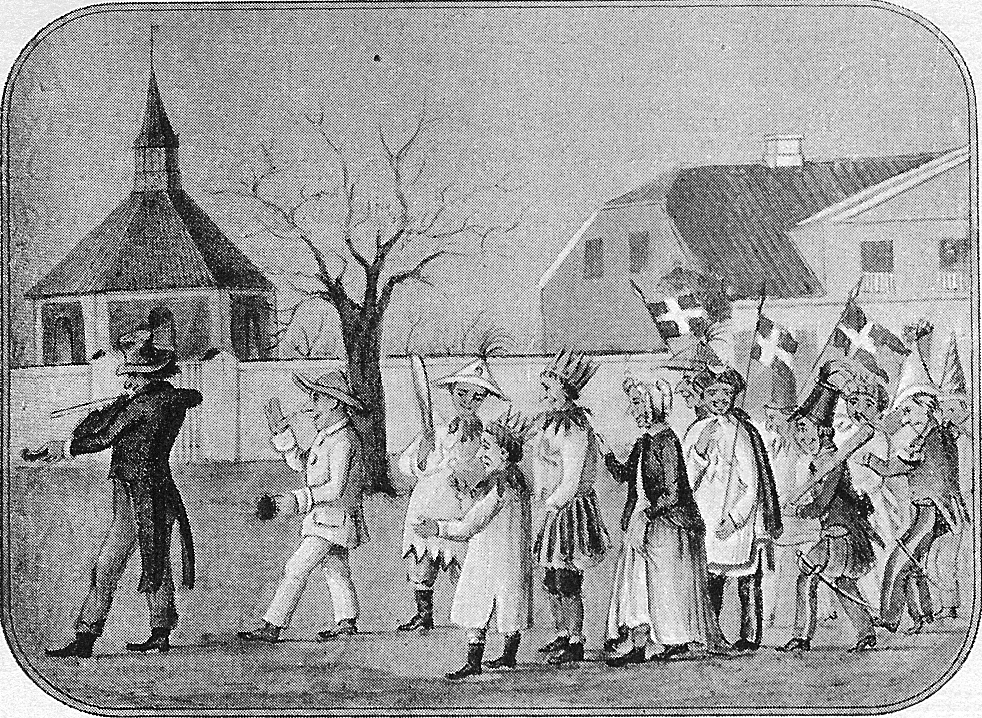
A Fastelavn procession (Denmark, mid 1800s).

Fastelavn processions are not practised on any notable scale anymore, but used to form an important part of the festivities for centuries in Denmark. Unmarried adults dressed up in costumes and visited houses of their choice across town. Here they teased, danced and gathered food and money for the Fastelavn celebration. If married people and the elderly wanted to take part in the festivities, they could put on costumes and visit friends to tease and have fun. These costume games were not liked by Danish authorities, and were outlawed by them in 1683; Brorson even wrote a song about abolishing what he saw as problematic customs. However, the costume games were popular among the common people and they continued to be practised nonetheless. Today, groups of costumed children walk from door to door to sing and collect candy and small-change money. On Shrove Sunday, parishes of the Evangelical Lutheran Church in Denmark hold special family services in which children dress up in costume.

In Denmark, special boat processions were practised in coastal communities from at least the early 1700s and consisted of a regular wooden boat with wheels pushed through the streets accompanied by shouts and music. The boat was decorated, sometimes with mythological figures, and when it stopped on its route through town, onlookers were expected to feed a collection box for charity. The last boat processions died out in the 1970s.

== See also ==
- Carnival
- Shrovetide
- Public holidays in Denmark
- Shrove Tuesday
- Laskiainen
