= Leicester's Whipping Toms =

The 'Whipping Toms' event in Leicester was an annual tradition celebrated in the Newarke area of Leicester on Shrove Tuesday. Until 1846, a group of men would stand and whip men and boys in the vicinity of the Newarke area as part of an annual game. A plaque in the area marks the point where the 'Toms' would stand. The custom is believed to have been a commemoration of the chasing of the Danes out of the city in the 10th century. The tradition was banned whilst Robert Peel was Prime Minister in Parliament through the Leicester Improvement Act in 1846.

== Historical background ==
The first occurrence of the event is unknown, with the earliest recorded mention in 1744. The custom is believed to precede this date. The tradition was believed by some to be the commemoration of the expulsion of the Danes from Leicester in the 10th century. Other suggestions to its background allude to other pagan practices with the pain akin to a form of sacrifice. This suggestion also comes from the timing of the event - it coincided with traditional signs of Spring, an important season in pagan traditions. It has also been seen as a potential form of penitence in preparation for the Christian season of Lent, a theme of which is penance. Lent would begin on Ash Wednesday, the day which followed the 'Whipping Tom' event.

== Practices ==
The day began with a fair in the Newarke area, with music and entertainment, as well as food. The area was described as having a festive mood, and would have been a great source of entertainment for the people of Leicester, with people gathering from across Leicester in the area to celebrate. A hockey-like game was played, with the gates to the Newarke area acting as goals. The hockey game would come to a conclusion shortly after midday, with most women and young children vacating the area at this time. The remaining men and boys would have been those participating in that year's event.

The 'whipping' portion of the day began at around 1:00 PM. At this time, three men would emerge wearing blue clothes, one carrying a bell, and the others carrying a 'large waggon whip' each. The aim of the remaining men and teenage boys in the area would be to try and capture the bell, or at least stop it from being rung, whilst the men clad in blue would try to defend themselves and the bell using their whips. The game would only conclude when the bell was seized and the ringing stopped. This could take as long as several hours.

The whippings were limited to below the knees, and the 'Toms' could not whip anyone who was kneeling. Kneeling was a sign of submission to the 'Toms', and anyone who knelt would not receive a whipping. There was also an option to make a two pence donation instead of being whipped. However, it is believed that this was not always adhered to, depending on the 'Toms' participating that year, with the donation sometimes not acting as the barrier to a whipping that it should. This was introduced as a way to allow people to access the Newarke area who had a need to, without them necessarily taking part in the whippings.

== Abolition ==
Whilst a number of pitiful safeguards were put in place, such as limits on where on the body people could be whipped, the event was seen as a brutal celebration, resulting in its abolition by an Act of Parliament 1846. The bill, titled the Leicester Improvement Act, was passed on 16 February 1846 to put an end to the practice, but this was met with some fierce opposition from the 'Whipping Toms', who saw the Act as an attack on a way of life and the end of a much-loved local custom and tradition. They did not heed the warnings of the Leicester Improvement Act and carried out the custom the following year in 1847. The press reported the presence of upwards of 150 constables and the arrest and transport to Gaol of "two vans full of prisoners", this proved effective as the custom desisted in 1848 and 1849 with the threat of a substantial £5 fine to be paid by anyone who had carried on their position as a 'Whipping Tom', due to the perceived severity of the whippings given by the 'Toms'. The tradition can be seen as dead by 1848.
