= Lundi Gras =

Shrove Monday events during Mardi Gras

Lundi Gras (French for "Fat Monday") is a series of Shrove Monday events which take place in New Orleans during the city's Mardi Gras festivities. It includes the tradition of Rex, king of the New Orleans carnival, and Zulu King arriving by boat. Some of the traditions date back to 1874, but the day was not widely celebrated until 1987, when the arrival of Rex was included in a series of river-related events under the name of "Lundi Gras". Lundi Gras was the creation of journalist Errol Laborde. The event was staged with the cooperation of Riverwalk Marketplace and its then marketing director Carol Thistle Lentz. The events are detailed in Laborde's book, Krewe: The Early New Orleans Carnival from Comus to Zulu.

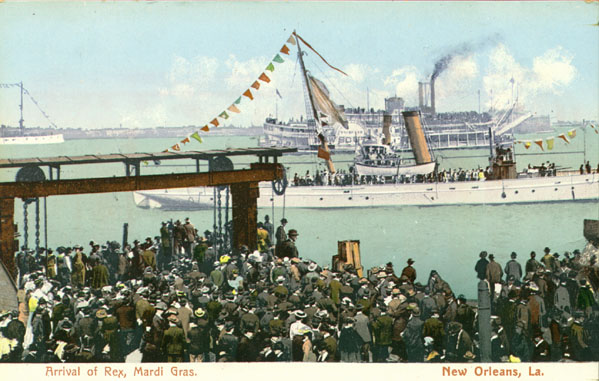
Early 20th-century postcard view of the arrival of Rex

== 19th-century beginnings ==
In 1874, 18 years after the beginning of modern Carnival celebrations in New Orleans, Rex chose to have a grand arrival in New Orleans from the Mississippi River. Once on dry land, Rex and his royal court were placed in carriages and driven through the streets to City Hall. Therein, the mayor and various city officials would present King with the keys to the city and proclaim the rule of Rex in this mystical and temporary realm of Carnival. Typically, the proclamation decreed the beginning of Mardi Gras and Rex's reign at sunrise the following morning.

The Rex landing was a success, quickly becoming a treasured part of the Carnival celebrations which was unique to New Orleans, but no other country or parishes observed the Monday before Shrovetide. The landing continued until World War I stopped Carnival in New Orleans. When the parades again returned to the streets some two years later, the landing had fallen by the wayside, a seeming casualty of "the war to end war".

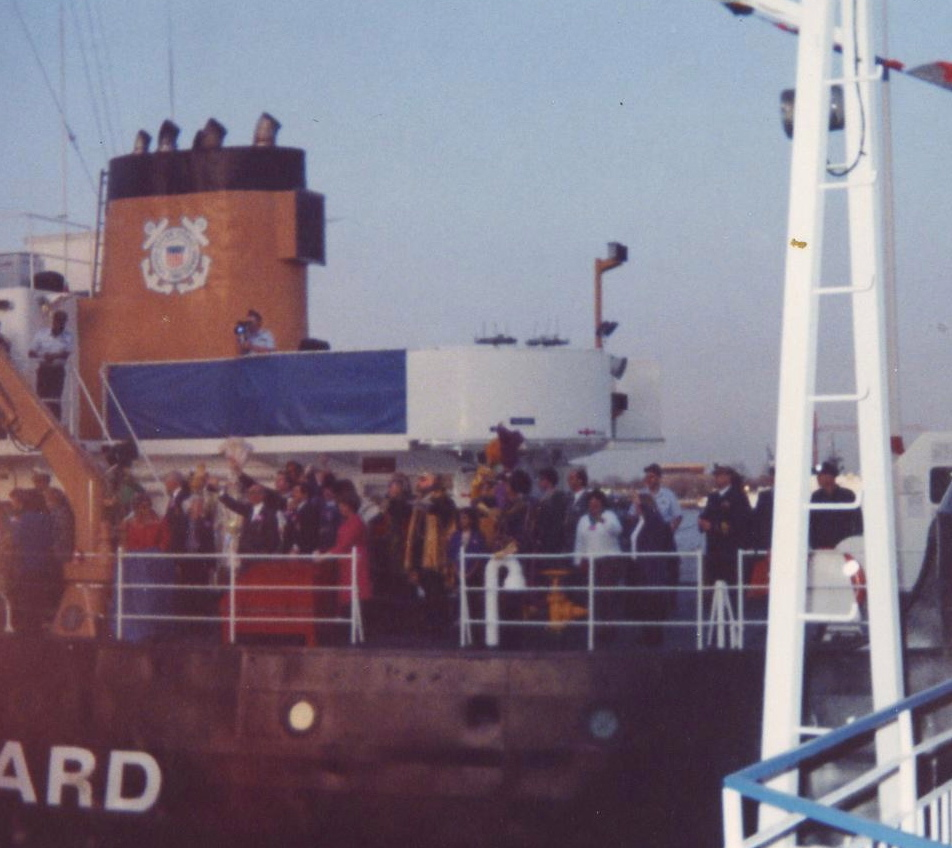
"Rex" on the Coast Guard ship "Sweet Gum" at the Mississippi River front, Lundi Gras night (1993).

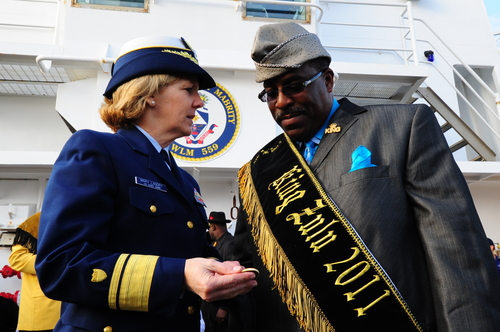
Arrival of King Zulu (2011).

== 20th-century revival ==
In 1971, the landing was recreated as a one-off to celebrate Rex's centennial. In 1987, Rex once again made a grand arrival on the Riverfront at the foot of Canal Street but now with the phrase Lundi Gras attached to the events which would include concerts and fireworks.

The King of the Zulu Social Aid & Pleasure Club also participates in the modern version of the event; the Mayor of New Orleans usually attends as well to salute the two Carnival monarchs and turn over symbolic control of the city for the following day.

While there has been some earlier historic use of the term not confined to New Orleans, the current Lundi Gras, referring to a group of New Orleans riverfront activities, has been a carnival custom only since 1987.

== See also ==
- Carnival
- Clean Monday
- Collop Monday
- Rosenmontag
- Nickanan Night
