= Semmelwrap =

Swedish almond pastry

Semmelwrap is a Swedish pastry.

A semmelwrap is a variation of the Swedish semla, a cardamom-flavoured bun filled with almond paste and whipped cream. The semla is traditionally eaten on Shrove Tuesday. The ingredients of the semmelwrap are similar to those in a standard semla. The key difference between a traditional semla and the semmelwrap is that the dough is rolled thin and baked lightly, so that it can be rolled as a sandwich wrap around the whipped cream and almond paste.

The semmelwrap was invented by Mattias Ljungberg at Tössebageriet, a bakery in Östermalm, Stockholm. It was launched in January 2015 ahead of the semla season. According to Ljungberg the ambition had been to design a semla pastry that one could eat "on the go". The launching of the Semmelwrap quickly became a viral success, with broad coverage in Swedish publishing and social media. By late January 2015 Tössebageriet claimed to be selling around 1,000 Semmelwraps per day.

Neither the name nor the design of the pastry were trademark protected by its creator. Other bakeries across the country soon began imitating the concept. However, the habit of eating semla on Shrove Tuesday is a deep-rooted Swedish tradition and the concept of the semmelwrap was met with scepticism by people preferring traditional semlas.

== Etymology ==
At the time of the launch of the pastry, the correctness of its name began to be debated. Ljungberg himself insists that the name is "semmelwrap" (i.e. a semla-based wrap). However, the Swedish Institute for Language and Folklore commented on the naming, stating that "wrapsemla" (i.e. a semla shaped as a wrap) or "rullsemla" ("rolled semla") would be more adequate namings.

== See also ==
- List of almond dishes
