= Laskiainen =

Finnish celebration

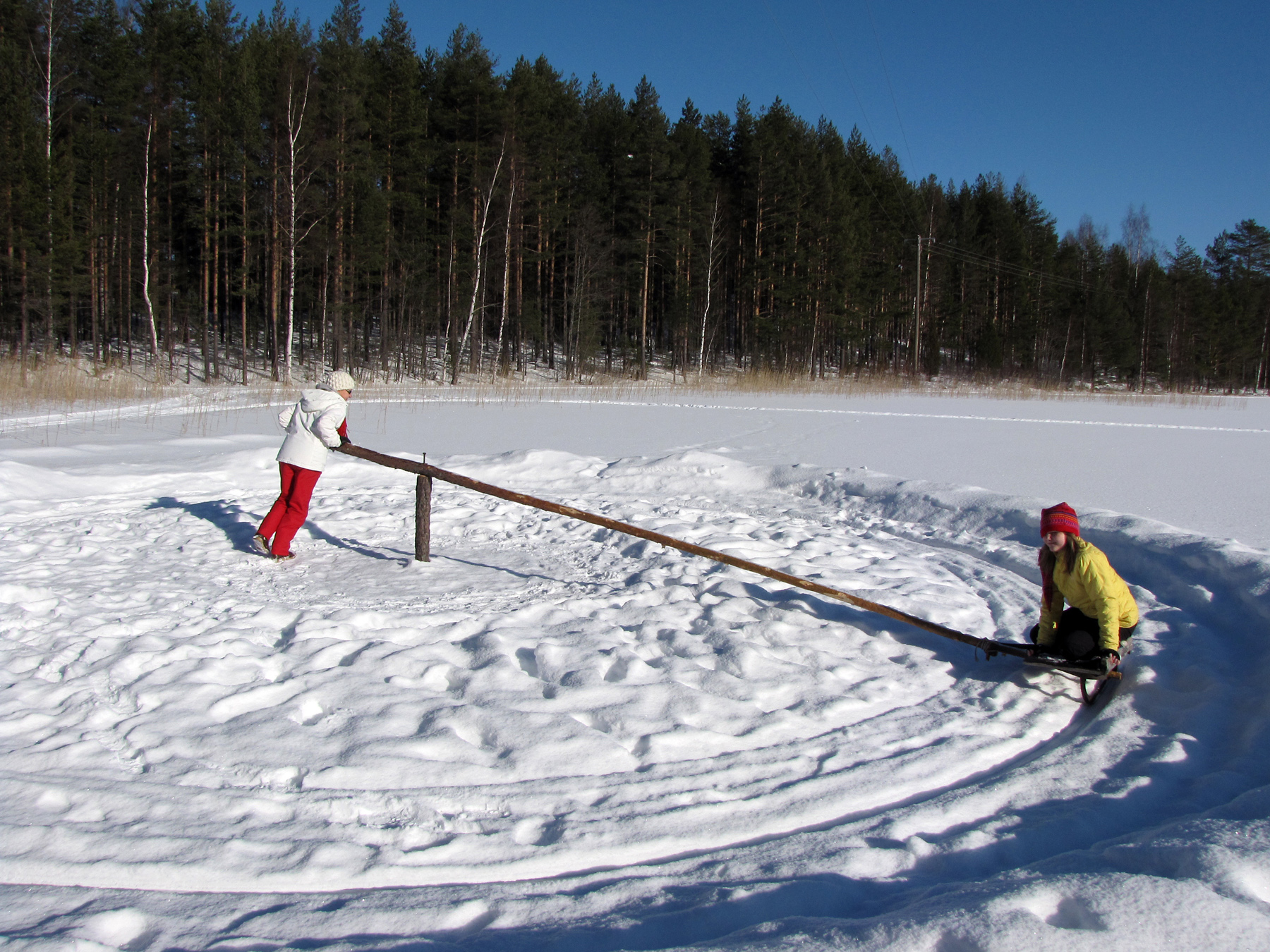
Sled riding on ice is part of Finnish Laskiainen traditions.

Laskiainen (Finnish pronunciation: [ˈlɑskiɑi̯nen]) is the Finnish celebration of what is known in the English-speaking world as Shrove Tuesday. It is often described as a "mid-winter sledding festival".

Ecclesiastically, Laskiainen is a part of Shrovetide and is a Lutheran celebration just prior to the beginning of Lent, the 40-day season of repentance in Christianity. In Northern Europe, this tradition has been practiced from at least the 7th century onward, and in Catholic countries—in the form of carnivals—even before that.

== Laskiainen in Finland ==
=== Etymology ===
The etymology of the word laskiainen is uncertain. Candidates for the source of the word have been laskeutua ('to descend', as in descent to fasting) or laskea ('to count', as in counting days until Easter). According to a third proposal, the word comes from the old Romance term carne lasciare ('to leave meat'), with the latter part having changed into a Finnish form.

As Laskiainen is called fettisdag ('fatty Tuesday') in Swedish after the French name Mardi Gras, one possible explanation for the Finnish name is simply läskitiistai ('fatty Tuesday'). The Finnish word läski comes from the Swedish word fläsk, meaning 'pork, pork fat'. Fläsktisdag is also part of Swedish culinary traditions.

=== Traditions ===
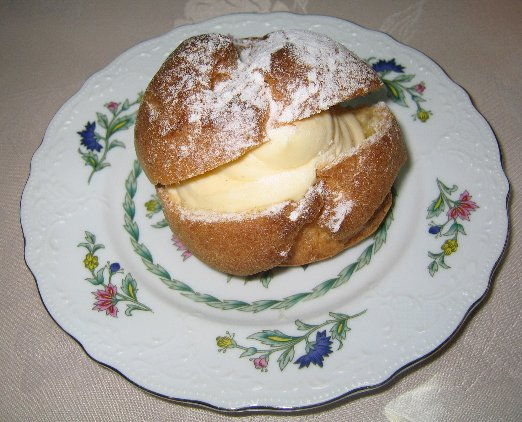
A Finnish cream puff called laskiaispulla, a traditional Laskiainen dessert

The traditions of Laskiainen consist largely of merrymaking and feasts.

Many of the Finnish Laskiainen traditions are probably based on an old work feast, where women stopped the winter tasks of working linen, hemp and wool and spinning them into yarn. Surviving old Laskiainen traditions include downhill sled riding and riding a sled around a pole. Laskiainen is no longer connected with the growth of flax, but is instead a feast of saying goodbye to the dark winter and waiting for spring.

After the Reformation, Finns no longer observed obligatory fasting, but many beliefs and restrictions stayed in the people's minds. Laskiainen remained a peasant work feast, most importantly as a day belonging to women's work. An ancient European New Year's Day is situated around Laskiainen, which has led to many folk beliefs and spells connected to it in historical Finland. Work had to be stopped early in the afternoon on Laskiainen, in order for work to succeed for the rest of the year. The time for sauna was during daylight and bathers had to be quiet in the sauna.

==== Food ====
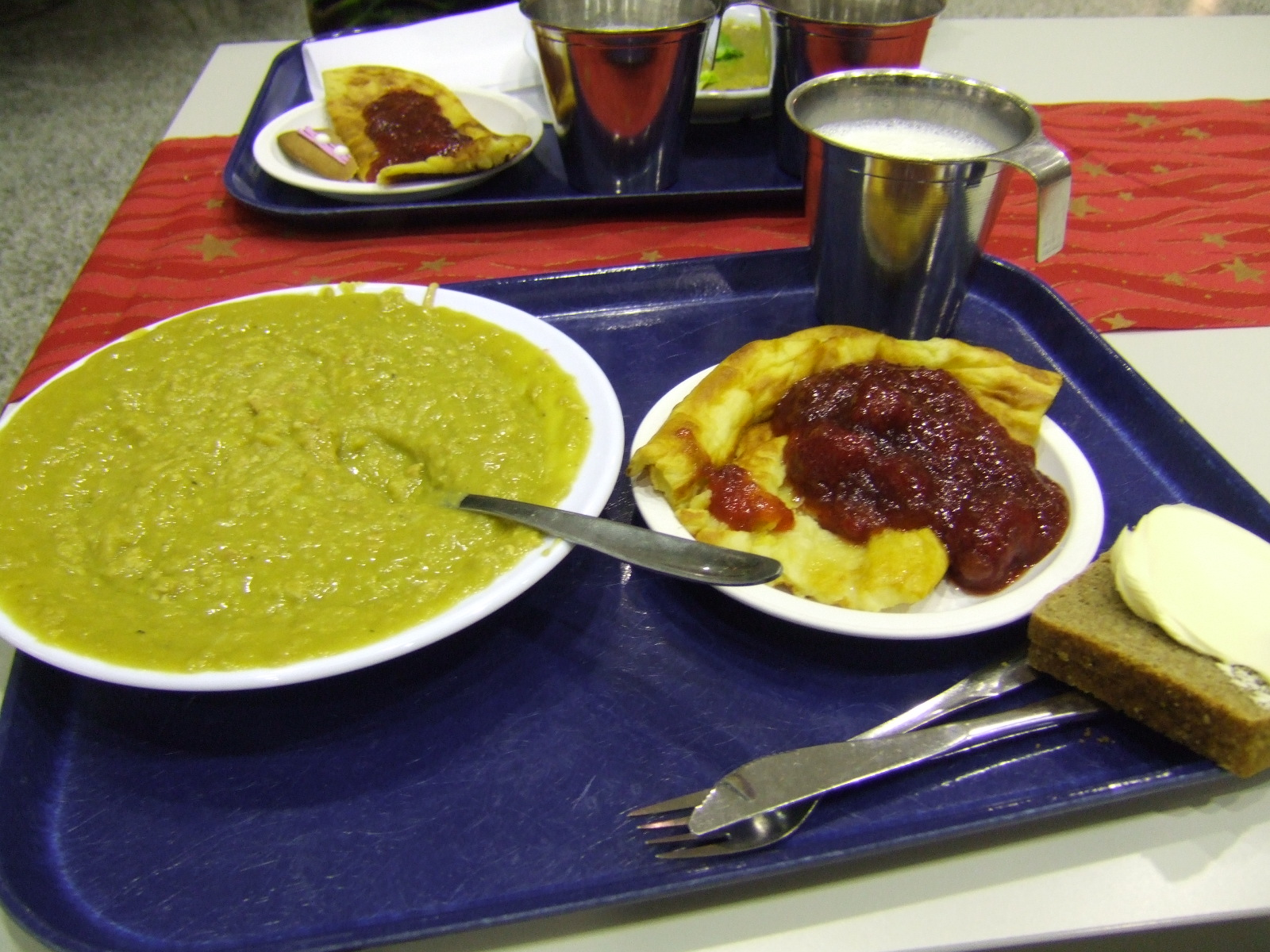
Pea soup and pancakes with jam is a traditional Finnish Laskiainen food.

Food items typically enjoyed in Finland in Laskiainen include in many cases pea soup with ham, and cheeses.

In the old times, Laskiainen was a time to eat hearty amounts of meat, because the next opportunity to eat meat only came on Easter after fasting. Traditional Laskiainen foods included fatty rieska bread and meat soup. The rieska bread was made from barley and spiced with pork fat. The meat soup was cooked from peas and rye grain and spiced with pig feet or pig head. The soup was also called pig foot soup.

Desserts are also an integral part of Laskiainen. The best-known Laskiainen dessert, often enjoyed either with coffee or tea, is laskiaispulla, which is a sweet roll filled with almond paste or strawberry jam, and whipped cream. This pastry started becoming common in the 19th century.

There were also beliefs about food. Most importantly, food had to be fatty. The more fat glistened on people's fingers and mouths, the more milk the cows gave and the fattier the pigs got, the better. Greasy fingers should not be wiped clean; instead the grease had to be left to clean away on its own. This guaranteed good skills with a scythe. Those who licked their fingers would wound themselves with a scythe. When food was left on the table for the whole day, this guaranteed plenty of food for the rest of the year.

== Laskiainen in North America ==
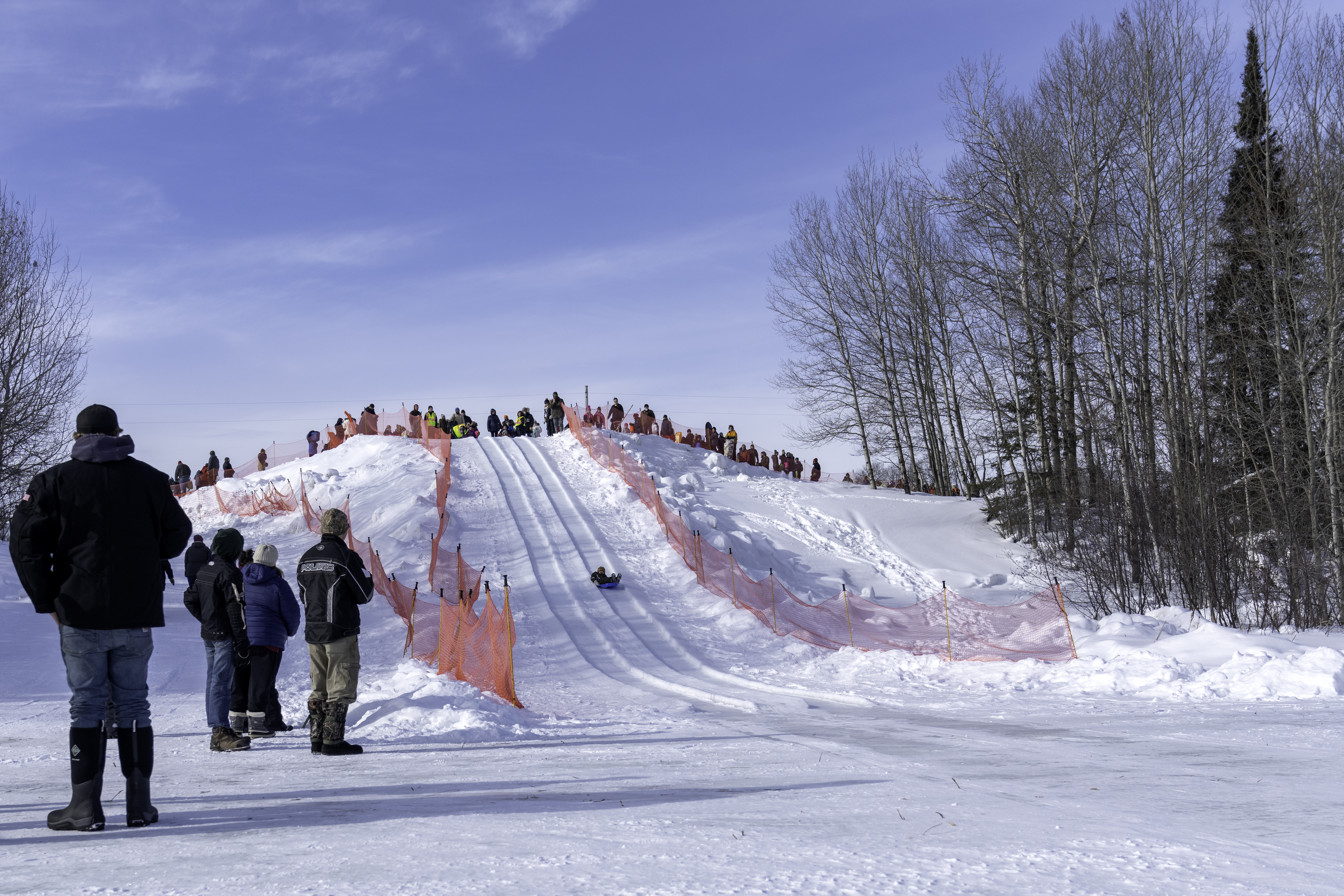
Ice slide at Laskiainen in Palo, Minnesota, US

In North America too, it is traditional in Laskiainen to have a meal of split pea soup with ham, and for amusement – as in Finland – to slide down a hill on either snow-covered or iced tracks, often on toboggans.

One of the places where Laskiainen is celebrated outside Europe in form of an annual festival is the community of Palo, located between Aurora and Makinen on the shores of Loon Lake in Minnesota. With this celebration, Palo is the home for one of the longest continuously held annual Finnish-American festivals in the United States, others being e.g. various Saint Urho's Day festivals held each 16 March both in Canada and the United States, and the FinnFest USA festivals, which have taken place in locations throughout the United States, typically hosted by communities with connections to Finnish-American cultural history.

Many Finnish-North-American groups and clubs host various Laskiainen celebrations, but the one which developed in Palo in the 1930s is notable for both its size and longevity.
