= Shrove Tuesday: The Legend of Pancake Marion =

Shrove Tuesday
- Directed by: Lee Andrew Matthews
- Written by: Lee Matthews
- Release date: 2009
- Running time: 22 minutes
- Country: United Kingdom
- Language: English

Shrove Tuesday, also known as Shrove Tuesday: The Legend of Pancake Marion, is a 22-minute short film, stylistically based on the fairytales created by the Brothers Grimm. It was produced in the United Kingdom in 2009, and directed by Lee Andrew Matthews.

It tells the story of Pancake Marion, an 18th-century Witch, who was burned alive for her 'blasphemous' ways. Her evil spirit returned whenever a protective flower (planted to keep her at bay) had wilted, or was picked by local children. A young girl finds and picks the flower, which sets off the events of the short.

Shrove Tuesday won Best British Film at Horror UK's 28 Hours Later film festival, Best Experimental Short at South Africa's Horror Fest V, and Best Mythic Film at Vampire Film Festival, New Orleans. The film has been screened at the New York City Horror Film Festival, and The Spooky Movie Film Festival in Washington DC.

== See also ==
- Shrove Tuesday, day preceding Ash Wednesday
