= Children's sermon =

Christian religious practice

A children's sermon or children's homily or children's message is a part of a church service dedicated to communicating an abbreviated Christian message that is palatable to small children. It might be thought of as a mini-sermon for children.

Children's messages are common part of the liturgy in Reformed churches, as well as in other Christian denominations. The message may be given by the pastor or a lay leader (such as the superintendent of Christian education). For a typical message, the children are asked to gather at the chancel steps and face the pews. The pastor may have some sort of object or tactile teaching aid to focus the children's attention on the topic. The sermon typically lasts two to three minutes and may end in a brief prayer.

Children's messages are often related to the main sermon and may prepare the congregation for it.

In cases of family integrated churches, children return to their pews to sit with their family for the remainder of the Divine Service; in other churches, the children may be dismissed to Sunday School following the children's sermon.

== See also ==
- Sunday school

== Sources ==
- https://web.archive.org/web/20050818182953/http://www.butlerumc.org/Childrens%20Message.htm
- https://web.archive.org/web/20060720184635/http://talkingdonkey.worldmagblog.com/talkingdonkey/archives/015547.html
