= Shrovetide =

Liturgical period

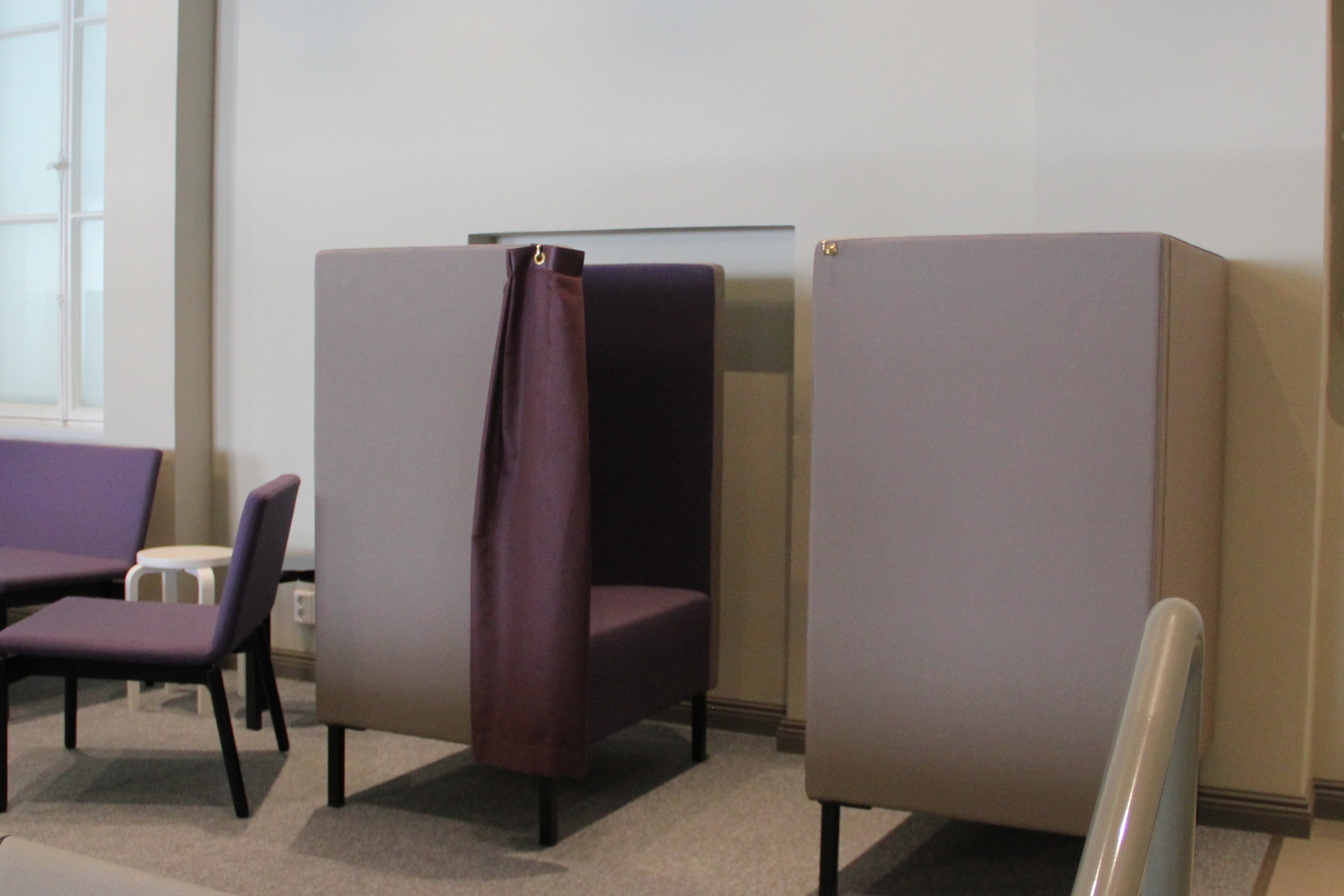
During Shrovetide, and especially on Shrove Tuesday, many Christians confess their sins, in preparation for the somber season Lent. Shown is an Evangelical Lutheran confessional in Luther Church, Helsinki, Finland

Shrovetide is the Christian liturgical period prior to the start of Lent that begins on Shrove Sunday and ends at the close of Shrove Tuesday. The season focuses on examination of conscience and repentance before the Lenten fast. It includes, Shrove Sunday, Shrove Monday and Shrove Tuesday.

During Shrovetide, Christians traditionally eat rich foods containing meat, eggs, dairy products, and alcohol, using up the ingredients as these things are not enjoyed during the 40-day fasting season of Lent. This practice continues in Eastern Christianity and among Western Christian congregations practicing the Daniel Fast.

== Etymology ==
The expression "Shrovetide" comes from the word shrive, referring to the receiving of absolution following confession.

== Observances ==
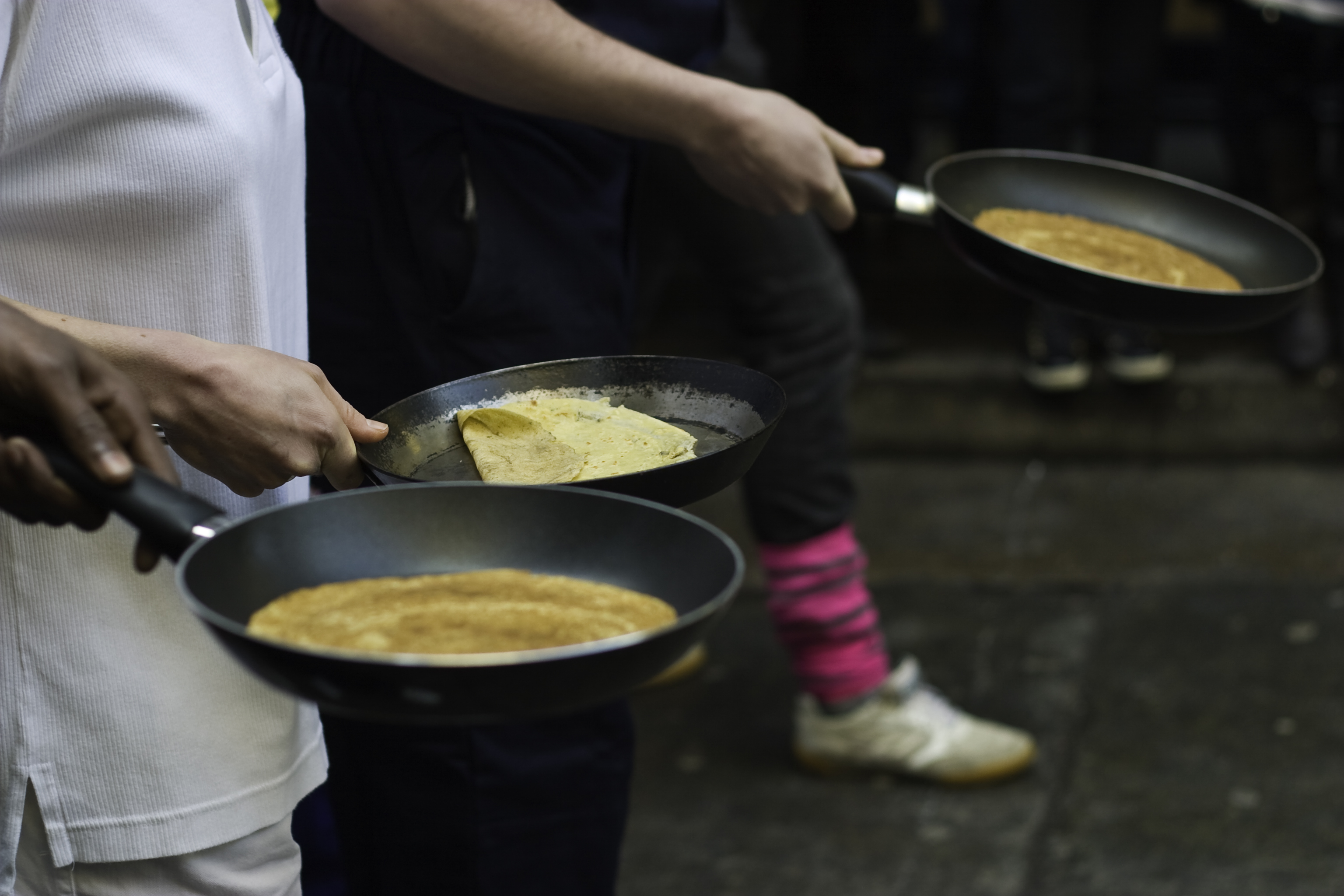
Many Christian congregations celebrate Shrovetide through pancake breakfasts, which are held on Shrove Monday or Shrove Tuesday.

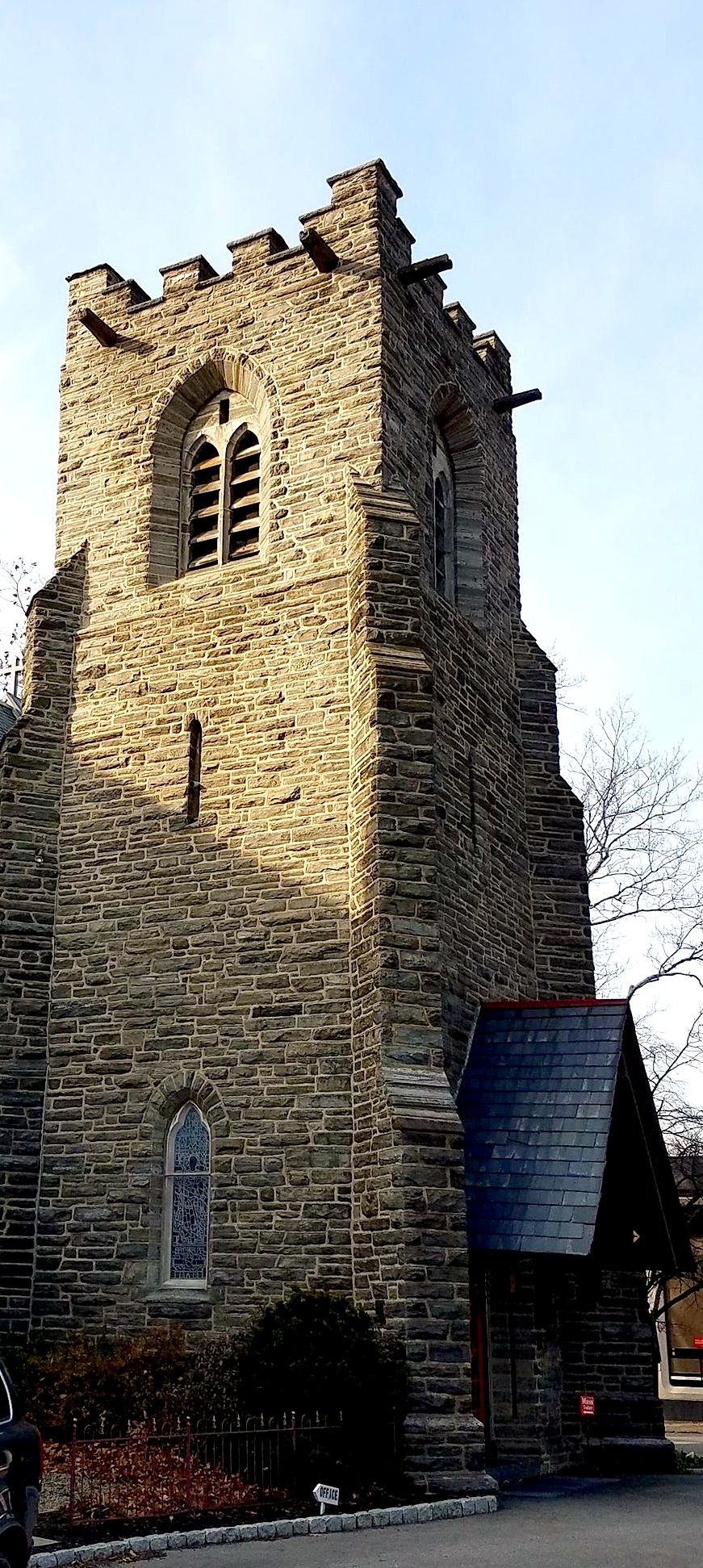
Church bells of Catholic, Lutheran and Anglican congregations ring on Shrove Tuesday (the Shriving Bell) reminding the faithful to confess their sins on Shrove Tuesday

The Shrovetide season focuses on examination of conscience and repentance before the Lenten fast. As such, during Shrovetide, many traditional Christians, such as Roman Catholics, Lutherans and Anglicans, "make a special point of self-examination, of considering what wrongs they need to repent, and what amendments of life or areas of spiritual growth they especially need to ask God's help in dealing with." The 11th century Ecclesiastical Institutes enjoined: "In the week immediately before Lent everyone shall go to his confessor and confess his deeds and the confessor shall so shrive him as he then may hear by his deeds what he is to do [in the way of penance]". Participation in confession and absolution is therefore paradigmatic of Shrovetide, especially Shrove Tuesday.

It is customary for Christians during Shrovetide to ponder what Lenten sacrifices they will make for Lent. While making a Lenten sacrifice, it is customary to pray for strength to keep it for the 40-day fasting season of Lent; many often wish others for doing so as well, e.g. "May God bless your Lenten sacrifice."

Many churches place a basket in the narthex during Shrovetide to collect the previous year's Holy Week palm branches that were blessed and distributed during the Palm Sunday liturgies. On Shrove Tuesday, churches burn these palms to make the ashes used during the services held on the very next day, Ash Wednesday.

During the liturgical season of Lent, believers have historically abstained from rich foods such as meat, eggs, dairy products, and alcohol — a practice that continues in Eastern Christianity (in denominations such as the Coptic Orthodox Church) and among Western Christian congregations practicing the Daniel Fast. Shrovetide provided Christians with the opportunity to use up these foods prior to the start of the 40-day fasting season of Lent. Prior to the 6th century, Lent was normatively observed through the practice of the Black Fast, which enjoins fasting from food and liquids, with the allowance of one vegetarian meal after sunset. The tradition of pancake breakfasts during Shrovetide, as well as that of pancake races, owes itself to this practice of "using up the surplus eggs, milk and butter" prior to Lent. In many Christian parish churches, both Protestant and Roman Catholic, a popular Shrove Tuesday tradition is the ringing of the church bells (on this day, the toll is known as the Shriving Bell) "to call the faithful to confession before the solemn season of Lent" and for people to "begin frying their pancakes".

As such, a hallmark of Shrovetide is the opportunity for a last round of merrymaking associated with Carnival and Fastelavn before the start of the somber Lenten season; the traditions of carrying Shrovetide rods and consuming Shrovetide buns after attending church are celebrated. In England, games of mob football were popular during Shrovetide; a few survivors of this tradition include the Royal Shrovetide Football in Ashbourne, Derbyshire.

Lutheran countries such as Denmark mark Shrove Sunday (Quinquagesima Sunday) as the peak of the Fastelavn. After attending the Mass on Shrove Sunday, congregants enjoy Shrovetide buns (fastelavnsboller), "round sweet buns that are covered with icing and filled with cream and/or jam." Children often dress up and collect money from people while singing. They practice a tradition of hitting a barrel, which represents fighting Satan. After doing this, children enjoy the sweets inside the barrel. Lutheran Christians in these nations carry Shrovetide rods (fastelavnsris), which "branches decorated with sweets, little presents, etc., that are used to decorate the home or give to children."
