= Shrove Monday =

Monday before Ash Wednesday

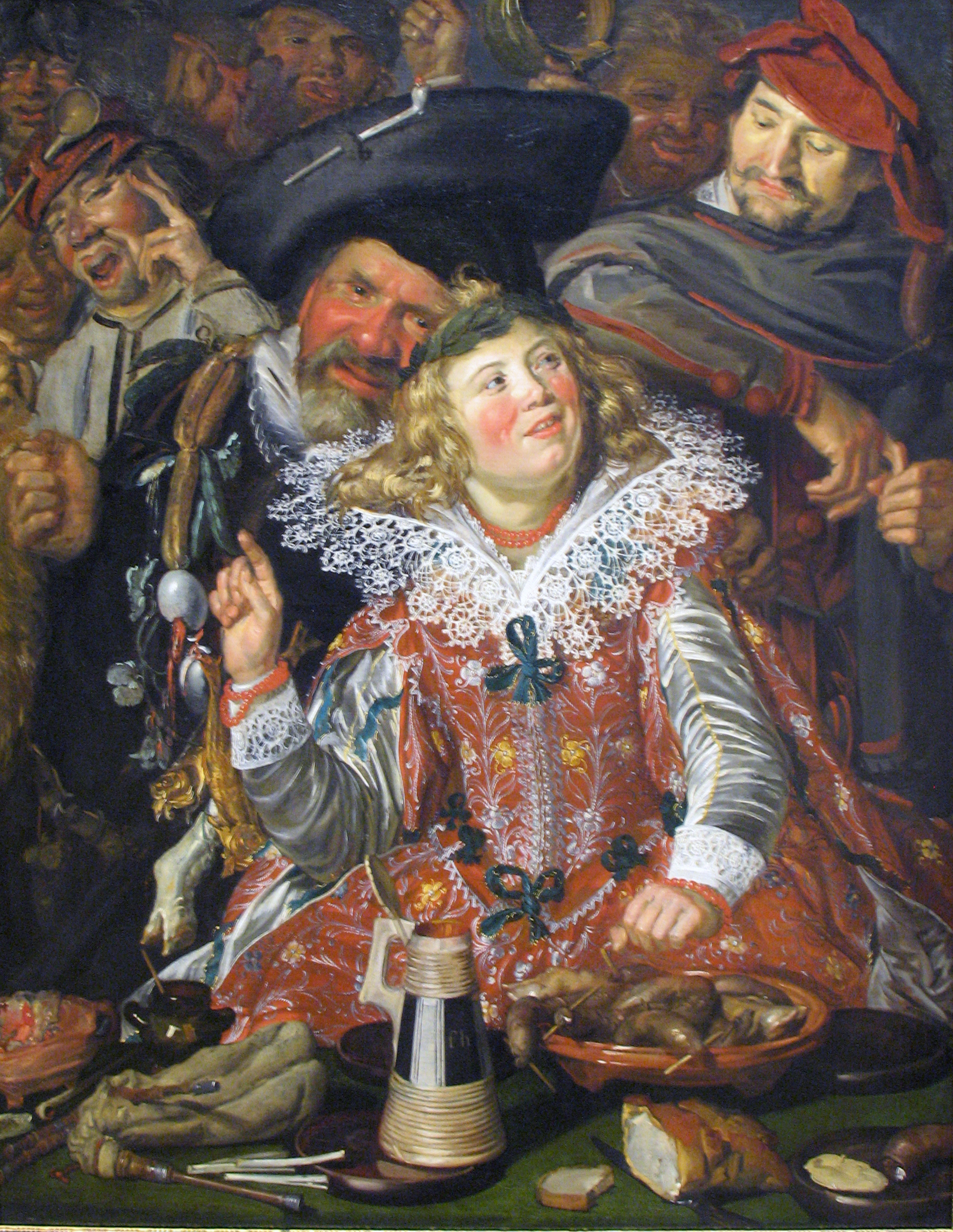
- Frans Hals, Merrymakers at Shrovetide (c. 1616–1617)
- Date: Monday before Ash Wednesday
- 2025 date: March 3
- 2026 date: February 16
- 2027 date: February 8
- 2028 date: February 28
- Frequency: Annual

Shrove Monday (also known as Collopy Monday, Rose Monday, Merry Monday or Hall Monday) is part of the Shrovetide or Carnival observances and celebrations of the week before Lent, following Quinquagesima or Shrove Sunday and preceding Shrove Tuesday or Mardi Gras.

== Shrovetide ==
The word shrove is the past tense of the English verb shrive, which means to give absolution for someone's sins by way of confession and forgiveness. Thus Shrovetide gets its name from the shriving that English Christians were expected to do prior to receiving absolution immediately before Lent begins. Shrove Tuesday is the last day of "shrovetide", somewhat analogous to the Carnival tradition that developed separately in countries of Latin Europe. The terms "Shrove Monday" and "Shrove Tuesday" are no longer widely used in the United States or Canada outside of liturgical traditions, such as in the Lutheran, Anglican, and Roman Catholic Churches.

== Collopy Monday ==
The British name Collopy Monday is after the traditional dish of the day, consisting of slices of leftover meat (collops of bacon) along with eggs. It is eaten for breakfast and is part of the traditional Lenten preparations. In addition to providing a little meat, the collops were also the source of the fat for the following day's pancakes. It is rarely celebrated these days.

In east Cornwall, it is sometimes called Peasen Monday or Paisen Monday after the custom of eating pea soup on that day.

== German carnivals ==
Shrove Monday (German Rosenmontag, Danish: fastelavnsmandag) is part of the German, Danish, and Austrian Carnival calendar. In the Rhineland, as part of the pre-lenten Fasching festival (or Feast of Fools), it is part of the parade season, a day of marching, revelry, and satirical floats.

== Eastern Orthodox traditions ==
In the Eastern Orthodox liturgical calendar (most years falling later than the Western Church, usually in March), the start of Lent is called Clean Monday. This is not identical to Shrove Monday, which precedes the start of (Western) Lent by two days. Clean Monday is the first day of the Great Lent, and is traditionally considered the beginning of spring in Greece and Cyprus, where it is a Bank Holiday. Different traditions take place in different localities. In the town of Tyrnavos, for instance, feasts are followed by songs and dances with Bacchic overtones.

== Caribbean ==
In the 19th-century Trinidad and Tobago Carnival, a kambule (procession of people holding torches) took place in the earliest hours of Shrove Monday.

Carnival Monday is a national holiday in Aruba, with the purpose of resting after the Carnival.

== Lundi Gras ==
The Shrove Monday events of the New Orleans and Mississippi Gulf Coast Mardi Gras, dating back to the 19th century, have since the late 20th century been named Lundi Gras ("Fat Monday").

== See also ==
- Nickanan Night
- Fat Thursday
