= Shrove Tuesday =

Tuesday before Ash Wednesday

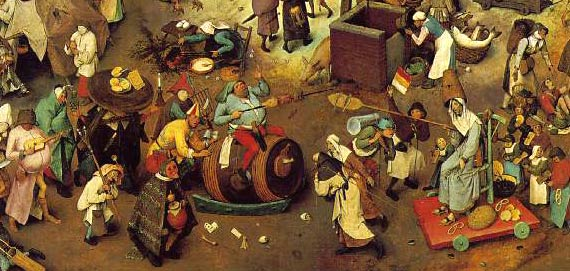
- Bruegel the Elder: The Fight Between Carnival and Lent (detail), 1559
- Also called: Pancake Day; Mardi Gras
- Observed by: Christians (including Catholics, Lutherans, Anglicans and Methodists)
- Observances: Confession, burning of Palm Sunday branches, eating pancakes
- Date: Last day of Carnival or Shrovetide. The day before Ash Wednesday. 47 days before the Western Easter Sunday.
- 2026 date: February 17
- 2027 date: February 9

Shrove Tuesday (also known as Mardi Gras, Pancake Tuesday, or Pancake Day) is the final day of Shrovetide, which marks the end of the pre-Lenten season. Lent begins the following day with Ash Wednesday. Shrove Tuesday is observed in many Christian countries through participating in confession, the ritual burning of the previous year's Holy Week palms, finalizing one's Lenten sacrifice, as well as eating pancakes and other sweets.

Shrove Tuesday is observed by many Christians, including Anglicans, Lutherans, Methodists, Western-rite Orthodox Christians, and Roman Catholics, who "make a special point of self-examination, of considering what wrongs they need to repent, and what amendments of life or areas of spiritual growth they especially need to ask God's help in dealing with." This moveable feast is determined by the date of Easter. The expression "Shrove Tuesday" comes from the word shrive, meaning absolution following confession. Christians traditionally visit their church on Shrove Tuesday to confess their sins and clean their soul, thus being shriven (absolved) before the start of Lent. In a number of Christian churches of the Roman Catholic and Lutheran traditions, the sacrament of confession is offered.

As this is the last day of the Christian liturgical season historically known as Carnival or Shrovetide, before the penitential season of Lent, related popular practices, such as indulging in food that one might give up as their Lenten sacrifice for the upcoming forty days, are associated with Shrove Tuesday celebrations. The term Mardi Gras is French for "Fat Tuesday", referring to the practice of the last night of eating richer, fatty foods before the ritual fasting of the Lenten season, which begins on Ash Wednesday. Many Christian congregations thus observe the day through eating pancakes or, more specifically, the holding of pancake breakfasts, as well as the ringing of church bells to remind people to repent of their sins before the start of Lent. On Shrove Tuesday, churches also burn the palms distributed during the previous year's Palm Sunday liturgies to make the ashes used during the services held on the very next day, Ash Wednesday.

In some Christian countries, especially those where the day is called Mardi Gras or a translation thereof, it is a carnival day, the last day of "fat eating" or "gorging" before the fasting period of Lent. Additionally, since 1958, the Roman Catholic Church celebrates the Feast of the Holy Face of Jesus on Shrove Tuesday.

== History ==
The tradition of marking the start of Lent has been documented for centuries. Ælfric of Eynsham's "Ecclesiastical Institutes" from around 1000 AD states: "In the week immediately before Lent everyone shall go to his confessor and confess his deeds and the confessor shall so shrive him as he then may hear by his deeds what he is to do [in the way of penance]". By the time of the late Middle Ages, the celebration of Shrovetide lasted until the start of Lent.

During the liturgical season of Lent, believers have historically abstained from rich foods such as meat, eggs, lacticinia (dairy products), and alcohol –a practice that continues in Eastern Christianity (in denominations such as the Coptic Orthodox Church) and among Western Christian congregations practicing the Daniel Fast. Shrovetide provided Christians with the opportunity to use up these foods prior to the start of the 40-day fasting season of Lent. Prior to the 6th century, Lent was normatively observed through the practice of the Black Fast, which enjoins fasting from food and liquids, with the allowance of one vegetarian meal after sunset. The tradition of pancake breakfasts during Shrovetide, as well as that of pancake races, owes itself to this practice of "using up the surplus eggs, milk and butter" prior to Lent. As such, it was traditional in many societies to eat pancakes or other foods made with the butter, eggs and fat or lard that would need to be used up before the beginning of Lent. Similar foods are fasnachts and pączki. The specific custom of British Christians eating pancakes on Shrove Tuesday dates to the 16th century.

Along with its emphasis on feasting, another theme of Shrove Tuesday involves Christians repenting of their sins in preparation to begin the season of Lent in the Christian liturgical calendar. In many Christian parish churches, both Protestant and Roman Catholic, a popular Shrove Tuesday tradition is the ringing of the church bells (on this day, the toll is known as the Shriving Bell) "to call the faithful to confession before the solemn season of Lent" and for people to "begin frying their pancakes".

== Terminology ==
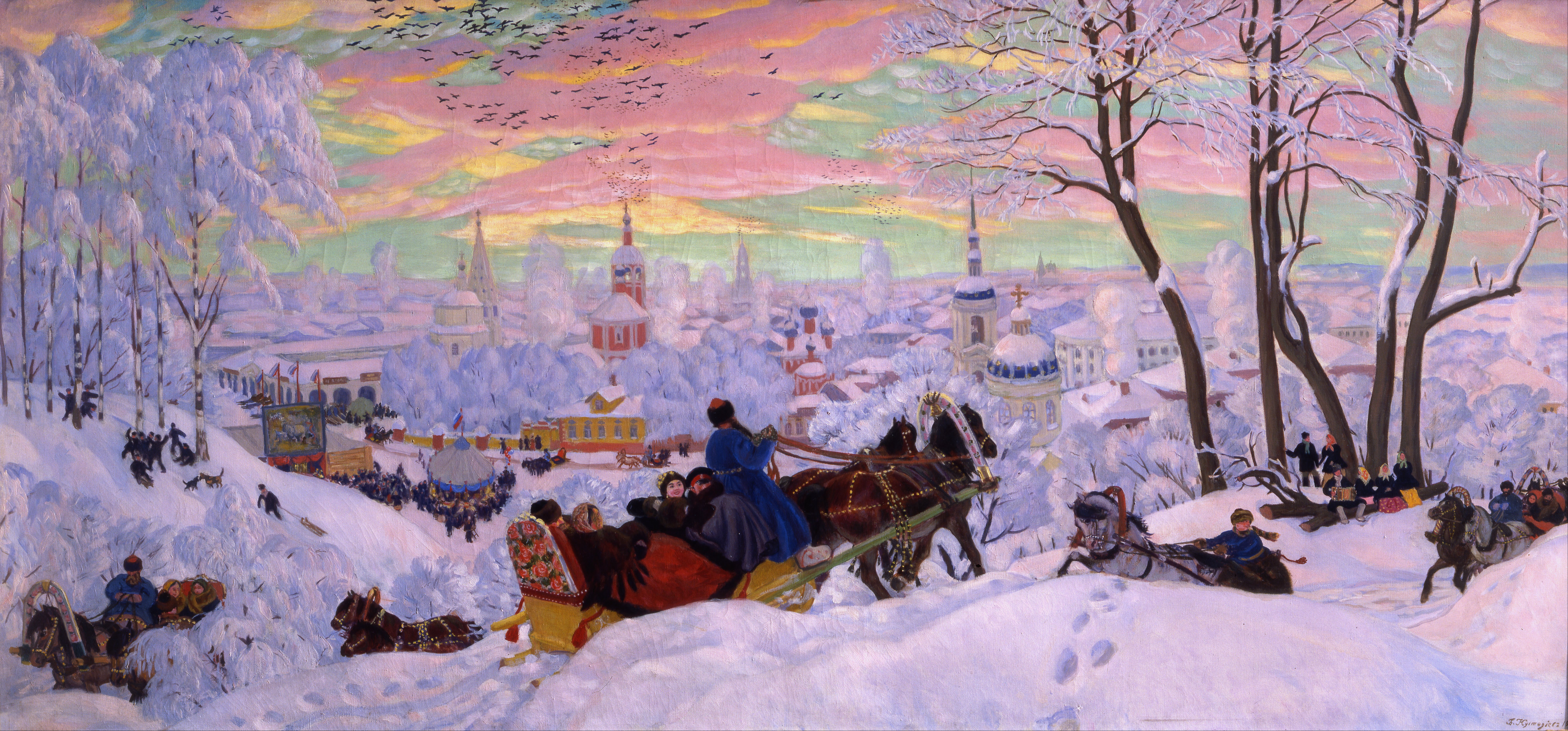
Russian artist Boris Kustodiev's Maslenitsa (1916)

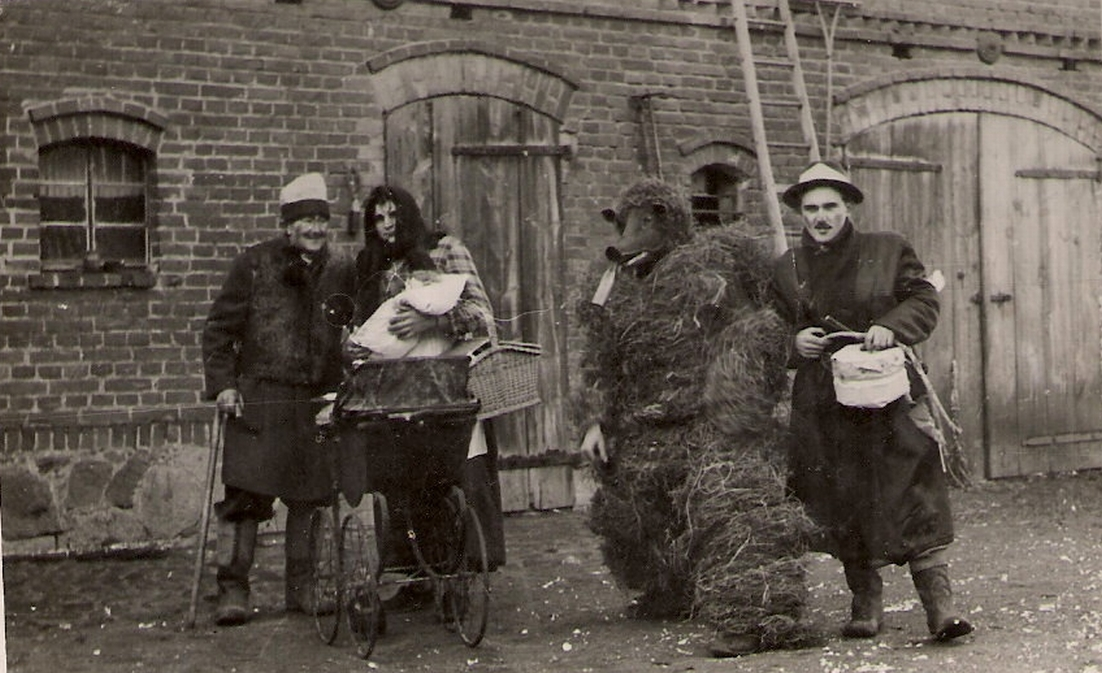
Shrove Tuesday, Bear guiding in Poland (1950)

The word shrove is a form of the English word shrive, which means to give absolution for someone's sins by way of Confession and doing penance. Thus Shrove Tuesday was named after the custom of Christians to be "shriven" before the start of Lent.

In the United Kingdom, Ireland and parts of the Commonwealth, Shrove Tuesday is also known as Pancake Day or Pancake Tuesday, as it became a traditional custom to eat pancakes as a meal. In Irish the day is known as Máirt Inide, from the Latin initium (Jejūniī), "beginning of Lent". Elsewhere, the day has also been called "Mardi Gras", meaning "Fat Tuesday", after the type of celebratory meal that day.

In Germany, the day is known as Fastnachtsdienstag, Faschingsdienstag, Karnevalsdienstag or Veilchendienstag (the last of which translates to violet [the flower] Tuesday). It is celebrated with fancy dress and a partial school holiday. Similarly, in German American areas, such as Pennsylvania Dutch Country, it is known as Fastnacht Day.

In the Netherlands, it is known as "vastenavond", or in Limburgish dialect "vastelaovend", though the word "vastelaovend" usually refers to the entire period of carnival in the Netherlands. In some parts of Switzerland (e.g. Lucerne), the day is called Güdeldienstag or Güdisdienstag (preceded by Güdismontag). According to the Duden dictionary, the term derives from "Güdel", which means a fat belly stuffed full of food.

In Portuguese-, Spanish- and Italian-speaking countries, among others, it is known as Carnival (to use the English spelling). This derives from Medieval Latin carnelevamen ("the putting away of flesh") and thus to another aspect of the Lenten fast, to abstain from eating meat. It is often celebrated with street processions or fancy dress.

The most famous of these events has become the Brazilian Carnival in Rio de Janeiro. Venetians have long celebrated carnival with a masquerade. The use of the term "carnival" in other contexts derives from this celebration. In Spain, the Carnival Tuesday is named "día de la tortilla" ("omelette day"): an omelette made with some sausage or pork fat is eaten. On the Portuguese island of Madeira, malasadas are eaten on Terça-feira Gorda (Fat Tuesday in English), which is also the last day of the Carnival of Madeira. Malasadas were cooked in order to use up all the lard and sugar in the house, in preparation for Lenten restrictions. This tradition was taken to Hawaii, where Shrove Tuesday is known as Malasada Day, which dates back to the days of the sugar plantations of the 1800s. The resident Catholic Portuguese workers (who came mostly from Madeira and the Azores) used up butter and sugar prior to Lent by making large batches of malasadas.

In the Lutheran countries of Denmark and Norway, the Tuesday before Ash Wednesday is called Fetetirsdag ("Fat Tuesday"); the prior weekend is known as Fastelavn and is marked by eating fastelavnsboller. Fastelavn is the name for Carnival in Denmark, held either on the Sunday or Monday before Ash Wednesday. This holiday occurs seven weeks before Easter Sunday, with children dressing up in costumes and gathering treats for the Fastelavn feast. The holiday is generally considered to be a time for children's fun and family games and on Shrove Sunday, "the churches hold a special family service where children are invited to wear fancy dress."

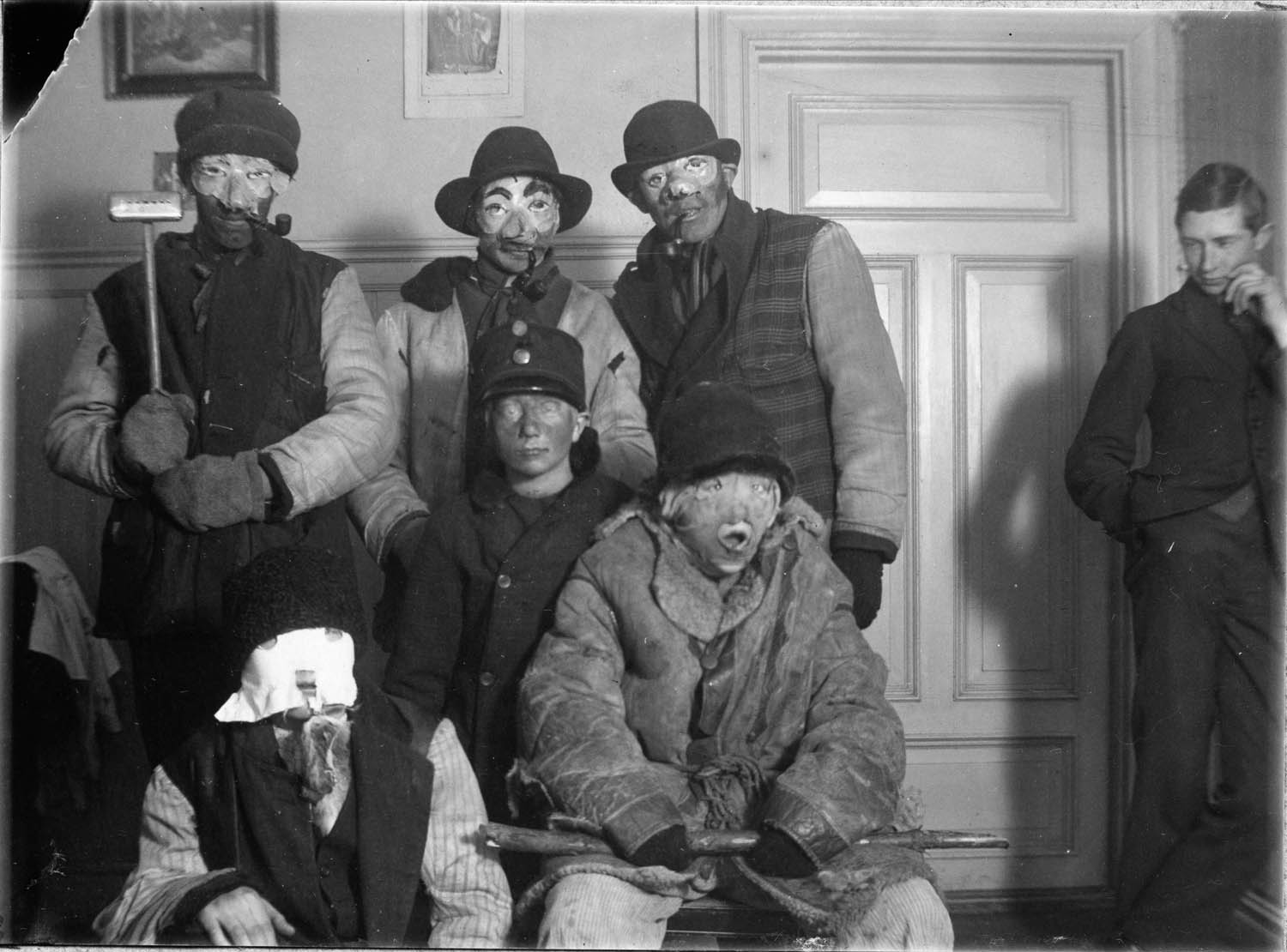
People in Alfta, Sweden, masquerading as Fettisdagsgubbar in traditional celebration of Shrove Tuesday.

In Iceland, the day is known as Sprengidagur (Bursting Day) and is marked by eating salted meat and peas. In Lithuania, the day is called Užgavėnės. People eat pancakes (blynai) and Lithuanian-style doughnuts.

In Sweden, the day is called Fettisdagen (Fat Tuesday), and is generally celebrated by eating a type of almond paste-filled sweet roll called semla or fastlagsbulle. In Finland, the day is called laskiainen and is generally celebrated by eating green pea soup and semla, in Finland known as laskiaispulla or fastlagsbulle, and typically filled with whipped cream and jam or almond paste. In Estonia, the day is similarly called Vastlapäev and is generally celebrated by eating pea soup and whipped-cream or jam and whipped-cream filled sweet-buns called vastlakukkel, similar to the semla. Children also typically go sledding on this day.

In Poland, a related celebration falls on the Thursday before Ash Wednesday and is called tłusty czwartek (Fat Thursday). In some areas of the United States with large Polish-American communities, such as Chicago, Milwaukee, Detroit, and Buffalo, Tłusty Czwartek is celebrated with pączki or faworki eating contests, music and other Polish food. It may be held on Shrove Tuesday or in the days immediately preceding it.

In Slovenia, Kurentovanje is also the biggest and best known carnival. There are several more local carnivals usually referred to as Laufarija. In Hungary, and the Hungarian-speaking territories, it is called Húshagyókedd (lit. 'the Tuesday leaving the meat') and is celebrated by fancy dress and visiting neighbours.

== Traditions ==
Shrove Tuesday serves a dual purpose of allowing Christians to repent of any sins they might have committed before the start of Lent on the next day Ash Wednesday and giving them the opportunity to engage in a last round of merriment before the start of the somber Lenten season, which is characterized by making a Lenten sacrifice, fasting, praying and engaging in various spiritual disciplines, such as marking a Lenten calendar, fasting, abstaining from luxuries, and reading a daily devotional.

The Lenten fast traditionally emphasizes eating simpler, vegetarian food, and refraining from food that would give undue pleasure; as such, Christians historically abstained from meat, eggs and lacticinia (dairy products) during the 40-day fasting season of Lent—a practice that continues in Eastern Christianity and among Western Christian congregations practicing the Daniel Fast. Pancakes are associated with Shrove Tuesday, the day preceding Lent, because they are a way to use up rich foods such as eggs, milk, and sugar, before the fasting season of the 40 days of Lent.

In Newfoundland and Cape Breton Island, small tokens are frequently cooked in the pancakes. Children take delight in discovering the objects, which are intended to be divinatory. For example, the person who receives a coin will be wealthy; a nail indicates that they will become or marry a carpenter.

=== Observances ===
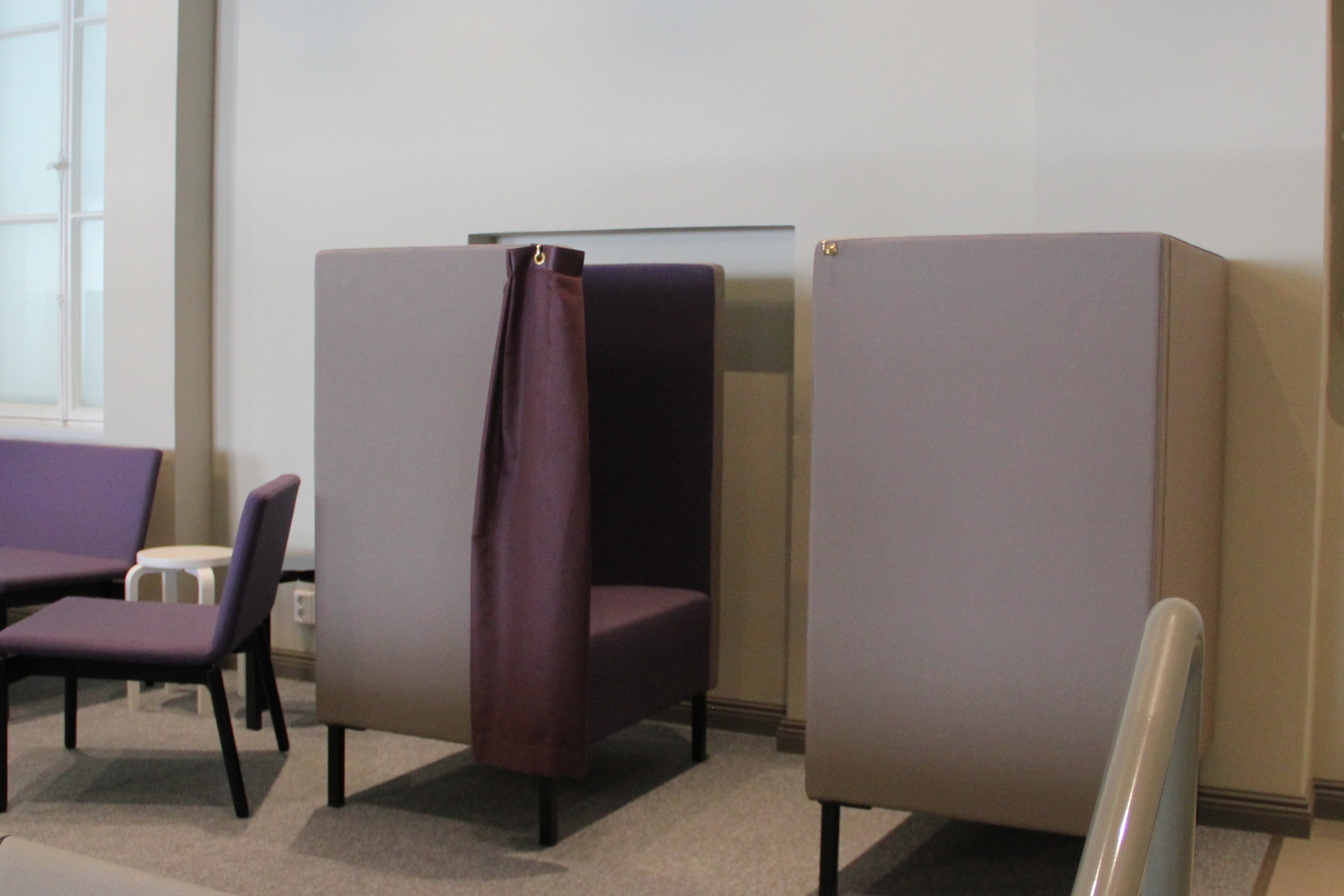
On Shrove Tuesday, many Christians confess their sins, in preparation for Lent; depicted is an Evangelical Lutheran confessional in Luther Church (Helsinki, Finland)

On the final day of Shrovetide—Shrove Tuesday—many believers belonging to liturgical branches of Christianity, such as Roman Catholics, Lutherans, and Anglicans, as well as some Baptists, Methodists and Reformed Christians, "make a special point of self-examination, of considering what wrongs they need to repent, and what amendments of life or areas of spiritual growth they especially need to ask God's help in dealing with." As such, many churches (particularly those of the Catholic and Lutheran traditions) offer Confession on Shrove Tuesday.

On Shrove Tuesday, many Christians finalize their decision with respect to what Lenten sacrifices they will make for Lent. While making a Lenten sacrifice, it is customary to pray for strength to keep it; many often wish others for doing so as well, e.g. "May God bless your Lenten sacrifice."

During Shrovetide, many churches place a basket in the narthex to collect the previous year's Holy Week palm branches that were blessed and distributed during the Palm Sunday liturgies; on Shrove Tuesday, churches burn these palms to make the ashes used during the services held on the very next day, Ash Wednesday.

=== Festivities ===
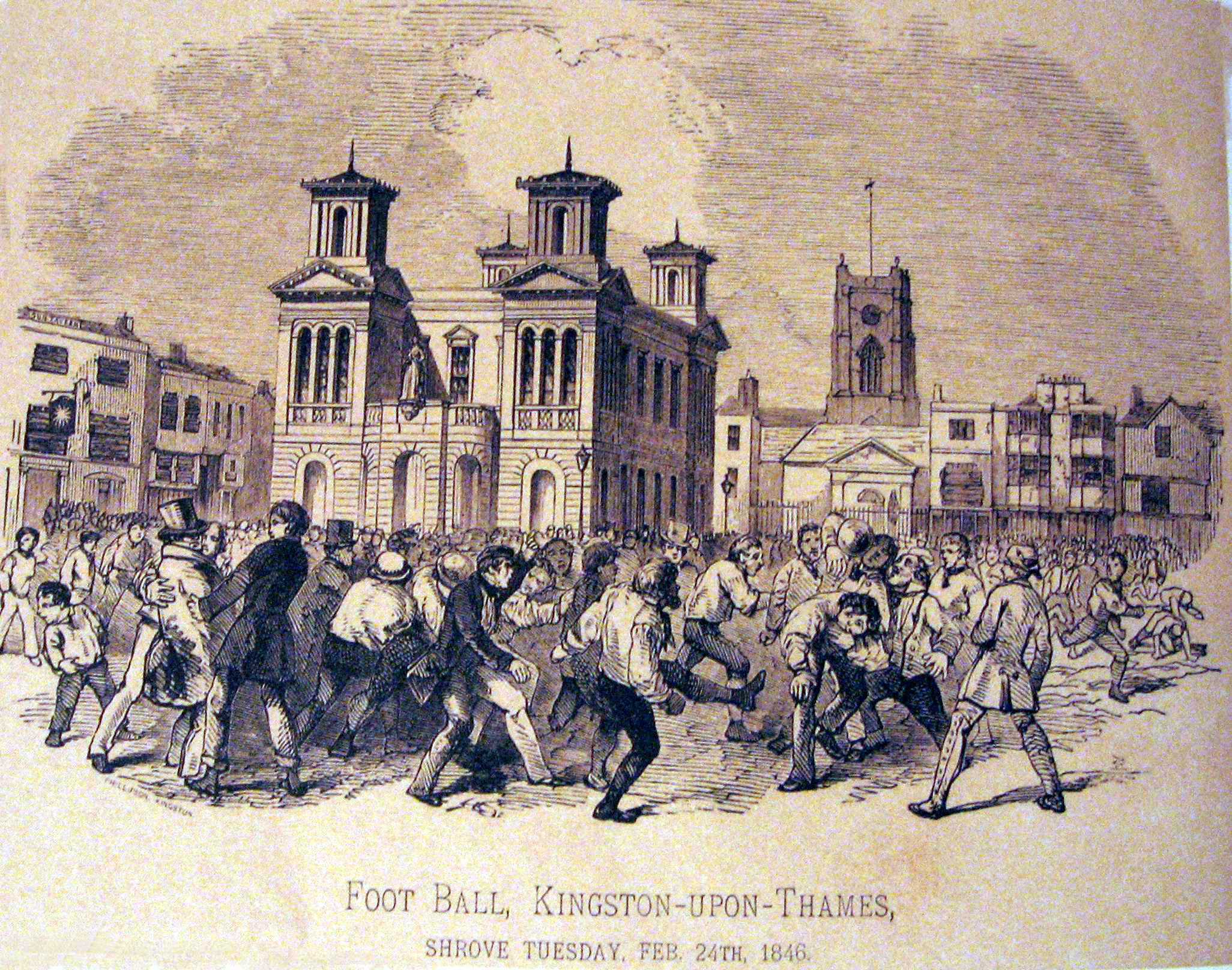
Football match in the 1846 Shrove Tuesday in Kingston upon Thames, England

In the United Kingdom, as part of community celebration, many towns held traditional Shrove Tuesday "mob football" games, some dating as far back as the 17th century. The practice mostly died out in the 19th century after the passing of the Highway Act 1835 which banned playing football on public highways. A number of towns have maintained the tradition, including Alnwick in Northumberland (Scoring the Hales), Ashbourne in Derbyshire (called the Royal Shrovetide Football), Atherstone in Warwickshire (called simply the Atherstone Ball Game), St Columb Major in Cornwall (called Hurling the Silver Ball), and Sedgefield in County Durham (Sedgefield Ball Game).

Shrove Tuesday was once known as a "half-holiday" in Britain. It started at 11:00 am with the ringing of a church bell. On Pancake Day, "pancake races" are held in villages and towns across the United Kingdom. The tradition is said to have originated in 1445 when a housewife from Olney, Buckinghamshire, was so busy making pancakes that she forgot the time until she heard the church bells ringing for the service. She raced out of the house to church while still carrying her frying pan and pancake, tossing it to prevent it from burning. The pancake race remains a relatively common festive tradition in the UK, especially England. Participants with frying pans race through the streets tossing pancakes into the air and catching them in the pan while running. The pancake race at Olney traditionally has women contestants who carry a frying pan and race over a 415-yard (379 m) course to the finishing line. The rules are strict: contestants must toss the pancake at the start and the finish, and wear a scarf and apron.

Since 1950, the people of Liberal, Kansas, and Olney have held the "International Pancake Day" race between the two towns. The two towns' competitors race along an agreed-upon measured course. The times of the two towns' competitors are compared to determine a winner overall. As of 2021, Liberal leads the competition with 38 wins to Olney's 31. A similar race is held in North Somercotes in Lincolnshire, England.

In London, the Rehab Parliamentary Pancake Race takes place every Shrove Tuesday, with teams from the British lower house (the House of Commons), the upper house (the House of Lords), and the Fourth Estate, contending for the title of Parliamentary Pancake Race Champions. The fun relay race is to raise awareness of Rehab, which provides a range of health and social care, training, education, and employment services in the UK for disabled people and others who are marginalised.

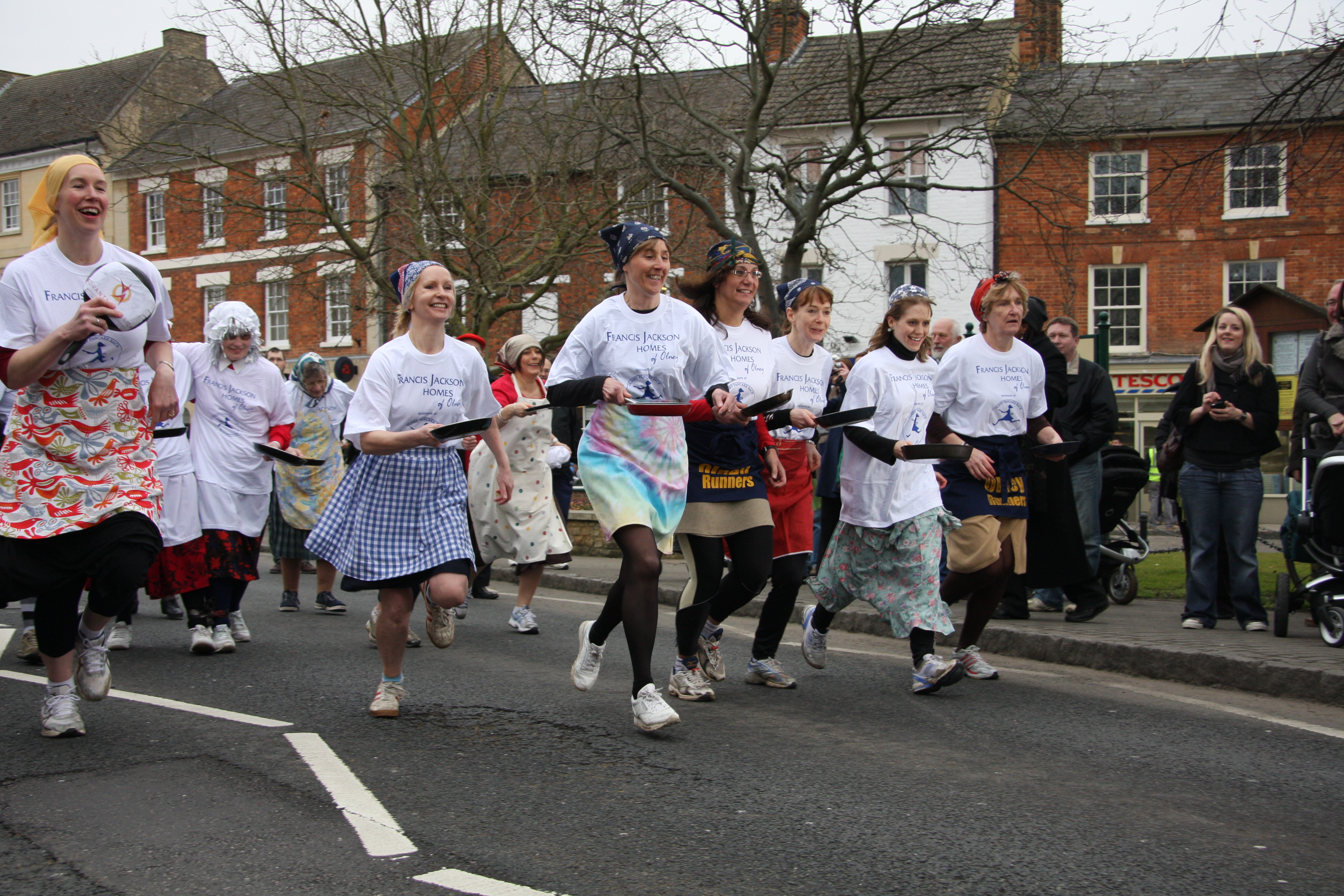
A pancake race in Olney, Buckinghamshire, 2009

Scarborough celebrates by closing the foreshore to all traffic, closing schools early, and inviting all to skip. Traditionally, long ropes were used from the nearby harbour. The town crier rang the pancake bell, situated on the corner of Westborough (main street) and Huntriss Row. Since 1996 a replica "pancake bell" situated at Newborough and North Street has been rung to initiate the day's festivities.

Shrove Tuesday in England often involved a form of ritual begging, not dissimilar to wassailing, in which children and adolescents would go door-to-door asking for tidbits from the frying pan. If the household was not forthcoming, they could expect levels of mischief, including the pelting of their house, knock and run, or gate stealing. This was known as Lent Crocking, Nicky-Nan Night, the Drawing of Cloam, Dappy-Door Night, or Pan Sharding. The children of the hamlet of Whitechapel, Lancashire, keep alive a local variant of this tradition by visiting local households and asking "please a pancake", to be rewarded with oranges or sweets. It is thought this local tradition arose when farm workers visited the wealthier farm and manor owners to ask for pancakes or pancake fillings.

In Ireland, the observance of fasting at Lent continued up to the 20th century, with Shrove Tuesday (Irish: Máirt na hInide, "Tuesday of the initium") marking the last day of the consumption of meat for the Lenten period. This was later relaxed, but with three days of fasting observed, Ash Wednesday, Spy Wednesday, and Good Friday. It was a tradition that the eldest unmarried daughter would toss the first pancake. If the pancake fell on the floor, she would remain unmarried for the next 12 months. As marriages were not traditionally permitted during the Lenten period, as decreed by the Council of Trent, weddings on Shrove Tuesday were popular. In some parts of Ireland the holly from Christmas was saved and burnt in the fire for the pancakes. The night was also known as "Skellig Night" in Counties Cork and Kerry, during the celebrations, those who were unmarried were taunted with jeers and singing.

Thin pancakes called blini are traditional in Christian festivals in Belarus, Ukraine and Russia also at this time of year (Maslenitsa).

== Dates ==
Shrove Tuesday and other named days and day ranges around Lent and Easter in Western Christianity, with the fasting days of Lent numbered

Shrove Tuesday is exactly 47 days before Easter Sunday, a moveable feast based on the cycles of the moon. The date can be between 3 February and 9 March inclusive.

Shrove Tuesday occurs on these dates:

2026 – February 17
2027 – February 9
2028 – February 29
2029 – February 13
2030 – March 5
2031 – February 25
2032 – February 10
2033 – March 1
2034 – February 21
2035 – February 6
2036 – February 26
2037 – February 17
2038 – March 9
2039 – February 22
2040 – February 14
2041 – March 5
2042 – February 18
2043 – February 10
2044 – March 1
2045 – February 21
2046 – February 6
2047 – February 26
2048 – February 18
2049 – March 2
2050 – February 22
2051 – February 14
2052 – March 5
2053 – February 18
2054 – February 10
2055 – March 2
2056 – February 15
2057 – March 6
2058 – February 26
2059 – February 11
2060 – March 2
2061 – February 22
2062 – February 7
2063 – February 27
2064 – February 19
2065 – February 10
2066 – February 23
2067 – February 15
2068 – March 6
2069 – February 26
2070 – February 11
2071 – March 3
2072 – February 23
2073 – February 7
2074 – February 27
2075 – February 19
2076 – March 3
2077 – February 23
2078 – February 15
2079 – March 7
2080 – February 20
2081 – February 11
2082 – March 3
2083 – February 16
2084 – February 8
2085 – February 27
2086 – February 12
2087 – March 4
2088 – February 24
2089 – February 15
2090 – February 28
2091 – February 20
2092 – February 12
2093 – February 24
2094 – February 16
2095 – March 8
2096 – February 28
2097 – February 12
2098 – March 4
2099 – February 24
2100 – February 9

== See also ==
Related celebrations at the start of Lent

- Clean Monday
- Fat Thursday
- Laskiainen
- Mardi Gras
- Maslenitsa
- Nickanan Night
- Nuremberg Shrovetide Carnival
- Powder Day
- Shrove Monday
- Tsiknopempti
- Shrove Tuesday: The Legend of Pancake Marion
