= Herr Jesu Christ, wahr' Mensch und Gott, BWV 127 =

Bach cantata for Lutheran service

Herr Jesu Christ, wahr' Mensch und Gott
- BWV 127
- Chorale cantata by J. S. Bach
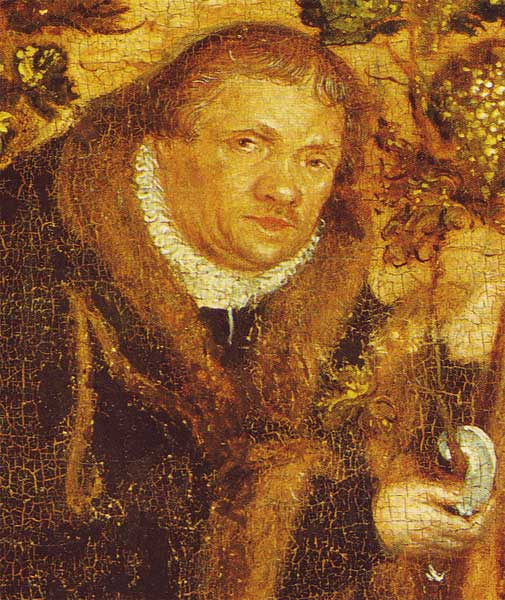
- Paul Eber, the author of the hymn
- Occasion: Estomihi
- Chorale: "Herr Jesu Christ, wahr Mensch und Gott"
- Performed: 11 February 1725: Leipzig
- Movements: 5
- Vocal: SATB choir; solo: soprano, tenor and bass
- Instrumental: trumpet; 2 recorders; 2 oboes; 2 violins; viola; continuo

Herr Jesu Christ, wahr' Mensch und Gott (Lord Jesus Christ, true Man and God), BWV 127, is a cantata by Johann Sebastian Bach for use in a Lutheran service. He composed the chorale cantata in 1725 in Leipzig for the Sunday Estomihi, the Sunday before Lent, and first performed it on 11 February 1725. It is based on Paul Eber's 1582 hymn in eight stanzas "Herr Jesu Christ, wahr Mensch und Gott".

In the format of the chorale cantata cycle, an unknown librettist retained the outer stanzas unchanged, but paraphrased the inner stanzas for vocal soloists. Bach structured the cantata in five movements and scored it for three vocal soloists, a four-part choir and a Baroque instrumental ensemble of trumpet, two recorders, two oboes, strings and continuo. The outer choral movements use the hymn tune, the first movement in a chorale fantasia, the last one in a four-part setting. In the first movement, Bach quoted two other chorales, "Christe, du Lamm Gottes" as an instrumental cantus firmus and "O Haupt voll Blut und Wunden" repeatedly in the continuo. The third movement features unusual scoring for an obbligato oboe and pizzicato strings, illustrating deathbells. The fourth movement is an unusual form of arioso recitave alternating with aria; a trumpet sounds, representing the Last Judgement. The music of the cantata has been seen as close to Bach's Passion, the St John Passion, to be performed in a second version on Good Friday 1725, and even as a precursor of elements of the St Matthew Passion.

== History, hymn and words ==
Bach held the position of Thomaskantor (director of church music) in Leipzig from 1723. During his first year, beginning with the first Sunday after Trinity, he wrote a cycle of cantatas for the occasions of the liturgical year. In his second year he composed a second annual cycle of cantatas, which was planned to consist exclusively of chorale cantatas, each based on one Lutheran hymn.

Bach composed the chorale cantata Herr Jesu Christ, wahr' Mensch und Gott for Estomihi (Quinquagesima), the last Sunday before Lent, a period when Leipzig observed tempus clausum and no cantatas were performed. In 1723, Bach had probably performed two cantatas in Leipzig for the same occasion, Du wahrer Gott und Davids Sohn, BWV 23, composed earlier in Köthen, and Jesus nahm zu sich die Zwölfe, BWV 22, both audition pieces to apply for the post of Thomaskantor in Leipzig.

The prescribed readings for the Sunday were taken from the First Epistle to the Corinthians, "praise of love" (1 Corinthians 13:1–13), and from the Gospel of Luke, healing the blind near Jericho (Luke 18:31–43). The Gospel also announces the Passion. The text is based on the funeral song "Herr Jesu Christ, wahr Mensch und Gott" in eight stanzas by Paul Eber (1562). The hymn suites the Gospel, stressing the Passion as well as the request of the blind man in the final line of the first stanza: "Du wollst mir Sünder gnädig sein" (Be merciful to me, a sinner). The song further sees Jesus' path to Jerusalem as a model for the believer's path to his end in salvation. An unknown librettist retained the first and the last stanza unchanged and paraphrased the inner stanzas in a sequence of recitatives and arias. Stanzas 2 and 3 were transformed to a recitative, stanza 4 to an aria, and stanzas 5 to 7 to recitative and aria in one movement.

Bach led the Thomanerchor in the first performance of the cantata on 11 February 1725. It is the second to last chorale cantata of his second annual cycle, the only later one being Wie schön leuchtet der Morgenstern, BWV 1, for the feast of Annunciation which was celebrated even if it fell in the time of Lent. No later performance of the cantata is documented during Bach's lifetime, but the first movement became, slightly changed, part of a Passion pasticcio performed by Johann Christoph Altnickol, Bach’s son-in-law, in Naumburg around 1756.

== Music ==
=== Structure and scoring ===
Bach structured the cantata in five movements. In the typical format of Bach's chorale cantatas, the outer movements are set for choir and use the hymn tune, as a chorale fantasia and a closing chorale. The music is richly scored for three vocal soloists (soprano (S), tenor (T) and bass (B)), a four-part choir, and a Baroque instrumental ensemble of trumpet (Tr), two recorders (Fl), two oboes (Ob), two violin parts (Vl), a viola part (Va), and basso continuo. The title of the original parts reads: "Dominica Esto mihi / Herr Jesu Christ / wahr Mensch u. Gott. / à / 4 Voci. / 1 Tromba | 2 Flauti | 2 Hautbois | 2 Violini | Viola | e | Continuo | di | J: S: Bach." The duration has been given as 21 minutes.

In the following table of the movements, the scoring follows the Neue Bach-Ausgabe. The keys and time signatures are taken from Alfred Dürr's standard work Die Kantaten von Johann Sebastian Bach, using the symbol for common time (4/4). The instruments are shown separately for winds and strings, while the continuo, playing throughout, is not shown. As the trumpet part of the first performance is lost, it remains unclear if the trumpet also played, reinforcing the hymn tune, in the outer movements.

Movements of Herr Jesu Christ, wahr' Mensch und Gott
No.	Title	Text	Type	Vocal	Winds	Strings	Key	Time
1	Herr Jesu Christ, wahr' Mensch und Gott	Eber	Chorale fantasia	SATB	(Tr) 2Fl 2Ob	2Vl Va	F major	common time
2	Wenn alles sich zur letzten Zeit entsetzet	anon.	Recitative	T				common time
3	Die Seele ruht in Jesu Händen	anon.	Aria	S	2Fl Ob	2Vl Va	C minor	common time
4	Wenn einstens die Posaunen schallen Fürwahr, fürwahr, euch sage ich	anon.	Recitative and aria	B	Tr	2Vl Va	C major	common time
5	Ach, Herr, vergib all unsre Schuld	Eber	Chorale	SATB	(Tr) 2Fl 2Ob	2Vl Va	F major	common time

=== Movements ===
==== 1 ====
The opening chorale, "Herr Jesu Christ, wahr' Mensch und Gott, der du litt'st Marter, Angst und Spott" (Lord Jesus Christ, true Man and God, you who suffered martyrdom, anguish and ridicule), is structured by an extended introduction and interludes. They are built on a concertante motif derived from the first line of the chorale, but also feature a cantus firmus of the chorale "Christe, du Lamm Gottes", the Lutheran Agnus Dei, first played by the strings, later also by the oboes and recorders. It appears in a way similar to the chorale as the cantus firmus in the opening chorus of his later St Matthew Passion, "O Lamm Gottes, unschuldig". Its request "erbarm dich unser" (have mercy upon us) corresponds to the request of the blind man. A third chorale is quoted repeatedly in the continuo, "O Haupt voll Blut und Wunden". In the recording by John Eliot Gardiner during the Bach Cantata Pilgrimage in 2000, a second choir performed the "Christe, du Lamm Gottes".

On Good Friday that year Bach would perform the second version of his St John Passion, replacing the opening and the closing movement of the first version by music based on chorales, "O Mensch, bewein dein Sünde groß" which would become the final movement of the first part of the St Matthew Passion, and again "Christe, du Lamm Gottes".

==== 2 ====
The second movement, "Wenn alles sich zur letzten Zeit entsetzet" (When everything shudders at the last hour), is sung by the tenor as a secco recitative, imagining the hour of death and connecting it to Jesus on his "journey towards his crucifixion".

==== 3 ====
The first aria, "Die Seele ruht in Jesu Händen, wenn Erde diesen Leib bedeckt" (The soul rests in Jesus’ hands, when earth covers this body), is sung by the soprano. Bach chose a rare instrumentation: the oboe plays a melody, supported by short chords in the recorders, and in the middle section Sterbeglocken (funeral bells) are depicted by pizzicato string sounds.

==== 4 ====
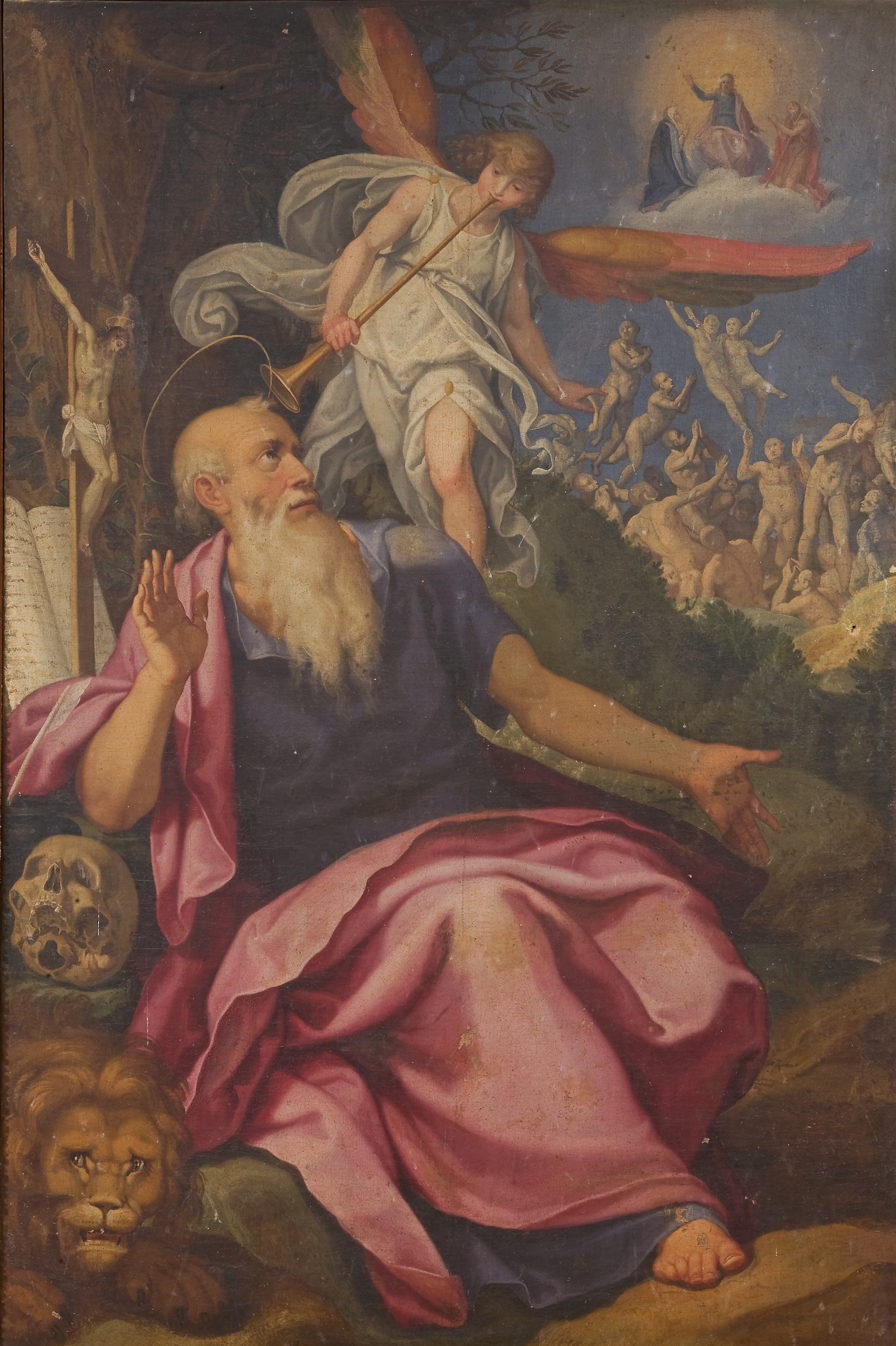
S. Gerome and the trumpet of the last Judgement, oil painting by Pasquale Catti

The fourth movement illustrates the Day of Judgement. On the text "Wenn einstens die Posaunen schallen" (When one day the trumpets ring out), the trumpet enters. The unusual movement combines an accompagnato recitative with an aria, contrasting the destruction of heaven and earth with the security of the believers, the latter given in text and tune from the chorale. When lines of text are quotations from the hymn, Bach also uses the corresponding tune. Gardiner described it as a "grand, tableau-like evocation of the Last Judgement, replete with triple occurrences of a wild 6/8 section when all hell is let loose in true Monteverdian concitato ("excited") manner". He compared it to the "spectacular double chorus" from the St Matthew Passion, Sind Blitze, sind Donner in Wolken verschwunden.

==== 5 ====
The closing chorale, "Ach, Herr, vergib all unsre Schuld" (Ah, Lord, forgive all our misdeeds), is a four-part setting with attention to details of the text, such as movement in the lower voices on "auch unser Glaub stets wacker sei" (also may our faith be always brave) and colourful harmonies on the final line "bis wir einschlafen seliglich" (until we fall asleep contentedly).

== BWV 127/1 (variant) ==
A reworked and transposed version of the cantata's opening movement opens the second part of the Passion pasticcio Wer ist der, so von Edom kömmt. This version of the cantata's opening movement is known as BWV 127/1 (variant), or BC D 10/1.

== Manuscripts and publication ==
After Bach's death, the material for the chorale cantatas was generally split between his widow Anna Magdalena Bach, who inherited the parts, and his son Wilhelm Friedemann Bach, who received the autograph scores and duplicate parts. Bach's widow passed the parts to the city of Leipzig, which held them in the library of the Thomanerchor. The score and duplicate parts are held by the Berlin State Library. The score and the parts are extant with the exception of the trumpet part.

The cantata was first published in 1878 in the first complete edition of Bach's work, the Bach-Gesellschaft Ausgabe. The volume in which the cantata appeared was edited by Alfred Dörffel. In 1992, the cantata was published in the Neue Bach-Ausgabe, the second complete edition of Bach's works, where it was edited by Christoph Wolff.

== Recordings ==
The selection is taken from the listing on the Bach Cantatas Website. Instrumental groups playing period instruments in historically informed performances are highlighted in green under the heading "Instr.".

Recordings of Herr Jesu Christ, wahr' Mensch und Gott
Title	Conductor / Choir / Orchestra	Soloists	Label	Year	Instr.
J. S. Bach: Cantatas BWV 67, 108 & 127	Karl Richter Münchener Bach-Chor Bayerisches Staatsorchester	Antonia Fahberg; Peter Pears; Kieth Engen	Teldec	1958	
J. S. Bach: Cantatas BWV 127 & BWV 171	Wolfgang Gönnenwein Süddeutscher Madrigalchor South West German Chamber Orchestra	Herrad Wehrung; Georg Jelden; Jakob Stämpfli	Cantata	1961	
Die Bach Kantate Vol. 40	Helmuth Rilling Gächinger Kantorei Bach-Collegium Stuttgart	Arleen Augér; Lutz-Michael Harder; Wolfgang Schöne	Hänssler	1980	
J. S. Bach: Das Kantatenwerk • Complete Cantatas • Les Cantates, Folge / Vol. 31	Gustav Leonhardt: Knabenchor Hannover; Collegium Vocale Gent; Tölzer Knabenchor; Leonhardt-Consort	soloist of the Knabenchor Hannover; Kurt Equiluz; Max van Egmond	Teldec	1982	Period
J. S. Bach: "Mit Fried und Freud"	Philippe Herreweghe Collegium Vocale Gent	Ingeborg Danz; Mark Padmore; Peter Kooy	Harmonia Mundi France	1998	Period
J. S. Bach: Complete Cantatas Vol. 11	Ton Koopman Amsterdam Baroque Orchestra & Choir	Sibylla Rubens; Christoph Prégardien; Klaus Mertens	Antoine Marchand	1999	Period
Bach Cantatas Vol. 21: Cambridge/Walpole St Peter / For Quinquagesima Sunday (Estomihi) / For Annunciation / Palm Sunday / Oculi	John Eliot Gardiner: Monteverdi Choir; Choir of Clare College, Cambridge; Choir of Trinity College, Cambridge; English Baroque Soloists	Ruth Holton; James Oxley; Stephan Loges	Soli Deo Gloria	2000	Period
Bach Edition Vol. 20 – Cantatas Vol. 11	Pieter Jan Leusink Holland Boys Choir Netherlands Bach Collegium	Ruth Holton; Nico van der Meel; Bas Ramselaar	Brilliant Classics	2000	Period
Johann Sebastian Bach / Cantatas: Volume 34 (Cantatas from Leipzig, 1725)	Masaaki Suzuki Bach Collegium Japan	Carolyn Sampson; Gerd Türk; Peter Kooy	BIS	2005	Period
J. S. Bach: Jesus, deine Passion – Cantates BWV 22, 23, 127 & 159	Philippe Herreweghe Collegium Vocale Gent	Dorothee Mields; Jan Kobow; Peter Kooy	Harmonia Mundi France	2007	Period
