= Pre-Lent =

Start of the preparation time for Easter

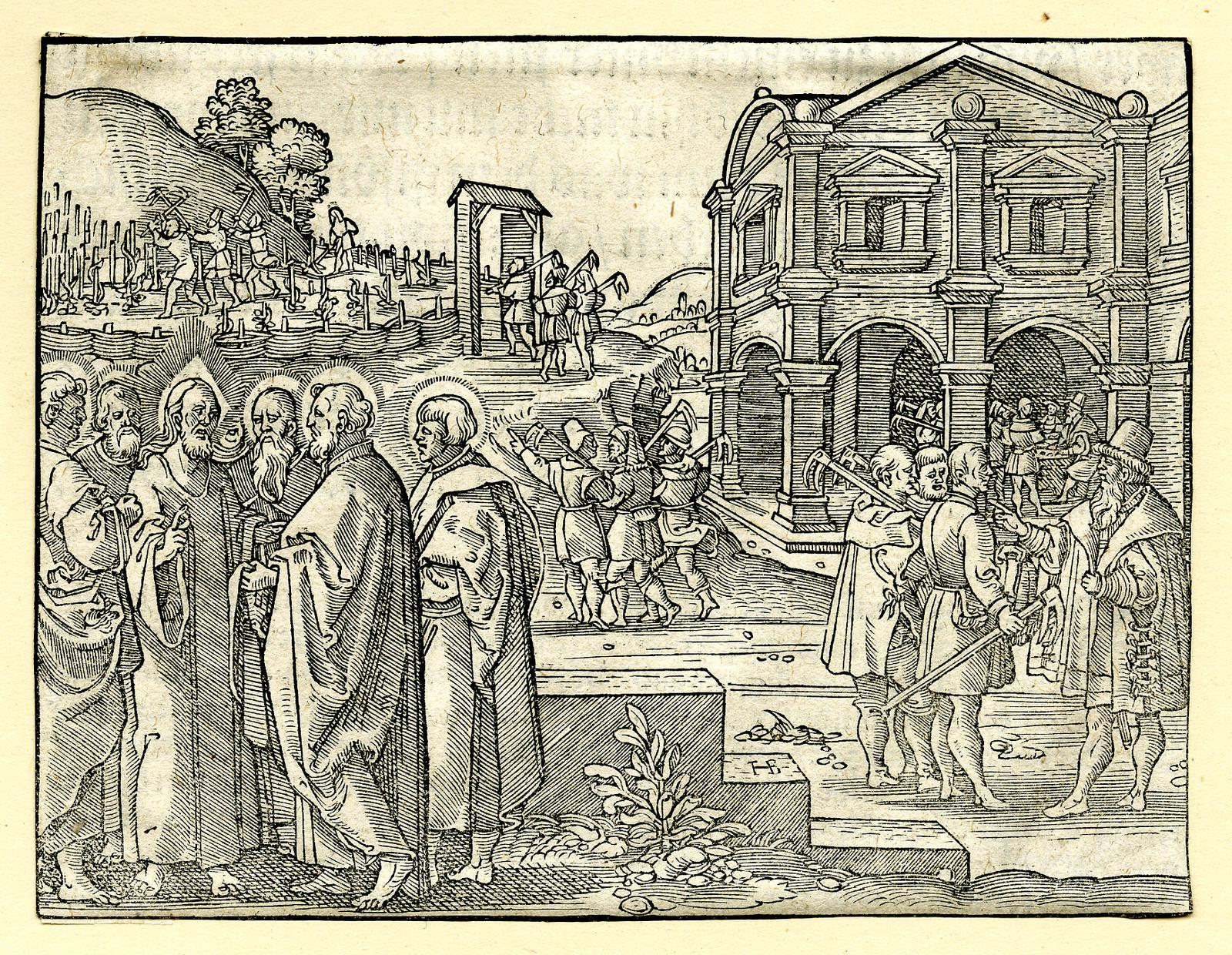
- The Parable of the Workers in the Vineyard: print for Septuagesima
- Celebrations: Carnival; Omission of Alleluia
- Observances: Catechesis
- Begins: On Septuagesima (Western); On Sunday Of The Publican And Pharisee (Eastern)
- Ends: On Shrove Tuesday (Western); On Sunday of Forgiveness (Eastern)
- Date: Variable (follows the paschal computus)
- 2025 date: 16 February – 4 March (Western); 9 February – 2 March (Eastern)
- 2026 date: 1 February – 17 February (Western); 1 February – 22 February (Eastern)
- 2027 date: 24 January – 9 February (Western); 21 February – 14 March (Eastern)
- Duration: 2.5 weeks
- Frequency: Annual (lunar calendar)
- Related to: Lent, Great Lent, Holy Week, Easter

Pre-Lent begins the Christian time of preparation for Easter, in the three weeks before Lent. This period launches a campaign of catechesis, reflected in the liturgical readings. Its best-known feature is its concluding three-day festival, Carnival or Shrovetide.

== Western Churches ==
The pre-Lenten period begins with Septuagesima, first documented in Gregory the Great. It traditionally opens a period of religious instruction leading to the reception of catechumens at Easter, supported by events such as mystery plays. The traditional lectionary for the canonical hours summarizes salvation history between Septuagesima and Easter, beginning with a reading of the Book of Genesis. The last three days of pre-Lent are known as Carnival, Shrovetide, or Fastelavn, a festival ending with Shrove Tuesday or Mardi Gras.

The liturgy of the period is characterized by violet vestments (except on feasts) and a more penitential mood. From Septuagesima, Alleluia is not traditionally sung in worship. A sermon of Hildebert explains the logic of this practice:

Moreover this day, which is, as it were, the gate of the fast, and takes away from us the song of joy, that is, Alleluia, shows our state of penitence and sorrow, teaching us that we ought to cease from immoderate joy, and remain in tears of repentance. We therefore repeat the hymn again and again, and address Alleluia itself, desirous of retaining it as a guest, and saying to it, Abide with us, for the day is far spent; and we then give it our last farewell, saying, The good angel of the Lord accompany you, that you may return again to us; that we may know that we shall not have perfect joy, until, renewed by the Body and Blood of our Redeemer, we receive that song with gladness.

A custom developed during the Middle Ages of children burying an Alleluia on Septuagesima Eve. It is possible for Candlemas (2 February) to fall after Septuagesima Sunday, creating occasional musical challenges.

The pre-Lenten period includes three Sundays, whose names refer to the approximate periods of seventy, sixty, and fifty days before Easter. The Sundays are also known by the opening word of the introit for the day:

- Septuagesima or Circumdederunt (from Circumdederunt me gemitus mortis, Psalm 18:5), centred on the Parable of the Workers in the Vineyard (Matthew 20:1–16), already used for this Sunday in the time of Gregory the Great
- Sexagesima or Exsurge (from Exsurge quare obdormis Domine, Psalm 44:24), featuring the Parable of the Sower (Luke 8:4–15)
- Quinquagesima or Estomihi (from Esto mihi in Deum protectorem, Psalm 31:3), with the story of Jesus healing the blind near Jericho (Luke 18:31–43)

While Lutheran and Anglican liturgies continue to mark a pre-Lenten period, the Roman Rite after 1970 eliminated Septuagesima, Sexagesima, and Quinquagesima. The preconciliar rites after the Second Vatican Council also continue to mark these seventeen days. The Revised Common Lectionary does not associate particular readings with the Sundays before Lent, but some users of this lectionary, such as the Church of England, have retrofitted a pre-Lenten provision.

== Eastern Churches ==
In the Eastern Orthodox and Byzantine Catholic churches, the pre-Lenten period lasts three weeks. It begins on the Sunday of the Publican and the Pharisee and continues through the Sunday of Forgiveness, the day before the beginning of Great Lent. Since the liturgical day begins at sunset, and Great Lent begins on a Monday, the point at which Great Lent begins is at Vespers on the night of the Sunday of Forgiveness, with a feast of mutual forgiveness. In some monasteries, this ceremony is performed at Compline instead of Vespers.

Thus begins the first day of the Great Fast, which is known as Clean Monday. The weeks of pre-Lent and Great Lent are anticipatory and preparatory by nature. They begin on Monday and end on Sunday, each week being named for the theme of the upcoming Sunday. The hymns used during the pre-Lenten and Lenten seasons are taken from a book called the Triodion.

The weeks of the pre-Lenten Season break are:

- Zacchaeus Sunday (Slavic tradition) is sometimes regarded as a pre-Lenten Sunday because of its place in the Slavic lectionary. In that tradition, it is the eleventh Sunday before Pascha (Easter). There are no hymns proper to this Sunday. Its only distinguishing feature is the reading of Luke 19:1-10, the Gospel concerning Zacchaeus. This lectionary reading is sometimes also appointed on the same Sunday in the Byzantine ("Greek") lectionary, as well. The week following this Sunday is a normal, non-Lenten time, since it falls outside the Triodion.
- The Publican and the Pharisee: Tenth Sunday before Pascha (70 days). The week following this Sunday is a fast-free week, lest the faithful be tempted, like the Pharisee to boast about fasting.
- The Prodigal Son: Ninth Sunday before Pascha (63 days). The week following this Sunday is the last during which the laity may eat meat or meat products. The fasting rules for this week are the same as those for non-Lenten periods.
- The Last Judgment or Meat-Fare Sunday (the last day meat may be eaten): Eighth Sunday before Pascha (56 days). The week following this Sunday is called Cheese-Fare Week and is a fast-free week, with the exception that meat and meat products are forbidden.
- Sunday of Forgiveness or Cheese-Fare Sunday: Seventh Sunday before Pascha (49 days). This Sunday is the last day dairy products may be consumed. Throughout Great Lent, fish, wine, and olive oil will be allowed only on certain days.
