= Alleluia piis edite laudibus =

Alleluia piis edite laudibus (Alleluia to the pious praises), also known as Alleluia perenne (Alleluia forever), is a medieval Latin hymn sung during the week before Septuagesima as a preparation for the dismissal of "Alleluia" during Lent.

== History ==
The hymn originates in the Mozarabic rite. The words are found in the Mozarabic Breviary, in which it is said to be an office hymn for first vespers, second vespers, and lauds on the first Sunday in Lent and the Saturday preceding. John Julian, in A Dictionary of Hymnology, notes that the hymn cannot be dated to later than the 8th century, at which time hymns were no longer admitted. John Mason Neale, in Mediæval Hymns and Sequences, notes that theme of the hymn, that "Alleluia" is perpetually sung in heaven, is echoed in the capitula, the benediction, and the lauda of the liturgy for the day.

The hymn was translated into English as Sing Alleluia forth in duteous praise by John Ellerton.

== Melody ==
Various melodies are currently in use. Hymn tunes include Alleluia perenne by William Henry Monk, Endless Alleluia by Joseph Barnby, Martins by Percy Carter Buck, and Piepkorn by Robert Buckley Farlee.

== Lyrics ==
The hymn establishes the perpetuity of the alleluia in heaven, underscoring the hope of its gladsome return, and the security that there the Church never ceases to sing "Alleluia" throughout the year. It is in contrast with the hymn Alleluia, dulce carmen, which acknowledges that the "Alleluia" is sung perpetually in heaven, yet laments that during our earthly exile, we must put away the "Alleluia" for a time, as we repent of our sins during the season of Lent.

Here is the lyric translation by English church musician William Henry Monk:

Alleluia piis edite laudibus,
Cives ætherei, psallite unanimiter
Alleluia perenne.

Hinc vos perpetui luminis accolæ
Ad summum resonate hymniferis choris
Alleluia perenne.

Vos Urbs eximia suscipiet Dei,
Quæ lætis resonans cantibus, excitat
Alleluia perenne.

Felici reditu gaudia sumite,
Reddentes Domino glorificum melos,
Alleluia perenne.

Almum sidereæ iam Patriæ decus
Victores capite, quo canere possitis
Alleluia perenne.

Illic Regis honor vocibus inclitis
Iocundum reboat carmine perpetim
Alleluia perenne.

Hoc fessis requies, hoc cibus, hoc potus
Oblectans reduces, haustibus affluens
Alleluia perenne.

Te suavisonis conditor affatim
Rerum carminibus, laudeque pangimus
Alleluia perenne.

Te Christe celebrat gloria vocibus
Nostris omnipotens, ac tibi dicimus:
Alleluia perenne:
Alleluia perenne. Amen.

Sing Alleluia forth in duteous praise,
O citizens of heaven, and sweetly raise
An endless Alleluia.

Ye next, who stand before th' Eternal light,
In hymning choirs re-echo to the Height
An endless Alleluia.

The Holy City shall take up your strain,
And with glad songs resounding wake again
An endless Alleluia.

In blissful antiphons ye thus rejoice
To render to the Lord with thankful voice
An endless Alleluia.

Ye who have gained at length your palms in bliss,
Victorious ones, your chant shall still be this,
An endless Alleluia.

There, in one grand acclaim for ever ring
The strains which tell the honour of your King,
An endless Alleluia.

This is the rest for weary ones brought back;
This is glad food and drink which none shall lack,--
An endless Alleluia.

While Thee, by whom were all things made, we praise
For ever, and tell out in sweetest lays
An endless Alleluia.

Almighty Christ, to Thee our voices sing
Glory for evermore; to Thee we bring
An endless Alleluia.
