= Quadragesima =

Quadragesima may refer to:

- Lent, the Christian period of fasting, prayer and almsgiving
- Quadragesima Sunday
