= Weimarer Passion =

The Weimarer Passion, BWV deest (BC D 1), is a hypothetical Passion oratorio by Johann Sebastian Bach, thought to have possibly been performed on Good Friday 26 March 1717 at Gotha on the basis of a payment of 12 Thaler on 12 April 1717 to "Concert Meister Bachen". It is one of several such lost Passions. Both the text (by an unknown librettist) and music are lost, but individual movements from this work could have been reused in latter works such as the Johannes-Passion. At one time, it was thought that the work set chapters 26 and 27 of the Gospel of Matthew to music, with interspersed chorales and arias, but current consensus is that it is possible that the text reflected a synopsis of two or more Gospel texts, as well as the interspersed chorales and arias.

== Background ==
Of the five Passion settings Carl Philipp Emanuel Bach and Sebastian's former pupil Johann Friedrich Agricola mention in Bach's obituary only two have survived with any degree of certainty: the St John Passion and the St Matthew Passion. A third is documented in the form of a libretto dating from 1731 (published 1732) and a newly discovered libretto dating from 1744 (found in the National Library in St. Petersburg [Catalogue No. 17,139.1.423]). A fourth Passion is evident in the form of a manuscript copy by Bach and his son Carl Philipp Emanuel dating from c. 1730 (with an addition recently discovered in Bach's hand dating from c. 1745/1746) of an anonymous St Luke Passion that originally was attributed to Bach (BWV 246 [BC D 6]), but has now been attributed to a yet-unknown master who was active in Thuringia in the early 18th century (possibly ending in ca. 1717). The attribution to Johann Melchior Molter has been rejected based on the fact that some of the material in the manuscript was done in Carl Philipp Emanuel's hand, who left Leipzig in 1734 for Frankfurt an der Oder).

Much speculation has been made over the identity of the fifth Passion setting. Theories have ranged from a one-choir setting of the St Matthew Passion ("Eine Paßion nach dem Matthäus, incomplet" was listed in the "Verzeichniß des musikalischen Nachlasses des verstorbenen Capellmeisters Carl Philipp Emanuel Bach" (1714–1788) published by Gortlieb Friedrich Schniebes in Hamburg in 1790). Others have speculated that the Weimarer Passion was the fifth Passion setting discussed in the obituary. Others have speculated that this Passion setting not really an Oratorio Passion at all, but rather a Passion Oratorio setting of a text by Christian Friedrich Henrici entitled "Erbauliche Gedanken auf den Gruenen Donnerstag und Charfreitag ueber den Leidenden Jesum" (a part of his 1725 text cycle Sammlung erbaulicher Gedancken über und auf die gewöhnlichen Sonn- und Festtage).

== Bach in 1717 ==
The year 1717 proved to be a pivotal one in the life and career of Bach, then Court Organist and Concertmaster to the main Court of William Ernest, Duke of Saxe-Weimar. That year, he gained some notoriety outside the region where he lived and worked, in the modern state of Thuringia. Johann Mattheson, a diplomat, musician, music theoretician, and Kantor (director of church musicI at the old St. Mary's Cathedral in Hamburg, published his treatise about music and musicians, Das Beschützte Orchestre, oder desselben Zweyte Eröffnung: Worinn Nicht nur einem würcklichen galant-homme ... sondern auch manchem Musico selbst die alleraufrichtigste und deutlichste Vorstellung musicalischer Wissenschaften .... In Part I, Chapter V, p. 222 of this treatise, Mattheson states "Ich habe von dem berühmten Organisten zu Weimar/hrn. Joh. Sebastian Bach/Sachen gesehen..." ("I have of the organist to Weimar/Mr. Joh. Sebastian Bach/seen things ..."). In this work, he lists famous contemporary and former organists. Thus, for the first time, the name of Johann Sebastian Bach appeared in print. In the autumn of that year, Bach was invited to a keyboard instrument contest in the capital city of the Electorate of Saxony, Dresden, between himself and the French Royal Court Organist and Keyboardist Louis Marchand, who was then towards the end of a long concert tour of the Holy Roman Empire. When Bach arrived, however, he learned that his rival had left the night before, thus aborting the contest and by default acknowledging his inferiority to Bach's skills.

Back at Weimar, his employment situation became more complicated. In 1716, his co-employer Ernest Augustus I, Duke of Saxe-Weimar-Eisenach had married Princess Eleonore Wilhelmine of Anhalt-Köthen (an event that Bach probably participated in and for which he provided music). The new duchess's brother (Leopold, Prince of Anhalt-Köthen) may also have attended the event. If that is the case, he would have met Bach then. At any rate, on 5 August 1717, Leopold officially ordered Bach to become his Court Kapellmeister.

Around the same time (1717), the relations between the co-rulers in Weimar became even more strained than they had been previously, to the point that Wilhelm Ernst officially forbade his employees to have any relations or communications with the Ernst August's residence Rotes Schloss. Wilhelm Ernst was also looking for a successor to the post of Kapellmeister at his court because the previous holder of the post, Johann Samuel Drese, had died on 1 December 1716. Eventually Drese's son (a less talented candidate) was selected for the post. Possibly because of this perceived snub, and also because of the perceived better circumstances awaiting him in Köthen both financially and in prestige, Bach began more vehemently to request his release from Wilhelm Ernst. He had become so insistent that between 6 November and 2 December, he was imprisoned before final permission was granted. The court secretary's report of the incident relates as follows:

On November 6, [1717], the quondam concertmaster and organist Bach was confined to the County Judge's place of detention for too stubbornly forcing the issue of his dismissal and finally on December 2 was freed from arrest with notice of his unfavourable discharge.

At any rate, during this flurry of activity, Bach had also received a commission from Frederick II, Duke of Saxe-Gotha-Altenburg to compose and perform a Passion setting for his court for Good Friday, as his then Kapellmeister, Christian Friedrich Witt, was on his deathbed. Bach accepted the commission, and performed the work on 26 March 1717 at the Schloss Friedenstein Chapel. The work performed there was the so-called Weimarer Passion.

== The work ==
The text and music of this Weimarer Passion are lost. In recent research, nine movements from this work have been identified because Bach reused them in different functions. These are as follows:

1. Chorale fantasia on "O Mensch, bewein dein Sünde groß", D major, for SATB choir, flauto traverso I/II, oboe I/II, violino I/II, viola, continuo (incl. liuto and organo)
2. Aria with Chorale "Himmel reiße, Welt erbebe", F-sharp minor, for bass solo, choral soprano, flauto traverso I/II, continuo
3. Aria Zerschmettert mich, ihr Felsen und ihr Hügel, A major, for solo tenor, violino I/II, viola, continuo
4. Aria Ach windet euch nicht so, geplagte Seelen, C minor, for solo tenor, oboe I/II, bassono, continuo
5. Chorale fantasia on "Christe, du Lamm Gottes" G minor (Coro: S A T B, Flauto traverso I/II, Oboe I/II, Violino I/II, Viola, Continuo
6. Chorale "Christus, der uns selig macht", BWV 283 (BC F 31.1), A minor, SATB, flauto traverso I/II, oboe I/II, violino I/II, viola, continuo
7. Aria Erbarme dich!, D minor, for tenor, flauto traverso, continuo
8. Recitativo Erbarme dich!, B♭ major, for tenor, violino I/II, viola, continuo
9. Chorale "Bin ich gleich von dir gewichen", B♭ major, SATB, flauto traverso I/II, oboe I/II, violino I/II, viola, continuo

On 7 February 1723, the fifth movement mentioned above was used again after the sermon as the fourth and final movement of the second trial piece Bach wrote for his application for the post of Cantor of St. Thomas Church, Leipzig and Directoris Chori musici of Leipzig, the cantata Du wahrer Gott und Davids Sohn, BWV 23. For this work (BC A 47b, Bach transposed it to F♯ minor. The work was revived again (with the same setting and key) on 20 February 1724 (Quinquagesima or Estomihi Sunday), this time with brass instruments (Cornetto, Trombone I-III, all colla voce Cornet with Soprano, Trombone I with Alto, Trombone II with Tenor, and Trombone III with Bass (voice type)).

In 1725, Bach revived (possibly a last-minute decision) his St John Passion. It is possible that he had in mind a revival of the Weimarer Passion, but realized that it was impossible, especially since the Leipzig liturgy required a Passion setting in two parts framing the sermon. However, this did not stop Bach from reusing material from the Weimar work in this new Passion setting. Of the nine movements mentioned in the above list, Bach would use five of them in the second version of the St John Passion:

1. Chorale fantasia "O Mensch, bewein dein Sünde groß" E♭ major (Coro: S A T B, Flauto traverso I/II, Oboe I/II, Violino I/II, Viola, Continuo), replacing the 1724 original Movement I ("Herr, unser Herrscher", G minor, Coro: S A T B, Oboe I/II, Violino I/II, Viola, Continuo). Movements 2-11 of 1724 work = Movements 2-11 of 1725 work.
2. Aria with Chorale "Himmel reiße, Welt erbebe" F♯ minor (Solo: B, Coro: S, Flauto traverso I/II, Continuo)--New Movement 12. Movement 12 of 1724 work = Movement 13 of 1725 work. Movement 13 of 1724 work = replaced by movement below.
3. Aria "Zerschmettert mich, ihr Felsen und ihr Hügel" A major (Solo: T, Violino I/II, Viola, Continuo)--New Movement 14 (replacing Movement 13 of 1724 work). Movements 14-19 of 1724 work = Movements 15-20 of 1725 work (Movement 20 of 1724 work left out, Movement 19 of 1724 work replaced by new aria [see below])
4. Aria "Ach windet euch nicht so, geplagte Seelen" C minor (Solo: T, Oboe I/II, Continuo)--New Movement 20 (replacing Movement 19 of 1724 work). Movements 21-40 of 1724 work = Movements 21- 40 of 1725 work, Movement 40 replaced by new Chorale (see below)
5. Chorale fantasia "Christe, du Lamm Gottes" G minor (Coro: S A T B, Flauto traverso I/II, Oboe I/II, Violino I/II, Viola, Continuo)

On 17 November 1726, Bach composed his cantata for the 22nd Sunday after Trinity Sunday, Ich armer Mensch, ich Sündenknecht, BWV 55, for solo tenor, SATB, flauto traverso, oboe, violino I/II, viola, organo and continuo, in G minor. For the final three movements of the work, a sequence of aria, recitative and chorale, Bach employed movements 7 to 9 of the above-mentioned list of movements of the Weimarer Passion. The chorale setting BWV 283, number 6 of the list above, was later included in the collection of chorales that Carl Philipp Emanuel Bach and Johann Philipp Kirnberger compiled and Johann Gottlob Immanuel Breitkopf published between 1784 and 1787 (BWV 253-438).

Between 1728 and 1731, Bach again revived his Quinquagesima cantata Du wahrer Gott und Davids Sohn. This time he set it in C minor and removed the brass parts from the final movements and revised its vocal parts.

Finally, on 29 March 1736, 23 March 1742, and between 1743–1746, Bach revived his St Matthew Passion in a new form. In this version, he replaced the original four-part chorale setting that ends Part I with the chorale fantasia that he used in both the Weimarer Passion and as movement 1 of the 1725 (second) version of the St John Passion. This time, he scored it in E major for 2 choirs, 2 orchestras, 2 organs (and ripieno soprano choir in the 1742 and 1743-6 versions).

== Vocal and instrumental forces ==
The conjectured scoring for the work (based on the scoring of the aforementioned movements that had been reused in other forms) is: tenor and bass soloists, choir SATB, flauto traverso I/II, oboe I/II, violino I/II, viola, basso continuo. There is evidence (in the form of payment records) that the continuo also consisted of one or two lutes. This would therefore be a total of 20 instrumentalists, to which would be added an organist and harpsichordist. Bach would probably be the harpsichordist, as according to the surviving information we have about his conducting position, he often conducted from the harpsichord. However, it is possible that Bach could have led the ensemble from the violin, as with other performances from the Weimar period. For Passion music, there would be no trumpets and timpani. The vocal forces would require 12-16 singers (3-4 per part)
