= Three Sundays of Commemoration =

Three consecutive Sundays before Lent

- Observed by: Maronite Church
- Liturgical color: Black, where it is tradition (otherwise violet or purple)
- Type: Christian
- Significance: For the souls of all the faithful departed
- Observances: Prayer for the departed, visits to cemeteries, decking of graves, special pastries and food, farewell to meat
- Date: Three Sundays before Ash Monday
- Duration: 3 weeks
- Frequency: annual
- Related to: Pre-Lent

The Three Sundays of Commemoration are three consecutive Sundays before Lent during which the Maronite Rite remembers the departed. It does not replace but supplement the commemoration of Feast of All Saints and the Commemoration of the Faithful Departed in November.

== Background: the notion of pre-Lent ==
In all the ancient Christian liturgies, there is a preparatory period for the great fast of Lent, during which the faithful are warned of the arrival of this major period of the liturgical year, so that they can gradually begin the exercises of asceticism. who will accompany them until Easter. This preparatory period for Lent generally lasts 3 weeks in most rites. These Sundays correspond to Septuagesima, Sexagesima and Quinquagesima in the Roman rite. These designations come from the counting system used in antiquity and designate the decade in which each of these Sundays falls. They precede the first Sunday of Lent (Quadragesima). The memory of human frailty, the meditation on the last ends and consequently the prayers for the dead are recurring elements of this liturgical period. The Churches of Syriac and Coptic traditions have preserved an older state comprising shorter periods of fasting, the fast of the Ninevites and the fast of Heraclius, from which probably formed the pre-Lenten period of the other rites. like the Maronite rite.

== History ==
The Three Sundays of Commemoration are an ancient tradition which can be traced to the triple commemoration of the dead in the Byzantine tradition attested since the Apostolic Constitutions in the 4th century.

In the Jacobite Syriac Pre-Lent, there are Three Fridays of Commemoration with a specific layout: fasting of the Ninevites (Sawmo d'ninwoyé - Monday to Wednesday of Septuagesima), Sunday of the deceased priests (Kohné – Sexagesima), Sunday of the faithful deceased ('Aneedé – Quinquagesima).

Among the Maronites, the three Sundays before Lent are devoted to the memory of the dead: the Sunday of deceased priests (Septuagesima), the Sunday of the Righteous and Righteous (Sexagesima), the Sunday of the faithful departed (Quinquagesima). It is most likely that they evolved from the three consecutive Fridays of commemoration of the faithful departed in the Syriac liturgy.

Despite the long attachment of the Maronite Church to Rome, Maronites have kept their own rite and traditions, especially around the Lenten season, and its preparation, something with which the papacy has never interfered.

The Second Vatican Council did not interfere with this celebration; instead, it encouraged to respect as an authentic Maronite tradition.

== Rite ==
The three Sundays of Commemoration are a gradual entry into Lent, allowing for gradual asceticism and spiritual preparation. The three Sundays put an end to the season of the Epiphany as can be seen from the change of response in the Qadishat and wear different liturgical colours from white and gold to purple and black.

=== Sunday of the Deceased Priests ===
The first Sunday of Commemoration in the Maronite rite rejoins the Chaldean version in commemorating the different ranks of the hierarchical Church.

It is a day on which the Maronite faithful remember their past pastors, and priest themselves, as most of the Maronite clergy is married, also remember their own fathers; thus, for example, Youakim Moubarac wrote a memorial to his grandfather and priestly model on that day.

In the week that follows, the daily readings provided by the Maronite liturgy are a continuous reading of the Second epistle of Saint Paul to Timothy, which is a reminder of the advice of the deceased pastors to the surviving Christians which relate like Paul and Timothy.

=== Sunday of the Righteous ===
On the Sunday of the Righteous, the Maronites ask for the intercession of the saints who have preceded them in the Kingdom of Heaven. It is also known as the Sunday of prayer for the righteous and the monks or Sunday of the deceased religious.

The Sunday of the Righteous is an ancient tradition of the Eastern rites. However, it used to be celebrated during the time of Avent around December 6, as a time of prayer for the Righteous of the Mosaic covenant. During this ancient liturgy, the Apocalypse of Baruch was read. This Sunday of the Righteous is also still celebrated in December by Ethiopian Christians.

After the Sunday of the Righteous, masses are offered daily until Lent in suffrage for the deceased ('ala nafs mawtaina).

=== Sunday of the Faithful Departed ===
On the Sunday of the Faithful Departed, the Maronites pray for those faithful who are in Purgatory. According to Reverend Anthony J. Salim, "these commemorations of the Departed are to be seen in the context of the Epiphany emphasis on the charismational mission of all Christians, and on the destiny of those faithful to their baptismal calling. Those who have died to this life are on the next stage of their journey to the Kingdom."

After the Sunday of the faithful departed, a final meal of zafra brings together the family. It is the meal announcing the departure of all food of animal origin or zafra, that is to say red meat. The next day, no trace of zafra should be found in the house. To complete this purification, the house is washed, thus preparing it for a period of piety, which begins on Ash Monday, the first day of fasting.

== Iconography ==
The Three Sundays of Commemoration have been written in three different icons by iconographist and Maronite priest Abdo Badawi.
