= Antonia Fahberg =

Austrian opera singer

- Born: 19 May 1928; Vienna
- Died: 21 October 2016 (aged 88); Munich
- Education: Wiener Musikakademie
- Occupation: Operatic soprano
- Organizations: Bavarian State Opera

Antonia Fahberg (also: Antonie; 19 May 1928 in Vienna, Austria – 21 October 2016 in Munich, Germany) was an Austrian lyric soprano in opera and concert. Her career focused on the Bavarian State Opera where she sang for 25 years. She performed regularly in concerts and recordings with Karl Richter and the Münchener Bach-Chor, and appeared at major opera houses and festivals in Europe.

== Career ==
Born in Vienna, Fahberg studied voice at the Wiener Musikakademie. She made her debut in 1950 at the Landestheater Innsbruck. From 1952 she was a member of Bavarian State Opera, where she performed for 25 years. She appeared at major European opera houses as a guest, such as Amsterdam, Brussels, Hamburg and Vienna. She performed at the Salzburg Festival in concert in 1963 and 1964. She was a regular singer at the Munich Opernfestspiele, in concert and oratorio, and in TV shows.

She recorded in 1956 in Saint-Eustache in Paris Bach's Magnificat with the choirs of Philippe Caillard and the Pro Arte Orchestra, conducted by Kurt Redel. In 1964 she was the soprano soloist of Helmuth Rilling's first recording of Bach's cantata Ein feste Burg ist unser Gott, BWV 80, with the Figuralchor der Gedächtniskirche Stuttgart and the Württembergisches Kammerorchester Heilbronn.

Fahberg was one of the soloists for concerts and recordings of Karl Richter and the Münchener Bach-Chor. In a typical cantata concert, she performed on 26 April 1959 in two of four Bach cantatas: Christ lag in Todes Banden, BWV 4, and Also hat Gott die Welt geliebt, BWV 68. She was the soprano soloist in Bach's Mass in B minor, performed for the 9th Protestant Kirchentag in Munich in 1959, alongside Hertha Töpper, and John van Kesteren and Kieth Engen. In November 1960 she appeared in Mozart's Requiem.

She recorded with Richter cantatas, and his first recordings of both the Mass in B minor (1956) and the St Matthew Passion (1958). A reviewer noted her performance as a highlight of cantata Herr Jesu Christ, wahr' Mensch und Gott, BWV 127, calling it "a beguiling and beautifully restrained performance".

Fahberg died in Munich.
