= Paul Eber =

German Lutheran theologian (1511–1569)

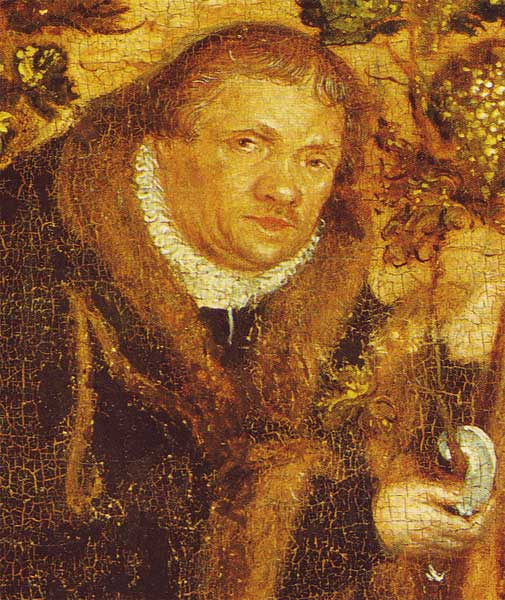
- Eber, portrayed by Lucas Cranach the Younger
- Born: 8 November 1511; Kitzingen, Margraviate of Brandenburg-Ansbach, Holy Roman Empire of the German Nation
- Died: 10 December 1569 (aged 58); Wittenberg, Electorate of Saxony, Holy Roman Empire of the German Nation
- Education: University of Wittenberg
- Occupations: Lutheran theologian; Hymnwriter; Academic teacher
- Organizations: University of Wittenberg

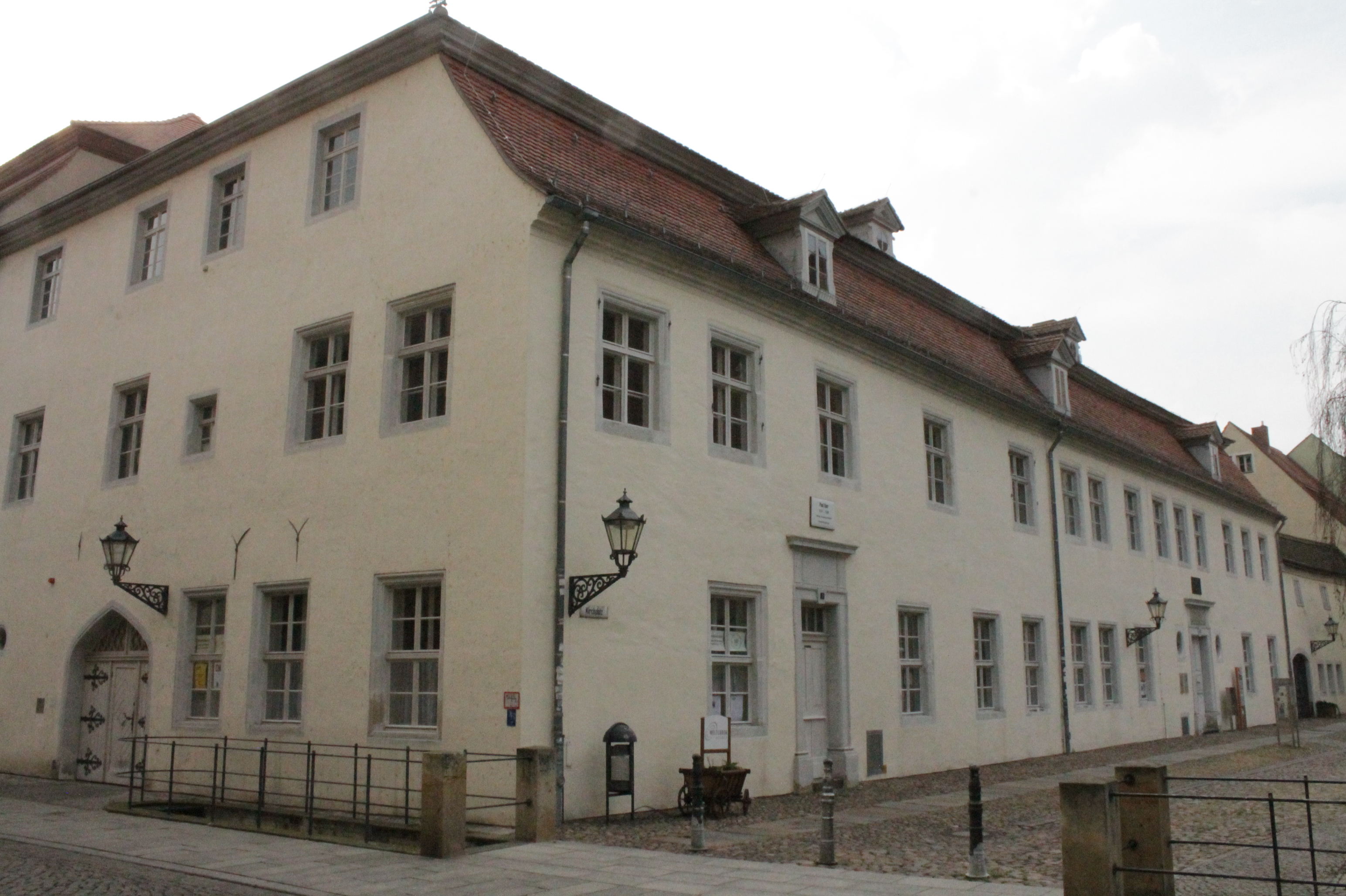
Paul Eber's House, Kirchplatz, Wittenberg

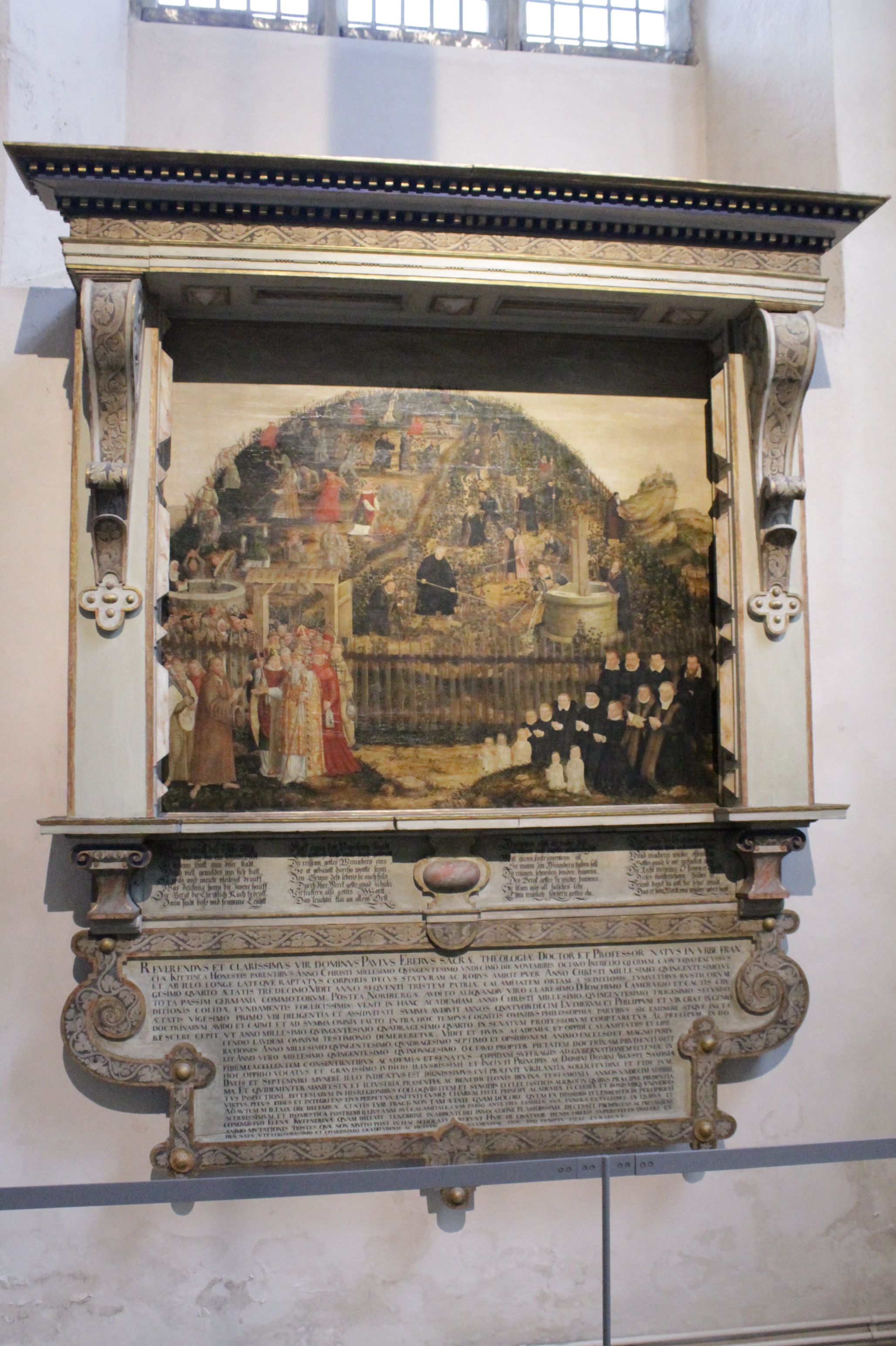
The grave of Paul Eber, Stadtkirche Wittenberg

Paul Eber (8 November 1511 – 10 December 1569) was a German Lutheran theologian, reformer and hymnwriter, known for the hymn for the dying, "Herr Jesu Christ, wahr Mensch und Gott".

== Life ==
He was born at Kitzingen in Franconia, and was educated at Nuremberg then Wittenberg, where he became the close friend of Philipp Melanchthon. In 1541 he was appointed professor of Latin grammar at Wittenberg, and in 1557 professor of the Old Testament at Wittenberg University. His range of learning was wide, and he published a handbook of Jewish history, a historical calendar intended to supersede the Roman Saints' Calendar, and a revision of the Latin Old Testament.

He was an effective preacher and faithful collaborator of Melanchthon. A proponent of a mild Lutheran doctrine, he played an important role in the theological conflicts of the time, trying to mediate between the extreme tendencies, particularly between the Gnesio-Lutherans and the Crypto-Calvinists.

From 1559 to the close of his life he was superintendent general of the electorate of Saxony. He attained some fame as a hymn writer, his best-known composition being Wenn wir in höchsten Nöten sein.

In Wittenberg he lived on the north east corner of Kirchplatz/Judenstrasse, close to the Stadtkirche.

He died at Wittenberg on 10 December 1569. He is buried near the altar in St Mary's Church (Stadtkirche Wittenberg). The grave is less than 100m from his home.

== Memorials ==
In 1573 Lucas Cranach the Younger created a memorial painting, showing Eber in the Garden of Gethsemane in the church.

== Remembrance ==
Johann Sebastian Bach composed in 1725 a chorale cantata on Eber's hymn in eight stanzas, Herr Jesu Christ, wahr' Mensch und Gott, BWV 127. Bach also composed a church cantata Herr Gott, dich loben alle wir, BWV 130, BWV 130, based on his eponymous 1554 hymn in twelve stanzas.
