= Du wahrer Gott und Davids Sohn, BWV 23 =

Church cantata by Johann Sebastian Bach

Du wahrer Gott und Davids Sohn
- BWV 23
- Church cantata by J. S. Bach
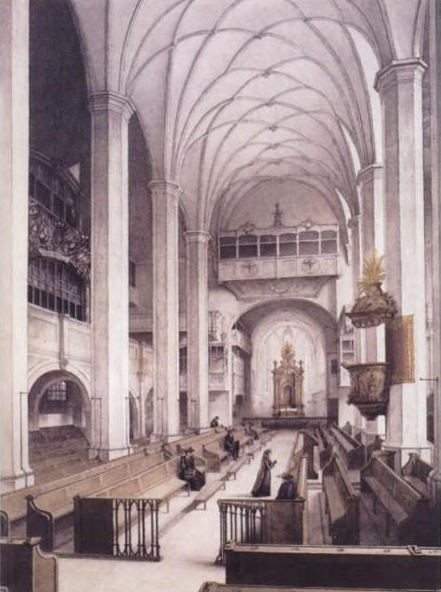
- Thomaskirche Leipzig, the location of the first performance, 1885
- Related: performed with BWV 22
- Occasion: Quinquagesima
- Chorale: "Christe, du Lamm Gottes"
- Composed: 1723?: Köthen
- Performed: 7 February 1723 and 20 February 1724, Leipzig
- Movements: 4
- Vocal: solo soprano, alto and tenor; SATB choir
- Instrumental: (cornett); (3 trombones); 2 oboes (oboes d'amore); 2 violins; viola; continuo

Du wahrer Gott und Davids Sohn (You true God and Son of David), BWV 23, (Note: "BWV" is Bach-Werke-Verzeichnis, a thematic catalogue of Bach's works.) is a church cantata by Johann Sebastian Bach. He composed it in Köthen between 1717 and 1723 for Quinquagesima Sunday and performed it as an audition piece for the position of Thomaskantor in Leipzig on 7 February 1723. The Sunday was the last occasion for music at church before the quiet time of Lent.

Bach had at least the first three movements ready for the audition in Leipzig and may have added the substantial last movement, derived from the lost Weimarer Passion, rather late. The cantata deals with healing the blind near Jericho. An anonymous author stayed close to the gospel, having the blind man call Jesus in the first movement, and begging Jesus not to pass in the second. In the last movement Bach presents an extended version of "Christe, du Lamm Gottes", the German Agnus Dei of the Lutheran mass. He scored the cantata for three vocal soloists, a four-part choir, and a Baroque instrumental ensemble with oboes, strings and continuo.

Bach possibly led the audition performance of the work in Leipzig in the Thomaskirche on 7 February 1723, probably after the sermon. He performed the cantata again for the same occasion on 20 February 1724, this time reinforcing the voices by a brass choir in the final movement.

== History and words ==
Bach probably composed the cantata in Köthen between 1717 and 1723 for Estomihi (Quinquagesima), the last Sunday before Lent. He revised it, transposing it from C minor to B minor and possibly adding the last movement, to be a test piece, together with Jesus nahm zu sich die Zwölfe, BWV 22, for his application for the position of Thomaskantor, director of church music in Leipzig. The prescribed readings for the Sunday were taken from the First Epistle to the Corinthians, "praise of love" (1 Corinthians 13:1–13), and from the Gospel of Luke, healing the blind near Jericho (Luke 18:31–43). The authorship of the poetry is unknown. The Sunday was meaningful because it was the last chance to perform cantata music before the quiet time of Lent began.

The chorale theme assigned to "Christe, du Lamm Gottes", first appeared in print in Johannes Bugenhagen's Braunschweig church order, published in Wittenberg in 1525. Luther assigned it then to the Kyrie eleison of his Deutsche Messe.

Bach possibly led the audition performance of the work in Leipzig in the Thomaskirche on 7 February 1723, probably after the sermon. It is unclear whether a "test" performance of the 1723 revised version took place in Köthen before Bach's audition. Bach performed the cantata again for the same occasion on 20 February 1724, reinforcing the voices by a brass choir in the final movement. When he performed the cantata again between 1728 and 1731, he returned to the original Köthen key and performed without brass.

== Music ==
=== Structure and scoring ===
Bach structured the cantata in four movements: a duet for soprano (S) and alto (A), a recitative for tenor (T), a chorus, and a closing chorale. He scored it for the three vocal soloists, a four-part choir and a Baroque instrumental ensemble. The duration is given as 20 minutes.

In the following table of the movements, the scoring and keys follow the Neue Bach-Ausgabe for the version performed in 1724, which is in B minor, uses oboes d'amore (Oa) in the first movement and brass playing colla parte with the voices in the last movement, a choir of cornett (Ct) and three trombones (Tb) (or trumpets (Tr)). According to the Bach scholar Alfred Dürr, the audition version of 1723 had no reinforcement by brass, matching the scoring of the other audition piece. The originally composed version, which was not performed until 1728, was in C minor, had oboes in the opening movement and no brass. The time signatures are taken from the book on all of the cantatas by Dürr, using the symbol for common time (4/4). The continuo, played throughout, is not shown.

Movements of Du wahrer Gott und Davids Sohn, BWV 23
No.	Title	Text	Type	Vocal	Winds	Strings	Key	Time
1	Du wahrer Gott und Davids Sohn	anon.	Aria (Duetto)	S A	2Oa	2Vl Va	B minor	common time
2	Ach! gehe nicht vorüber	anon.	Recitative e chorale	T	2Ob	2Vl Va		common time
3	Aller Augen warten, Herr	anon.	Chorus w. TB duet	SATB + TB	2Ob	2Vl Va	D major	3/4
4	Christe, du Lamm Gottes	German Agnus Dei	Chorale	SATB	Ct 3Tb 2Ob	2Vl Va	F-sharp minor; B minor	common time

=== Movements ===
In this cantata, Bach combines elements of ritornello and concerto writing to expand his range of structural experimentation. Although the closing chorale was a later addition, its melody is incorporated earlier in the piece, unifying the form. The theme of the text is optimistic, but the music throughout has a sense of underlying sadness. Craig Smith describes the cantata as "one of the densest and greatest". The Bach scholar Christoph Wolff notes that the opening duet and also the duet passages on the chorus are in the style of Bach's secular cantatas written in Köthen.

==== 1 ====
The opening movement, "Du wahrer Gott und Davids Sohn" (You true God and Son of David), is "a sinewy [sic] and somewhat enigmatic quintet" for soprano and alto voices (assuming the role of the blind man addressing Jesus) with low active oboes and continuo. The movement is in adapted ternary form with an opening and closing "Italianate" ritornello. The soprano line includes a "drooping" motive, hinting at later harmonic and emotional development. There is a "thorny, even awkward juxtaposition of triple and duple meters" throughout the duet.

==== 2 ====
The tenor recitative, "Ach! gehe nicht vorüber" (Ah! do not pass by), is similar to that for bass in Jesus nahm zu sich die Zwölfe: they are both in major mode and accompanied by chordal strings underlying the vocal line. This movement adds an instrumental rendition of the melody of the closing chorale in oboe and violin.

==== 3 ====
The chorus, "Aller Augen warten, Herr" (All eyes wait, Lord), is, according to the musicologist Julian Mincham, "dance-like but not toe-tapping, major but not ebulliently so, employing the full chorus but restrained throughout". The form is a free rondo with interspersed extended episodes of tenor and bass duet. The opening includes the BACH motif.

==== 4 ====
The last movement, "Christe, du Lamm Gottes" (Christ, Lamb of God), is probably older than the first three movements and may have originated in the lost Weimarer Passion from 1717. The three calls of the Agnus Dei are all set differently, with an independent prelude and interludes by the oboes and strings, between the verses. The first verse is marked "adagio". Instrumental motifs are derived from the hymn tune, which appears in the soprano and mostly chordal support by the lower voices. In the second verse, marked "andante", the tune appears in a three-part canon in soprano, oboes and first violin. The third verse returns to B minor. It has the tune in the soprano with polyphony in the lower voices and the instruments. The oboes play a syncopated independent role, while the strings support the voices, and the oboes in the interludes. The complex artful composition is a good preparation for Lent, the time of the Passion. Bach used it again to conclude the second version of his St John Passion in 1725.

== Recordings ==
The selection is taken from the listing on the Bach Cantatas Website.

Recordings of Du wahrer Gott und Davids Sohn, BWV 23
Title	Conductor / Choir / Orchestra	Soloists	Label	Year
J. S. Bach: Cantatas BWV 23 & BWV 159	Kurt Thomas Frankfurter Kantorei Deutsche Bachsolisten	Ursula Buckel; Eva Bornemann; Johannes Hoefflin	Cantate	1962
Bach Cantatas Vol. 2 – Easter	Karl Richter Münchener Bach-Chor Münchener Bach-Orchester	Edith Mathis; Anna Reynolds; Peter Schreier	Archiv Produktion	1974
Les Grandes Cantates de J. S. Bach Vol. 29	Fritz Werner Heinrich-Schütz-Chor Heilbronn Württembergisches Kammerorchester Heilbronn	Ingeborg Reichelt; Barbara Scherler; Friedrich Melzer	Erato	1973
J. S. Bach: Das Kantatenwerk – Sacred Cantatas Vol. 2	Gustav Leonhardt: Tölzer Knabenchor; Choir of King's College; Leonhardt-Consort	soloist of the Tölzer Knabenchor; Paul Esswood; Marius van Altena	Teldec	1973
Die Bach Kantate Vol. 28	Helmuth Rilling Gächinger Kantorei Bach-Collegium Stuttgart	Arleen Augér; Helen Watts; Aldo Baldin	Hänssler	1977
J. S. Bach: Complete Cantatas Vol. 3	Ton Koopman Amsterdam Baroque Orchestra & Choir	Barbara Schlick; Elisabeth von Magnus; Paul Agnew	Antoine Marchand	1995
J. S. Bach: Cantatas Vol. 8 – Leipzig Cantatas	Masaaki Suzuki Bach Collegium Japan	Midori Suzuki; Yoshikazu Mera; Gerd Türk	BIS	1998
Bach Edition Vol. 5 – Cantatas Vol. 2	Pieter Jan Leusink Holland Boys Choir Netherlands Bach Collegium	Ruth Holton; Sytse Buwalda; Nico van der Meel	Brilliant Classics	1999
Bach Cantatas Vol. 21: Cambridge/Walpole St Peter	John Eliot Gardiner: Monteverdi Choir; Choir of Clare College; Choir of Trinity College; English Baroque Soloists	Ruth Holton; Claudia Schubert; James Oxley	Soli Deo Gloria	2000
J. S. Bach: Cantatas for the Complete Liturgical Year Vol. 6 (Sexagesima and Estomihi Sundays)	Sigiswald Kuijken La Petite Bande	Siri Thornhill; Petra Noskaiová; Marcus Ullmann; Jan van der Crabben	Accent	2007
J. S. Bach: Jesus, deine Passion	Philippe Herreweghe Collegium Vocale Gent	Dorothee Mields; Matthew White; Jan Kobow	Harmonia Mundi France	2007
