= Quinquagesima =

Sunday before Ash Wednesday

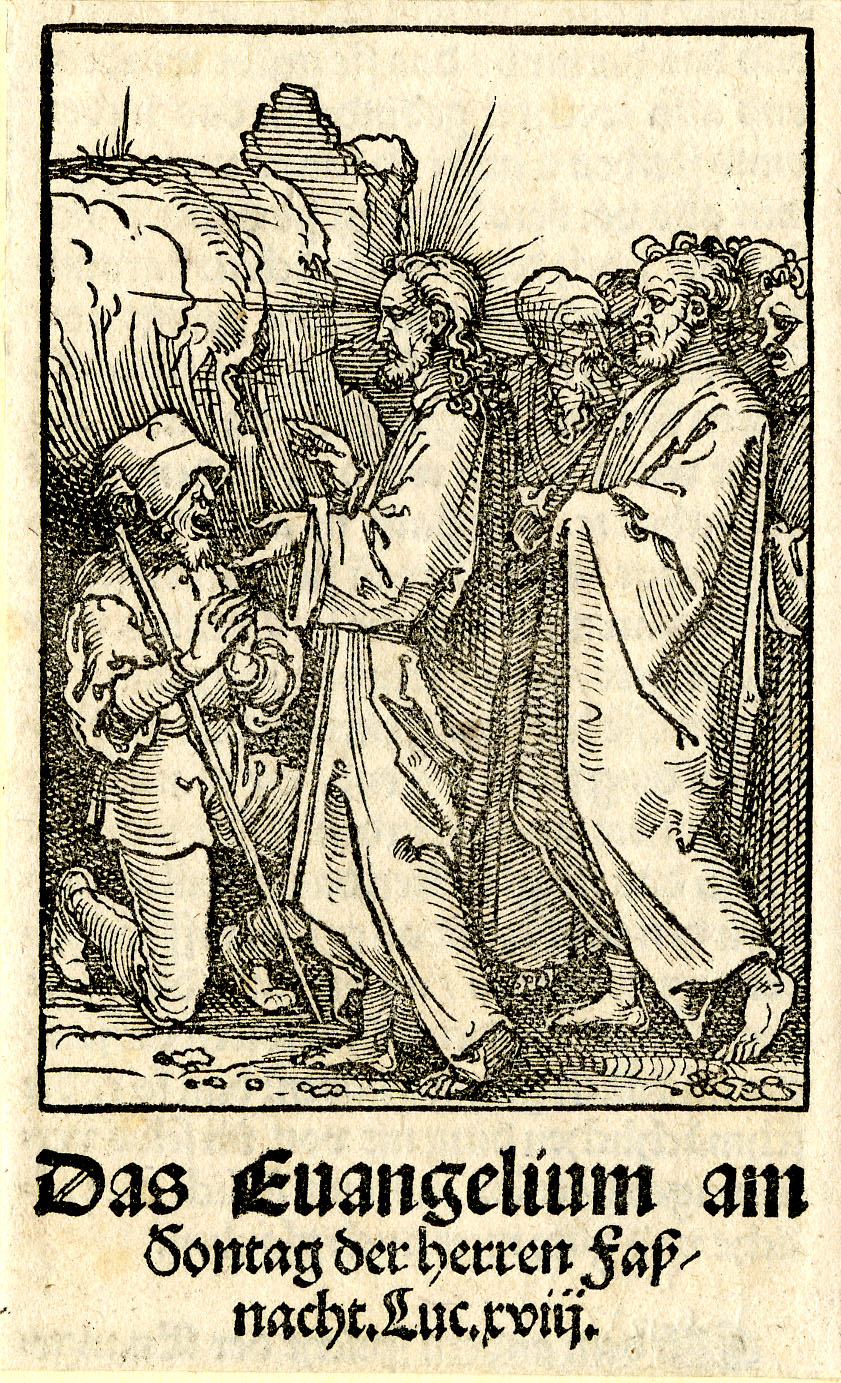
- Illustration of Jesus healing the blind near Jericho for Quinquagesima
- Liturgical color: Violet
- Significance: Preparation for Lent
- Date: Last Sunday before Ash Wednesday (49 calendar days before Easter Sunday)
- 2025 date: March 2
- 2026 date: February 15
- 2027 date: February 7
- 2028 date: February 27
- Related to: Pre-Lent, Shrovetide

Quinquagesima (/ˌkwɪŋkwəˈdʒɛsɪmə/), in the Western Christian Churches, is the last pre-Lenten Sunday, being the Sunday before Ash Wednesday, and the first day of Carnival (also known as Shrovetide). It is also called Quinquagesima Sunday, Quinquagesimae, Estomihi, Shrove Sunday, Pork Sunday, or the Sunday next before Lent.

Being the Lord's Day before the start of the Lenten season, it is known for meat consumption as people feast before starting their fast on Ash Wednesday, the first day of Lent. Historically Lutheran countries such as Denmark mark Quinquagesima Sunday as the peak of the Fastelavn. After attending the Divine Service on Shrove Sunday, congregants enjoy Shrovetide buns (fastelavnsboller). Children often dress up and collect money from people while singing. Christians in these nations carry Shrovetide rods (fastelavnsris), which "branches decorated with sweets, little presents, etc., that are used to decorate the home or give to children."

In the Revised Common Lectionary the Sunday before Lent is designated "Transfiguration Sunday", and the gospel reading is the story of the Transfiguration of Jesus from Matthew, Mark, or Luke. Some churches whose lectionaries derive from the Revised Common Lectionary, e.g. the Church of England, use these readings but do not designate the Sunday "Transfiguration Sunday".

== Etymology and date ==
The name Quinquagesima originates from Latin quinquagesimus (fiftieth). This is in reference to the fifty days before Easter Day using inclusive counting which counts both Sundays (normal counting would count only one of these). Since the forty days of Lent do not include Sundays, the first day of Lent, Ash Wednesday, succeeds Quinquagesima Sunday by only three days.

The name Estomihi is derived from the incipit or opening words of the Introit for the Sunday, Esto mihi in Deum protectorem, et in locum refugii, ut salvum me facias, ("Be Thou unto me a God, a Protector, and a place of refuge, to save me") Psalms 31:3

The earliest Quinquagesima Sunday can occur is February 1 and the latest is March 7.

== Significance ==
=== Western Christianity ===
==== Roman Catholic Church ====
In the Roman Catholic Church, the terms for this Sunday and the two immediately before it (Sexagesima and Septuagesima Sundays) were eliminated in the reforms following the Second Vatican Council, and these Sundays are part of Ordinary Time.

According to the reformed Roman Rite Roman Catholic calendar, this Sunday is now known by its number within Ordinary Time — fourth through ninth, depending upon the date of Easter. The earlier form of the Roman Rite, with its references to Quinquagesima Sunday, and to the Sexagesima and Septuagesima Sundays, continues to be observed in some communities.

In traditional lectionaries, the Sunday concentrates on Luke 18:31–43, "Jesus took the twelve aside and said, 'Lo, we go to Jerusalem, and everything written by the prophets about the Son of Man shall be fulfilled' ... The disciples, however, understood none of this," which from verse 35 is followed by Luke's version of Healing the blind near Jericho. The passage presages the themes of Lent and Holy Week.

In most churches, palms blessed on Palm Sunday of the previous year are burned on this day after the last Mass of the day, the ashes of these burned palms are used for the liturgy of Ash Wednesday.

==== Lutheran Churches ====
In Lutheranism Luke 18:31–43 is combined with 1 Corinthians 13:1–13 (Paul's praise of love).

Composers writing cantatas for Estomihi Sunday include:

- Johann Sebastian Bach: BWV 22, 23, 127 and 159 (see Church cantata (Bach)#Estomihi)
- Christoph Graupner: 25 cantatas (see List of cantatas by Christoph Graupner#GWV 1119)
- Georg Philipp Telemann: 21 extant cantatas, including TWV 1:1258 (Harmonischer Gottes-Dienst).

Lutheran countries such as Denmark mark Quinquagesima Sunday as the peak of the Fastelavn. After attending the Mass on Shrove Sunday, congregants enjoy Shrovetide buns (fastelavnsboller), "round sweet buns that are covered with icing and filled with cream and/or jam." Children often dress up and collect money from people while singing. They also practice the tradition of hitting a barrel, which represents fighting Satan; after doing this, children enjoy the sweets inside the barrel. Lutheran Christians in these nations carry Shrovetide rods (fastelavnsris), which "branches decorated with sweets, little presents, etc., that are used to decorate the home or give to children."

==== Anglican Communion ====
This Sunday has different names in the two different calendars used in the Church of England: in the Book of Common Prayer calendar (1662) this Sunday is known as Quinquagesima, while in the Common Worship calendar (2000) it is known as the Next Sunday before Lent. In this latter calendar it is part of the period of Ordinary Time that falls between the feasts of the Presentation of Christ in the Temple (the end of the Epiphany season) and Ash Wednesday.

==== Methodism ====
In the United Methodist Church and the Global Methodist Church this Sunday is known as Transfiguration Sunday and is the last of the "Sundays after Epiphany". The liturgical color used will typically be white, and some churches may observe the practice of burning the previous year's palms to create the ashes for Ash Wednesday.

=== Eastern Christianity and Oriental Christianity ===
==== Eastern Orthodox Church ====
In the Eastern Orthodox Church, its equivalent, the Sunday before Great Lent, is called "Forgiveness Sunday", "Maslenitsa Sunday", or "Cheesefare Sunday". The latter name comes because this Sunday concludes Maslenitsa, the week in which butter and cheese may be eaten, which are prohibited during Great Lent. The former name derives from the fact that this Sunday is followed by a special Vespers called "Forgiveness Vespers" which opens Great Lent.

On this day, the Eastern Orthodox Church Christians at the liturgy listen to the Gospel speaking of forgiveness of sins, fasting, and the gathering of treasures in heaven. On this day, all Orthodox Christians ask each other for forgiveness to begin the Great Lent with a good heart, to focus on the spiritual life, to purify the heart from sin in confession, and to meet Easter—the day of the Resurrection of Jesus—with a pure heart. This is the last day before Lent when non-lenten food is eaten.

== See also ==
- Laskiainen
- Three Sundays of Commemoration

Sundays of the Easter cycle
Preceded by Sexagesima	Quinquagesima; February 15, 2026	Succeeded by First Sunday of Lent
