= Sexagesima Sermon =

- Sermão da Sexagésima
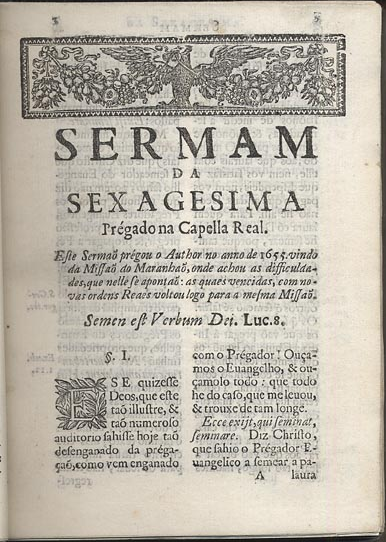
- First page of the Sexagesia Sermon, as published in 1679

Information
- Religion: Catholic (Jesuit)
- Author: António Vieira
- Language: Portuguese
- Period: 1655
- Sexagesima Sermon at Portuguese Wikisource

The Sexagesima Sermon (Portuguese: Sermão da Sexagésima) is a religious and literary work by Portuguese Jesuit missionary António Vieira. The sermon was held in the Capela Real in Lisbon on Sexagesima Sunday of 1655, which places it on 31 January of that year. It opens a 15-volume series that he wrote on the art of preaching. Stylistically, the series is heavily inspired by the literary movement of conceptismo.

The Biblical passage for this Sunday as specified by the liturgical calendar is the Parable of the Sower in Luke 8. In the ten sections of his sermon, Vieira concentrated on verse 11b of that chapter: "The seed is the word of God" (Latin: Semen est verbum Dei), choosing as the theme for his sermon the metaphor "to preach is to sow". He asked himself: "If God's Word is so effective and so powerful, why do we see so little fruit of it?" Vieira used this to criticise the sermons of other preachers, contrasting the simplicity of his own preaching with their rambled ways of addressing various subjects at once.
