= Alleluia, dulce carmen =

Christian hymn

Alleluia, dulce carmen (Alleluia, song of gladness) is a medieval Latin hymn sung during the week before Septuagesima as a preparation for the dismissal of the "Alleluia" during Lent.

== History ==
The earliest form of Alleluia, dulce carmen is found in manuscripts of the 11th century kept at the British Museum.

It was traditionally sung in Gallican liturgies, such as the rite of Lyon, or English liturgies, such as the use of Sarum, in "clausula Alleluia", as a farewell to the Alleluia in the week before the Sunday of Septuagesima, until the first Vespers.

Translations in English language of the Alleluia, dulce carmen include Alleluia! best and sweetest by John Chandler, written in 1837; Alleluia! song of gladness by John Mason Neale, written in 1851; and many more in the second half of the 19th century with close resemblance.

== Melody ==
While the original medieval manuscripts do not give a specific written melody, English translations of the 19th century relied on the transcriptions from the Gregorian repertoire of François de La Feillée, an 18th-century priest attached to the cathedral at Chartres who had promoted and gathered neo-Gallican chant outside of the strictly Roman liturgy.

Various melodies are currently in use. Hymn tunes include Dulce Carmen by Michael Haydn, Alleluia, Dulce Carmen by Edward J. Hopkins, and Lauda Anima (Praise, My Soul) by John Goss. Plainsong chants include Urbs Beata Jerusalem and Tibi Christus Splendor Patris.

== Lyrics ==
Alleluia, dulce carmen expresses mixed feelings of joy and bitterness. The setting, which refers to the Babylonian captivity with elements linked to Psalm 134 and Psalm 135, is also the main theme of pre-Lenten celebrations in Eastern Orthodoxy Sundays of the Triodion. It is in contrast with the hymn Alleluia perenne used in the Mozarabic rite in the same liturgical context but which establishes the perpetuity of the alleluia in heaven, underscoring the hope of its gladsome return, and the security that there the Church never ceases to sing "Alleluia" throughout the year.

Here is the lyric translation by Anglican cleric John Mason Neale, composed in 1851:

Alleluia, dulce carmen
Vox perennis gaudii
Alleluia, laus suavis
Est choris caelestibus,
Quod canunt Dei manentes
In domo per saecula.

Alleluia, laeta mater
Cóncinis, Jerúsalem,
Allelúia, vox tuórum
Civium gaudentium:
Exsules nos flere cogunt
Babylónis flúmina.

Alleluia, non merémur
Nunc perenne psállere,
Allelúia nos reátus
Cogit intermíttere;
Tempus instat quo peracta
Lugeámus crímina.

Unde laudando precámur
Te, beáta Trínitas,
Ut tuum nobis vidére
Pascha des in æthere
Quo tibi læte canámus
Allelúia pérpetim. Amen.

O Alleluia, song of gladness,
Voice of joy that cannot die;
Alleluia is the anthem
ever dear to choirs on high;
In the house of God abiding
thus they sing eternally.

Alleluia thou resoundest,
True Jerusalem and free;
Alleluia, joyful mother,
All thy children sing with thee;
But by Babylon’s sad waters
mourning exiles now are we.

Alleluia we deserve not
here to chant forevermore;
Alleluia our transgressions
make us for a while give o’er;
For the holy time is coming
bidding us our sins deplore.

Therefore in our hymns we pray Thee,
grant us, blessèd Trinity,
At the last to keep Thine Easter
in our home beyond the sky;
There to Thee forever singing
Alleluia joyfully. Amen.

== Bibliography ==
- Stingl, Anton (2018). Alleluia, dulce carmen: Aspekte des gregorianischen Alleluia (in German). EOS. ISBN 978-3-8306-7931-8.
