= Herr Gott, dich loben alle wir, BWV 130 =

Chorale cantata by Johann Sebastian Bach

Herr Gott, dich loben alle wir
- BWV 130
- Chorale cantata by J. S. Bach
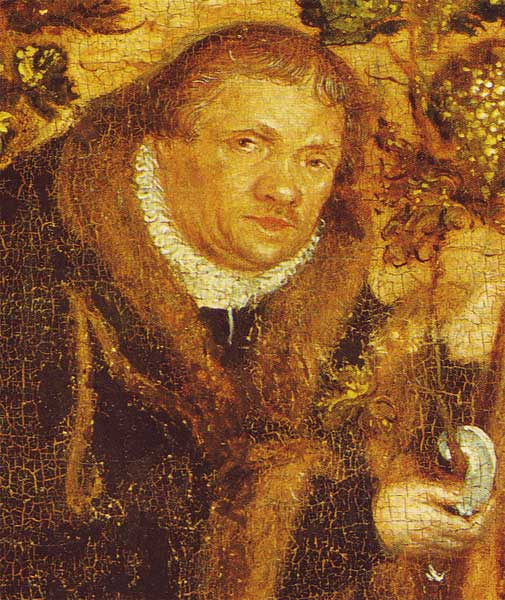
- Paul Eber, the author of the hymn's text
- Occasion: Michaelmas, feast of the archangel Michael
- Chorale: "Herr Gott, dich loben alle wir by Paul Eber
- Performed: 29 September 1724: Leipzig
- Movements: six
- Vocal: SATB choir and solo
- Instrumental: 3 trumpets; timpani; flauto traverso; 3 oboes; strings; continuo

Herr Gott, dich loben alle wir (Lord God, we all praise you), BWV 130, is a chorale cantata by Johann Sebastian Bach for the Feast of Archangel Michael (German: Michaelis; 29 September). It is based on Paul Eber's 1554 Lutheran hymn about the angels in twelve stanzas "Herr Gott, dich loben alle wir", to a melody known in English as Old 100th. The cantata was performed on that feast day in 1724.

Herr Gott, dich loben alle wir belongs to Bach's chorale cantata cycle, the second cycle during his tenure as Thomaskantor that began in 1723. The text retains the first and 11th stanza of the chorale unchanged, while the other stanzas were paraphrased into alternating recitatives and arias by an unknown librettist. The cantata is festively scored for SATB soloists and choir, three trumpets, timpani, flauto traverso, three oboes, strings and continuo.

A revised version of the cantata, BWV 130.2, was performed in Leipzig between 1732 and 1735. A manuscript likely from the second half of the 18th century contains two variant versions of the cantata. Whether Bach had anything to do with these versions is not known: a chorale setting which only occurs in these variants was adopted as No. 31 in the second Anhang of the Bach-Werke-Verzeichnis, that is the Anhang of doubtful works.

== History ==
Bach composed the cantata in his second year in Leipzig for St. Michael's Day. That year, Bach composed a cycle of chorale cantatas, begun on the first Sunday after Trinity of 1724. The feast celebrated Archangel Michael and all the angels each year on 29 September. In Leipzig, the day coincided with a trade fair.

The prescribed readings for St Michael's Day were from the Book of Revelation, Michael fighting the dragon (Revelation 12:7–12), and from the Gospel of Matthew, heaven belongs to the children, the angels see the face of God (Matthew 18:1–11). The cantata is based on a 1554 hymn in twelve stanzas by Paul Eber, a paraphrase of Philipp Melanchthon's Latin "Dicimus grates tibi". Each stanza has four lines. The melody was first printed in the Geneva Psalter in 1551. It is attributed to Loys Bourgeois and is known as the famous tune of the Doxology "Praise God, from whom all blessings flow".

The theme of the song, praise and thanks for the creation of the angels is only distantly related to the readings. An unknown librettist retained the first and 11th stanzas as the outer movements of the cantata. He derived movement 2, a recitative, from stanzas 2 and 3, movement 3, an aria, from stanzas 4 to 6, movement 4, a recitative, from stanzas 7 to 9, and movement 5, an aria, from stanza 10. In movement 3, a connection can be drawn from the mentioning of Satan as the "alter Drachen" (old dragon), to Michael's fight. Movement 4 mentions examples of angelic protection in the Bible, of Daniel (Daniel 6:23), and of the three men in the fiery furnace (Daniel 3). Prayer for protection by angels, such as Elijah being taken to heaven (2 Kings 2:11), continues the text, concluded with general praise, thanks and the request for future protection. Bach first performed the cantata on 29 September 1724.

== Music ==
=== Structure and scoring ===
Bach structured the cantata in six even movements. The chorale tune is used in the outer choral movements, a chorale fantasia and a four-part closing chorale. The inner movements are alternating recitatives and arias. Bach scored the work for four vocal soloists (soprano (S), alto (A), tenor (T) and bass (B)), a four-part choir, a four-part choir, and a festive Baroque instrumental ensemble of three trumpets (Tr), timpani, flauto traverso (Ft), three oboes (Ob), two violins (Vl), viola (Va), and basso continuo.

In the following table of the movements, the keys and time signatures are taken from the Bach scholar Alfred Dürr, using the symbol for common time. The instruments are shown separately for brass, woodwinds and strings, while the continuo, playing throughout, is not shown.

Movements of Herr Gott, dich loben alle wir
No.	Title	Text	Type	Vocal	Brass	Woods	Strings	Key	Time
1	Herr Gott, dich loben alle wir	Eber	Chorus	SATB	3Tr	3Ob	2Vl Va	C major	common time
2	Ihr heller Glanz und hohe Weisheit zeigt	anon.	Recitative	A					common time
3	Der alte Drache brennt vor Neid	anon.	Aria	B	3Tr			C major	common time
4	Wohl aber uns, daß Tag und Nacht	anon.	Recitative	S T			2Vl Va		common time
5	Laß, o Fürst der Cherubinen	anon.	Aria	T		Ft		G major	common time
6	Darum wir billig loben dich	Eber	Chorale	SATB	3Tr	3Ob	2Vl Va	C major	common time

=== Movements ===
==== 1 ====
In the opening chorus, "Herr Gott, dich loben alle wir ... für dein Geschöpf der Engel schon" (Lord God, we all praise you ... for your creation of the beautiful angels), Bach illustrates the singing of angels in different choirs by assigning different themes to the strings, the oboes and the trumpets, in a rich scoring typical only for the most festive occasions of the liturgical year such as Christmas. Mincham compares the movement to the 15 opening movements preceding it in the second annual cycle: "It is the most lavishly scored chorus so far and certainly the most extrovertly festive in character".

==== 2 ====
A recitative for alto, "Ihr heller Glanz und hohe Weisheit zeigt, wie Gott sich zu uns Menschen neigt" (Their brilliant radiance and exalted wisdom shows how God bends himself down to us humans), is set secco. Two lines from the original chorale are retained.

==== 3 ====
A bass aria, "Der alte Drache brennt vor Neid" (The old dragon burns with envy), is unusually scored for only trumpets, timpani and continuo, describing the battle of the angels against Satan.

==== 4 ====
A duet recitative of soprano and tenor, "Wohl aber uns, daß Tag und Nacht die Schar der Engel wacht" (But it is fortunate for us, who day and night are guarded by the throng of angels), recalls guardian angels saving Daniel in the lions' den and the three men in the furnace.

==== 5 ====
An aria for tenor, "Laß, o Fürst der Cherubinen" (Allow, O Prince of the cherubim), John Eliot Gardiner, who conducted the Bach Cantata Pilgrimage in 2000, compared the flute line in the gavotte to "perhaps the fleetness of angelic transport on Elijah's chariot", which is mentioned in the text.

==== 6 ====
The closing chorale, "Darum wir billig loben dich" (Therefore, we rightly praise you), is a four-part setting of the 11th hymn stanza that includes again "the angelic trumpets". Bach had intended to set also the 12th stanza, but he crossed it out in the score, and the extant parts only have the 11th stanzas's text.

== Manuscripts and publication ==
The original score was inherited by Wilhelm Friedemann Bach, and is now in private ownership. The original parts belonged first to the Thomasschule in Leipzig as all the other parts from chorale cantata cycle, but they came in Hans Georg Nägeli's possession. When he died, they were split and auctioned to collectors. Bass, traverso and timpani parts have been lost, with only reproductions of their first pages available. Parts of the figured continuo part are also missing.

The cantata was first published in 1878 in the first complete edition of Bach's work, the Bach-Gesellschaft Ausgabe. The volume in question was edited by Alfred Dörffel. In the Neue Bach-Ausgabe it was published in 1973, edited by Marianne Helms, with a critical report following in 1989.

== Variant versions ==
BWV 130.2 is a modified version of the cantata which Bach developed in the 1730s for a new performance on Michaelis. The manuscript P 101 at the Berlin State Library, which was likely written in the second half of the 18th century, contains two variant versions of the cantata:

Variants of BWV 130 in the P 101 manuscript
Var.	#	Text	Movement	BWV
I	1	Herr Gott, dich loben alle wir	Chorus	=130/1
II	1(a)	Herr Gott, dich loben alle wir	Chorale	Anh. 31
I	2	Ihr heller Glanz	Recitative (secco; alto)	=130/2
II	2(a)	Ihr heller Glanz	Recitative (secco; alto)	deest
I & II	3	Lasst Teufel, Welt und Sünde	Recitative (accompagnato; soprano & bass duet)	deest
I & II	4	Laß, o Fürst der Cherubinen	Aria (tenor)	=130/5
I & II	5	Wir bitten dich, du wollst allzeit	Chorale	Anh. 31

== Recordings ==
The Dutch website Muziekweb lists several recordings of the cantata, also the Bach Cantatas Website:

Recordings of Herr Gott, dich loben alle wir
Title	Conductor / Choir / Orchestra	Soloists	Label	Year
Les Grandes Cantates de J. S. Bach Vol. 17	Fritz Werner Heinrich-Schütz-Chor Heilbronn Pforzheim Chamber Orchestra	Friederike Sailer; Claudia Hellmann; Helmut Krebs; Jakob Stämpfli	Erato	1961
Ansermet conducts Bach Cantatas No. 130, No. 67, excerpts from No. 101	Ernest Ansermet Chœur Pro Arte de Lausanne L'Orchestre de la Suisse Romande	Elly Ameling; Helen Watts; Werner Krenn; Tom Krause	Decca	1968
Die Bach Kantate Vol. 17	Helmuth Rilling Figuralchor der Gedächtniskirche Stuttgart Bach-Collegium Stuttgart	Kathrin Graf; Gabriele Schnaut; Adalbert Kraus; Wolfgang Schöne	Hänssler	1974
Bach Cantatas Vol. 5	Karl Richter Münchener Bach-Chor Münchener Bach-Orchester	Edith Mathis; Trudeliese Schmidt; Peter Schreier; Dietrich Fischer-Dieskau	Archiv Produktion	1978
J. S. Bach: Das Kantatenwerk • Complete Cantatas • Les Cantates, Folge / Vol. 32	Nikolaus Harnoncourt Tölzer Knabenchor Concentus Musicus Wien	soloists of the Tölzer Knabenchor; Kurt Equiluz; Walter Heldwein	Teldec	1981
J. S. Bach: Complete Cantatas Vol. 10	Ton Koopman Amsterdam Baroque Orchestra & Choir	Caroline Stam; Michael Chance; Paul Agnew; Klaus Mertens	Antoine Marchand	1998
Bach Edition Vol. 9 – Cantatas Vol. 4	Pieter Jan Leusink Holland Boys Choir Netherlands Bach Collegium	Ruth Holton; Sytse Buwalda; Knut Schoch; Bas Ramselaar	Brilliant Classics	1999
Bach Cantatas Vol. 7: Ambronay / Bremen	John Eliot Gardiner Monteverdi Choir English Baroque Soloists	Malin Hartelius; Richard Wyn Roberts; James Gilchrist; Peter Harvey	Soli Deo Gloria	2000
J. S. Bach: Cantatas Vol. 33 – BWV 41, 92, 130	Masaaki Suzuki Bach Collegium Japan	Yukari Nonoshita; Robin Blaze; Jan Kobow; Dominik Wörner	BIS CD1351	2005
Herr Gott, Dich loben alle wir - Cantata, BWV 130	Jos van Veldhoven Netherlands Bach Society	Maria Keohane; Maarten Engeltjes; Benjamin Hulett; Christian Immler	All of Bach Project	2013
