= Herr Jesu Christ, wahr Mensch und Gott =

Lutheran hymn by Paul Eber

- Lutheran hymn
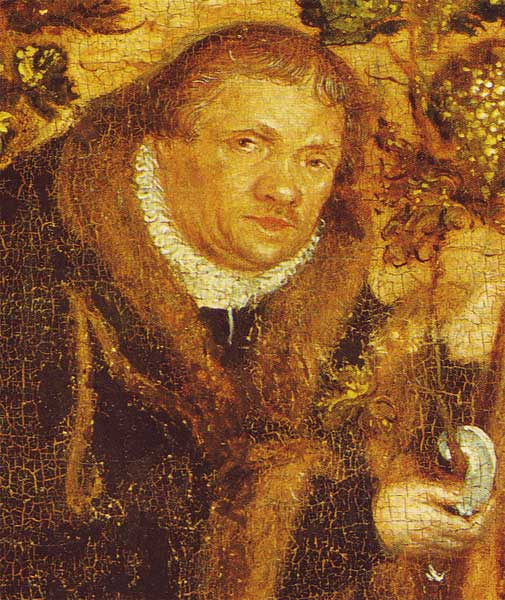
- Eber, portrayed by Lucas Cranach the Younger
- English: Lord Jesus Christ, true man and God
- Catalogue: Zahn 423
- Genre: Hymn
- Text: by Paul Eber
- Language: German
- Meter: 8.8.8.8.8.8 or 8.8.8.8
- Published: 1563

"Herr Jesu Christ, wahr Mensch und Gott" (Lord Jesus Christ, true man and God) is a Lutheran hymn by Paul Eber. It is a hymn for the dying. One of the hymn's tunes, Zahn No. 423, is also used for "Wir danken dir, Herr Jesu Christ".

== History ==
The hymn appeared in both High German, such as a Frankfurt print of 1563, and in Low German spoken mainly in northern Germany, such as the 1565 hymnal Enchiridion geistliker leder und Psalmen from Hamburg, titled "Ein gebedt tho Christo umme ein salich affscheidt uth dissem bedröneden leuende" (A prayer to Christ for a blessed departure from this troubled life). The hymn has been printed in eight stanzas of six lines, but also in twelve stanzas of four lines each. The tune of "Vater unser im Himmelreich" matched the six-line format, the melody of "Christe, der du bist Tag und Licht" was appropriate for the four-line format.

The hymn was also included early in Catholic hymnals, first in a hymnal by Leisentrit, Geistliche Lieder vnd Psalmen, in 1567, and copied to several others as "Ein gar uraltes katholisches Gebet um ein christliches Ende in Todes-Nöthen, auch Morgens und Abends zu beten aus dem Leisentrit" (A very old prayer for a Christian end in death's pain, also to be prayed in the morning and evening from the Leisentrit).

== Lyrics ==
The text is given in the six-line format.

1. Herr Jesu Christ, wahr' Mensch und Gott,
Der du litst Marter, Angst und Spott,
Für mich am Kreuz und endlich starbst
Und mir deins Vaters Huld erwarbst:
Ich bitt durchs bitter Leiden dein,
Du wollst mir Sünder gnädig sein.

2. Wenn ich nun komm in Sterbensnot
Und ringen werde mit dem Tod;
Wenn mir vergeht all mein Gesicht,
Und meine Ohren hören nicht;
Wenn meine Zunge nichts mehr spricht
Und mir vor Angst mien Herz zerbricht.

3. Wenn mein Verstand sich nichts versinnt
Und mir all menschlich Hilf zerrinnt,
So komm, o Herr Christ, mir behend
Zu Hilf an meinem letzten End
Und für mich aus dem Jammertal;
Verkürz mir auch des Todes Qual.

4. Die bösen Geister von mir treib,
mit deinem Geist stets bei mir bleib,
Bis sich die Seel vom Leib abwendt,
So nimm sie, Herr, in deine Händ;
Der Leib hab in der Erd sein Ruh,
Bis sich der Jüngst Tag naht herzu.

5. Ein fröhlich Urständ mir verleih,
Am Jüngsten Gricht mein Fürsprech sei
Und meiner Sünd nicht mehr gedenk,
Aus Gnaden mir das Leben schenk,
Wie du hast zugesaget mir
In deinem Wort, das trau ich dir:

6. Fürwahr, fürwahr, euch sage ich,
Wer mein Wort hält und glaubt an mich,
Der wird nicht kommen ins Gericht
Und den Tod ewig schmecken nicht;
Und ob er gleich hier zeitlich stirbt,
Mitnichten er drum gar verdirbt;

7. Sondern ich will mit starker Hand
Ihn reißen aus des Todes Band
Und zu mir nehmen in mein Reich;
Da soll er dann mit mir zugleich
In Freuden leben ewiglich."
Dazu hilf uns ja gnädiglich.

8. Ach Herr, vergib all unsre Schuld;
Hilf, dass wir warten mit Geduld,
Bis unser Stündlein kommt herbei;
Auch unser Glaub stets wacker sei,
deim Wort zu trauen stetiglich,
Bis wir entschlafen seliglich.

Translation:

1. Lord Jesus Christ, true man and God,
Who borest anguish, scorn, the rod,
And diedst at last upon the tree
To gain Thy Father’s grace for me:
I pray Thee, through that bitter woe,
Let me, a sinner, mercy know

2. When comes the hour of failing breath
And I must wrestle, Lord, with death;
When from my sight all fades away,
And when my tongue no more can say,
And when mine ears no more can hear,
And when my heart is racked with fear;

3. When all my mind is darkened o’er,
And human help can do no more;
Then come, Lord Jesus, come with speed,
And help me in the hour of need.
Lead me from this dark vale beneath
And shorten then the pangs of death;

4. And evil spirits drive away,
But let Thy Spirit with me stay,
Until my soul the body leave;
Then in Thy hands my soul receive
And let the earth the body keep
Till the Last Day shall break its sleep.

5. Joyful my resurrection be,
Thou in the Judgment plead for me
And hide my sins, Lord, from Thy face
And give me life, of Thy dear grace!
Implicitly I trust Thee, Lord,
For Thou hast promised in Thy Word:

6. “In truth I tell you, who receives
My Word, and keeps it, and believes.
“Shall never fall God’s wrath beneath,
Shall never taste eternal death;
Though here he must return to dust,
He still is noways therefore lost;

7. “For I will with a mighty hand
Deliver him from death’s strong band
And lift him hence that he shall be
Forever in My realm with Me,
“Forever living there in bliss.”
Oh, let us not that glory miss!

8. Dear Lord, forgive us all our guilt,
Help us to wait until Thou wilt
That we depart; and let our faith
Be brave and conquer e’en in death,
Firm resting in Thy sacred Word
Until we sleep in Thee, our Lord.

— Translated by Catherine Winkworth, 1855.

== Musical settings ==
Johannes Eccard set the first two four-line stanzas as a five-part motet. Johann Sebastian Bach used the hymn as the basis for his chorale cantata Herr Jesu Christ, wahr' Mensch und Gott, BWV 127, in 1725.

The hymn was translated to English and has appeared in 33 hymnals. Catherine Winkworth translated it as "Lord Jesus Christ, true man and God" in 1855.
