= Second Sunday of Lent =

In the Christian liturgical calendar

Second Sunday of Lent (Sunday of Transfiguration)
- Observed by: Western Christianity, Eastern Christianity
- Type: Christian
- Celebrations: Mass, Divine Liturgy, scripture readings
- Observances: Commemoration of the Transfiguration of Jesus
- Date: Second Sunday after Ash Wednesday
- Related to: Lent, Easter

The Second Sunday of Lent, also known as the Sunday of Transfiguration or Reminiscere Sunday is the second Sunday in the season of Lent, a period of penance and preparation leading up to Easter. In many liturgical churches, this day is marked by the reading of the Gospel account of the Transfiguration of Jesus, an event in which Jesus is revealed in divine glory to his disciples Peter, James, and John on a mountain, traditionally identified as Mount Tabor. The observance emphasizes themes of transformation, divine revelation, and preparation for the Passion of Christ.

== Liturgical significance ==
In the Revised Common Lectionary, used by many Western Christian denominations such as the Roman Catholic Church, Anglican Communion, and various Protestant churches, the Old Testament readings relate to Abraham: Genesis 12:1-4 in Year A, recounting God's promise of a blessing on Abraham (then "Abram"); verses from Genesis 17 in Year B, God's promise of a son to be born to Abraham and his wife, Sarah, or from Genesis 22 in the Roman Catholic lectionary, Abraham's willingness to sacrifice his son, Isaac; and from Genesis 15 in Year C, God's covenant with Abraham. The Gospel readings for this Sunday come from one of the Synoptic Gospels—Matthew (17:1–9), Mark (9:2–10), or Luke (9:28–36)—recounting Jesus' Transfiguration. This event is seen as a pivotal moment in the life of Jesus, bridging his earthly ministry and his impending suffering and resurrection.

In Eastern Christianity, particularly within the Eastern Orthodox Church, the Sunday of Gregory Palamas is observed on the Second Sunday of Great Lent in the Eastern Orthodox Church. This day commemorates Saint Gregory Palamas (1296–1359), a prominent Byzantine theologian and hesychast, known for his defense of Hesychasm, a mystical tradition of prayer, against the rationalist critiques of Barlaam of Seminara. The Sunday emphasizes Palamas' teachings on the uncreated light of God, experienced through prayer and asceticism, as affirmed by the Fifth Council of Constantinople in 1351. Liturgically, the day features readings such as Hebrews 1:10–2:3 and Mark 2:1–12, reflecting themes of divine grace and healing. It underscores the Orthodox focus on theosis (divinization) during the Lenten season.

The Transfiguration is more prominently celebrated as a separate Feast of the Transfiguration on August 6 as it is also in the Catholic liturgical calendar.

== Theology ==
The Transfiguration narrative underscores several theological themes central to Lent, including Jesus' divine identity, the resurrection of the dead and Jesus' journey to the cross. These themes may encourage the faithful to reflect on their own spiritual journey during Lent, aligning with the season’s focus on repentance and renewal.

== Liturgical practices ==
During the Mass or Divine Liturgy, hymns and prayers often highlight the Transfiguration. In the Roman Catholic Church, the Collect for the Second Sunday of Lent may invoke the light of Christ revealed in the Transfiguration as a guide for the faithful. The color purple, symbolizing penance, remains the liturgical color, though the theme of divine glory introduces a note of hope amidst Lenten austerity.

In the traditional Tridentine Mass, the propers of the Mass for the Second Sunday of Lent feature Gregorian chant settings which reflect the Transfiguration. The Introit, "Tibi dixit cor meum" (Psalm 26:8-9), expresses a longing to see God's face, echoing the disciples' vision of Christ's glory. The Gradual, "Sciant gentes" (Psalm 82:19, 18), and the Tract, "Commovisti" (Psalm 59:4, 6), emphasize divine power and deliverance, while the Offertory ("Meditabor", Psalm 118:47-48) and Communion ("Visionem quam vidistis", Matthew 17:9) refer directly to the mystical experience on the mount. For the Divine Office, the antiphons and hymns, such as "Visionem quam vidistis" in Vespers, draw from the Gospel narrative, with the Benedictus antiphon highlighting Christ's divine sonship. These chants, rooted in centuries of tradition, underscore the interplay of awe and penitence.

== Cultural observances ==
While the Second Sunday of Lent does not typically feature widespread cultural festivities like Easter Sunday or Christmas, some communities may hold special sermons or devotional activities. In regions with a strong Christian heritage, such as parts of Europe or the Americas, churches may use this day to emphasize catechesis or spiritual retreats.

== See also ==
- Lent
- Transfiguration of Jesus
- Revised Common Lectionary
- Feast of the Transfiguration

Sundays of the Easter cycle
Preceded by Quadragesima	Second Sunday of Lent; March 1, 2026	Succeeded by Third Sunday of Lent
