= Quadragesima Sunday =

The first Sunday in the season of Lent

- Observed by: Western Christianity
- Liturgical color: Violet
- Observances: Church services
- Date: First Sunday of Lent
- 2025 date: March 9
- 2026 date: February 22
- 2027 date: February 14
- 2028 date: March 5

Quadragesima Sunday (also known as Invocabit Sunday) is the first Sunday in Lent, occurring after Ash Wednesday.

The term Quadragesima is derived from the Latin word for "fortieth", as there are exactly forty days from Quadragesima Sunday until Good Friday. However, like Quinquagesima, Sexagesima and Septuagesima, the numeral is more likely an approximation of how many days there are until Easter Sunday, in this case 42. While Quadragesima includes both Sundays and weekdays, the beginning of Lent was later changed to the preceding Wednesday, "Ash Wednesday", to get in forty weekdays.

'Invocabit' is the opening word of the introit for the day.

Quadragesima Sunday may occur as early as February 8 or as late as March 14.

In both the ordinary form of the Roman rite and common English parlance it is known as the First Sunday of Lent.

The buergbrennen festivities centred on a large bonfire are celebrated in the towns and villages of Luxembourg on the first Sunday of Lent to herald the coming of spring.

Sundays of the Easter cycle
Preceded by Quinquagesima	First Sunday of Lent; February 22, 2026	Succeeded by Second Sunday of Lent
