= Philippe Caillard =

French choral conductor (1924–2026)

Philippe Caillard (31 July 1924 – 8 September 2026) was a French choral conductor, professor of music education, technical and pedagogical advisor to the Ministry of Youth and publisher of choral music.

== Life and career ==
Caillard was born in Paris on 31 July 1924. He made about 30 recordings exclusively for Erato Records, 15 of which received a grand prix du disque.

He specialised in teaching choir direction and pedagogy, and founded a vocal ensemble that bears his name. Caillard originally specialised in works of Renaissance music, but his repertory grew over the years. He transcribed and edited ancient vocal music.

Caillard directed various professional choirs of European radio stations and gave many concerts in international festivals at the head of his choir.

Caillard died on 8 September 2026, at the age of 102.
