= Christe, du Lamm Gottes =

Lutheran hymn

- Hymn by Martin Luther
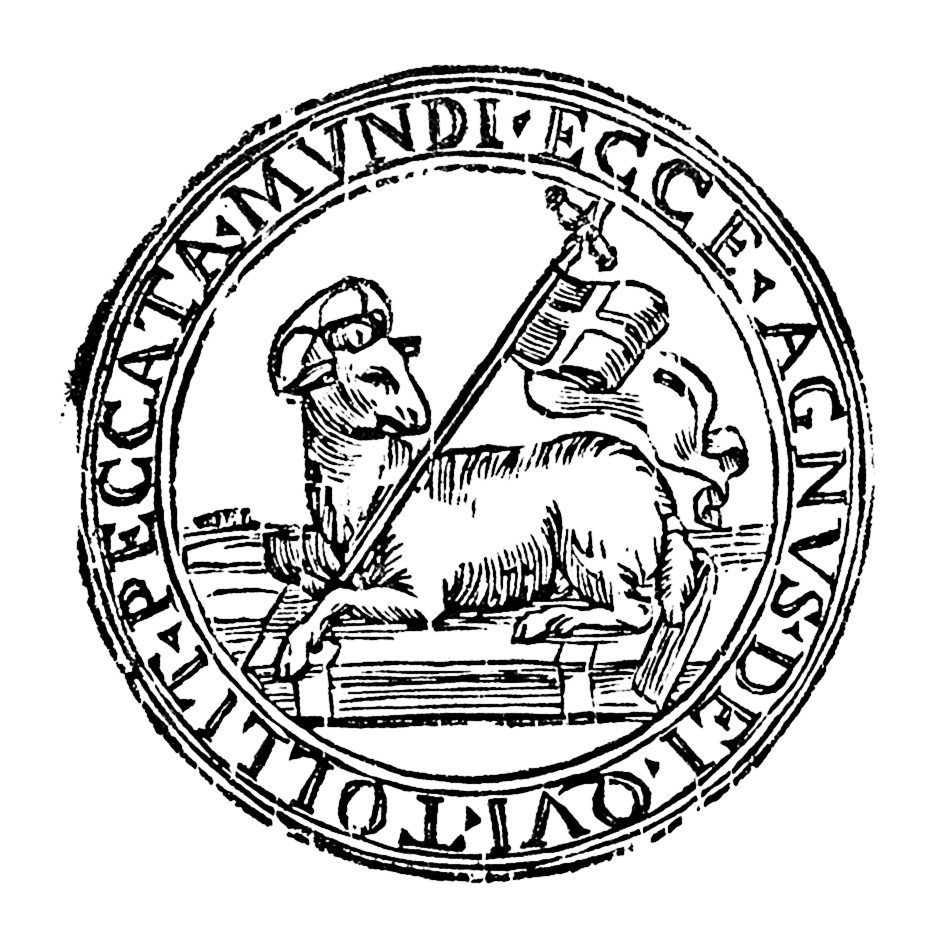
- An image of Christ as the Lamb of God ("Lamm Gottes"), addressed in the hymn
- English: Christ, you Lamb of God
- Catalogue: Zahn 58
- Text: translation
- Language: German
- Based on: "Agnus Dei"
- Published: 1528

"Christe, du Lamm Gottes" (lit. "Christ, you Lamb of God") is a Lutheran hymn, often referred to as the German Agnus Dei. Martin Luther wrote the words of the hymn as a translation of the Latin Agnus Dei from the liturgy of the mass. The tune, Zahn 58, was taken from an older liturgy. The hymn was first published in 1528 and has been the basis for several musical settings by composers such as Bach, Mendelssohn and Hessenberg. It appears in modern German hymnals, both the Protestant Evangelisches Gesangbuch (EG 190:2) and the Catholic Gotteslob (GL 208).

== Background and usage ==
When Luther began the Reformation, he wanted to keep most of the order of the mass but to have it performed in German. In 1526, he published Deutsche Messe as a German language alternative to the Catholic liturgy. Before this publication, his liturgy was first used in the Advent of 1525. The document contains several German hymns, rather than using a German translation of the Credo and Agnus Dei from the Latin liturgy. Instead of using a translation of the Agnus Dei, "Jesus Christus, unser Heiland" was sung during communion because it was more instructive.

The hymn first appeared with the Zahn 58 tune in Bugenhagen's Braunschweig order of church service, printed in Wittenberg in 1528.

The Protestant hymnal Evangelisches Gesangbuch of 1993 has this hymn as EG 190:2. The Catholic hymnal Gotteslob of 2013 has the hymn as GL 208, with a slightly different melody.

== Tune ==
Robin A. Leaver points out that Luther used the tune of the Kyrie for this hymn in his Deutsche Messe to achieve symmetry. The tune is a Gregorian chant in the first mode (Dorian). Leaver notes that although the Zahn 58 tune was not printed with the hymn until 1528, it was already implied in Luther's 1526 Deutsche Messe.

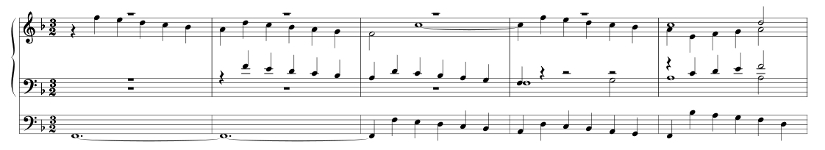
The beginning of Bach's chorale prelude, BWV 619

The hymn has been featured by composers through the centuries, often in elaborate settings. Bach used it several times, notably in the lost Weimarer Passion, in his cantata for the last Sunday before Lent Du wahrer Gott und Davids Sohn, BWV 23, in the second version of his St John Passion, and in a chorale prelude, BWV 619, a canon at the twelfth interval, as part of his Orgelbüchlein.

Felix Mendelssohn used this hymn in a chorale cantata for choir and orchestra. Kurt Hessenberg also employed this hymn in a five-part motet published in 1951.
