= Sexagesima =

Second Sunday before Ash Wednesday

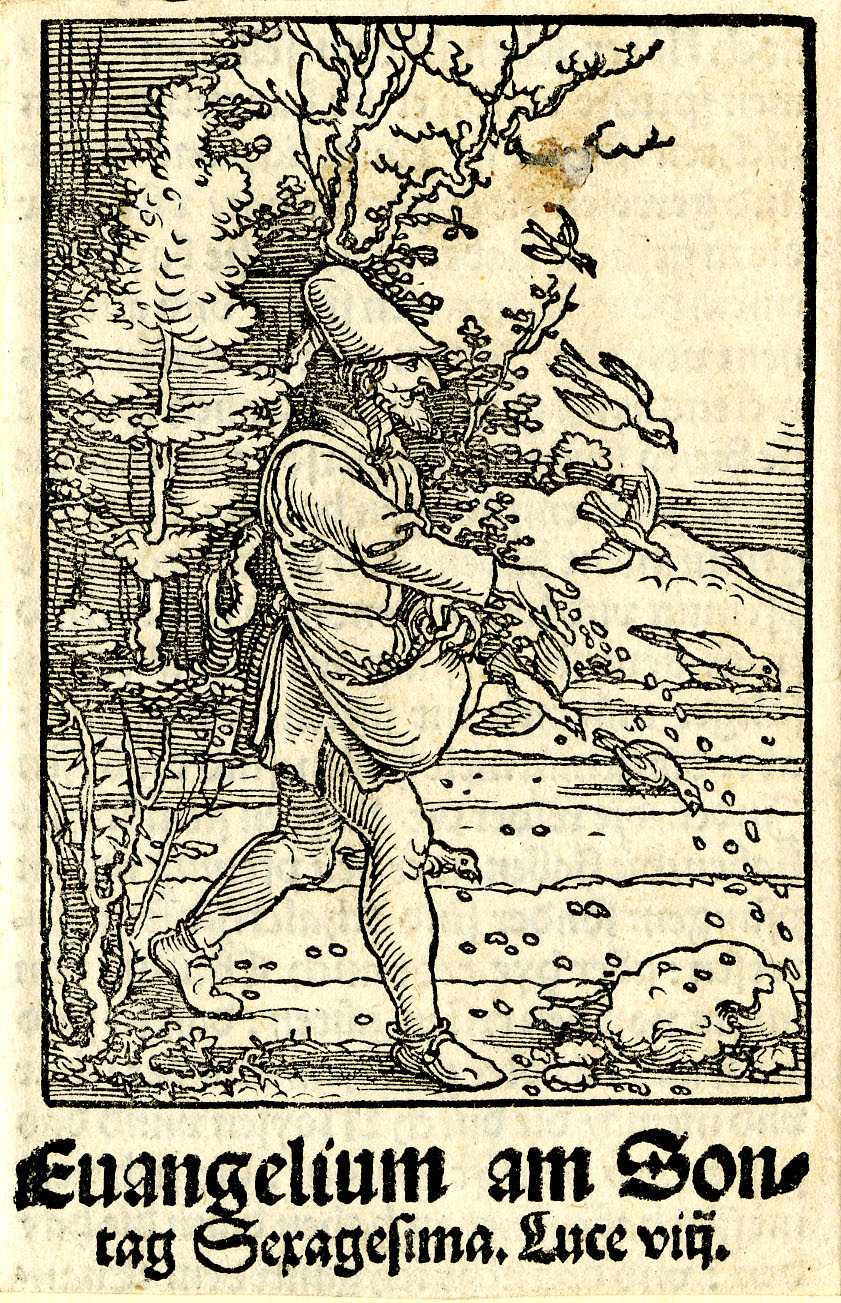
- Illustration of the Parable of the Sower for Sexagesima
- Liturgical color: Violet
- Significance: Preparation for Lent
- Date: Second Sunday before Ash Wednesday (56 calendar days before Easter Sunday)
- 2025 date: February 23
- 2026 date: February 8
- 2027 date: January 31
- 2028 date: February 20
- Related to: Pre-Lent

Sexagesima /sɛksəˈdʒɛsɪmə/, or, in full, Sexagesima Sunday, is the name for the second Sunday before Ash Wednesday in the pre-1970 Roman Rite liturgical calendar of the Catholic Church, and also in that of some Protestant denominations, particularly those with Lutheran and Anglican origins. Sexagesima falls within pre-Lent.

== Significance ==
At Sexagesima, individuals are encouraged to evaluate their current spiritual state and prepare themselves to enter the season of Lent. Such preparations can include confession and such reflections as would be profitable and in keeping with the themes of Septuagesima.

== Etymology and timing ==
The name "Sexagesima" is derived from the Latin sexagesimus, meaning "sixtieth", and appears to be a back-formation of Quinquagesima, the term formerly used to denote the last Sunday before Lent. The latter name alluding to the fact that there are fifty days between that Sunday and Easter, if one counts both days themselves in the total as was the usual custom of the Roman Empire.

Through the same process, the Sunday before Sexagesima Sunday was formerly known as Septuagesima Sunday, and marked the start of the Pre-Lenten Season which eventually became the time for carnival celebrations throughout Europe. This custom was later exported to places settled or colonized by Europeans.

While Quinquagesima (50th day) is mathematically correct, allowing for the inclusive counting, Sexagesima and Septuagesima are only approximations. The exact number of days are 57 and 64 respectively. The earliest Sexagesima can occur is January 25 and the latest is February 28, or February 29 in a leap year.

== Observation ==
=== Anglican Church ===
The 1662 Book of Common Prayer, used in some Anglican provinces, retains Sexagesima Sunday (along with Septuagesima and Quinquagesima), as do the 1928 American Book of Common Prayer and the 1962 Canadian Book of Common Prayer.

=== Latin Catholic Church ===
Following the Second Vatican Council, Sexagesima and the other pre-Lent Sundays were eliminated in the new Roman Catholic liturgical calendar. These reforms went into effect in 1970. Most provinces of the Anglican Communion later followed in abolishing Sexagesima and the other pre-Lent Sundays, though they are retained wherever the Prayer Book Calendar is followed. The earlier form of the Roman Rite, with its references to Quinquagesima, Sexagesima and Septuagesima, continues to be observed in some communities.

== See also ==
- Ordinary Time
- Three Sundays of Commemoration
- Sexagesima Sermon

Sundays of the Easter cycle
Preceded by Septuagesima	Sexagesima; February 8, 2026	Succeeded by Quinquagesima
