= Septuagesima =

Third Sunday before Ash Wednesday

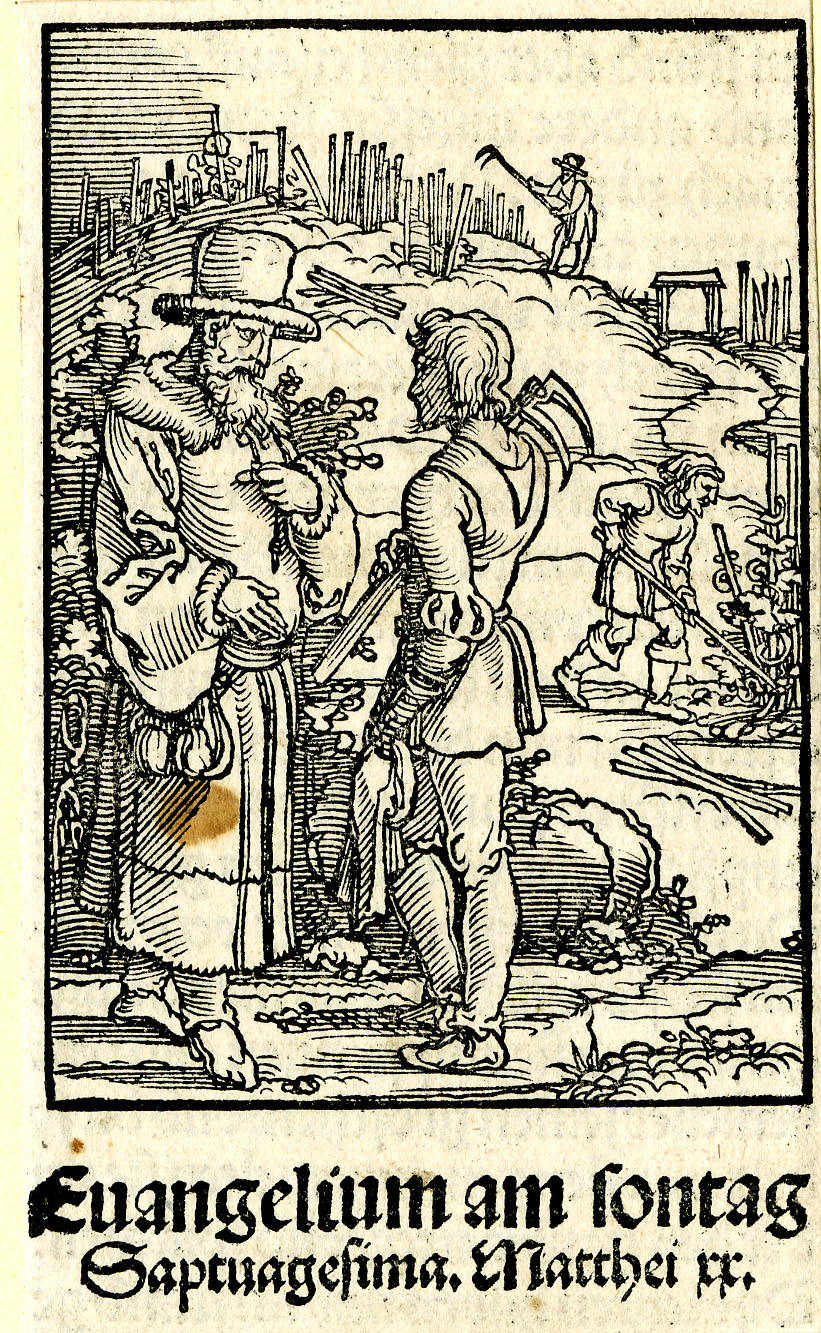
- Illustration of the Parable of the Workers in the Vineyard for Septuagesima
- Liturgical color: Violet
- Significance: Preparation for Lent
- Date: Third Sunday before Ash Wednesday (63 calendar days before Easter Sunday)
- 2025 date: February 16
- 2026 date: February 1
- 2027 date: January 24
- 2028 date: February 13
- Related to: Pre-Lent

Septuagesima (/ˌsɛptjuəˈdʒɛsɪmə/) is the ninth Sunday before Easter, the third before Ash Wednesday. The term is sometimes applied to the seventy days starting on Septuagesima Sunday and ending on the Saturday after Easter. Alternatively, the term is sometimes applied also to the period sometimes called pre-Lent that begins on this day and ends on Shrove Tuesday, the day before Ash Wednesday, when Lent begins.

The other two Sundays in this period of the liturgical year are called Sexagesima and Quinquagesima, the latter sometimes also called Shrove Sunday. The earliest date on which Septuagesima Sunday can occur is January 18 (Easter falling on March 22 in a common year) and the latest is February 22 (Easter falling on April 25 in a leap year).

== Origins of the term ==
Septuagesima comes from the Latin word for "seventieth." Likewise, Sexagesima, Quinquagesima, and Quadragesima mean "sixtieth," "fiftieth," and "fortieth" respectively. The significance of this naming (according to Andrew Hughes, Medieval Manuscripts for Mass and Office [Toronto, 1982], 10) is as follows: "Septuagesima Sunday [is] so called because it falls within seventy days but more than sixty days before Easter. The next Sunday is within sixty, Sexagesima, and the next within fifty, Quinquagesima ... Falling within forty days of Easter (excluding Sundays) the next Sunday is Quadragesima." Because every Sunday recalls the resurrection of Christ, they are considered "little Easters" and not treated as days of penance. Quadragesima serves as the Latin word for the season of Lent, which (not counting Sundays) is forty days long.

Amalarius of Metz would have the name indicate a period of seventy days made up of the nine weeks to Easter plus Easter Week, which would mystically represent the seventy-year Babylonian captivity. He wrote, "for as the Jews were obliged to do penance seventy years, that they might thereby merit to return into the promised land, so Christians sought to regain the grace of God by fasting for seventy days."

According to the First Council of Orleans, "many pious ecclesiastics and lay persons of the primitive Church used to fast seventy days before Easter, and their fast was called, therefore, Septuagesima, a name which was afterwards retained to distinguish this Sunday from others."

Septuagesima was also the day on which one could begin a forty-day Lenten fast that excluded from its observance Thursdays, Saturdays, and Sundays.

== Devotional and liturgical practices ==
Dates for Septuagesima, 2023–2029
Year	Date
2023	February 5
2024	January 28
2025	February 16
2026	February 1
2027	January 24
2028	February 13
2029	January 28

The 17-day period beginning on Septuagesima Sunday was intended to be observed as a preparation for the season of Lent, which is itself a period of spiritual preparation (for Easter). In many countries, however, Septuagesima Sunday marked and still marks the traditional start of the carnival season, culminating on Shrove Tuesday, sometimes known as Mardi Gras.

In the pre-1970 Roman Rite liturgy, the Alleluia ceases to be said during the liturgy. At first Vespers of Septuagesima Sunday, two alleluias are added to the closing verse of Benedicamus Domino and its response, Deo gratias, as during the Easter Octave, and, starting at Compline, it is no longer used until Easter. Likewise, violet vestments are worn, except on feasts, from Septuagesima Sunday until Holy Thursday. As during Advent and Lent, the Gloria and Te Deum are no longer said on Sundays.

The readings at Matins for this week are the first few chapters of Genesis, telling of the creation of the world, of Adam and Eve, the fall of man and resulting expulsion from the Garden of Eden, and the story of Cain and Abel. In the following weeks before and during Lent, the readings continue to Noah, Abraham, Isaac, Jacob, and Moses. The Gospel reading for Septuagesima week is the parable of the Workers in the Vineyard (Matthew 20:1-16).

== Catholic usage after 1969 ==
The liturgical books for the Ordinary Form of the Roman Rite revised after the Second Vatican Council omit Septuagesima, Sexagesima and Quinquagesima Sundays, which are found in the earlier versions, and treat this period as part of Ordinary Time, so that the use of violet vestments and the omission of "Alleluia" in the liturgy do not begin until Ash Wednesday.

The Ordinariate Form and Extraordinary Form of the Roman Rite have retained the Pre-Lenten season and its traditional observances.

== Lutheran usage ==
While Lutherans who adopted a three-year lectionary modeled on that of the Roman Catholic Church eliminated the season of Septuagesima and instead observe an extended Epiphanytide, Lutherans who retained the traditional calendar have continued to observe Septuagesima. The following antiphon, drawn from Psalm 137, is traditionally appointed in Lutheran use for the Saturday before Septuagesima:

Hymnum cantate nobis, Alleluia, de canticis Sion, Alleluia, Quomodo cantabimus canticum Domini in terra aliena? Alleluia, septuaginta annos super flumina Babylonis sedimus et flevimus, dum recordaremur Sion, Alleluia, ibi suspendimus organa nostra, Alleluia. Gloria Patri...

Sing us a hymn, Alleluia, one of the songs of Zion, Alleluia, How shall we sing the Lord's song in a strange land? Alleluia, seventy years we sat by the rivers of Babylon and wept when we remembered Zion, Alleluia, there we hung our harps, Alleluia. Glory be to the Father...

Beginning at First Vespers of Septuagesima, Alleluia is not said again until the Easter Vigil, and the Gloria is not said on Sundays.

== Anglican usage ==
Most provinces of the Anglican Communion adopted the same change. In the Church of England these Sundays retain their original designations where the Prayer Book Calendar is followed, but in the Common Worship Calendar they have been subsumed into a pre-Lent season of variable length, with anything from zero to five "Sundays before Lent" depending on the date of Easter. Churches in the Episcopal and Continuing Anglican movement that use the 1928 Book of Common Prayer (or the various missals based upon it) also observe Septuagesima.

== Polish National Catholic Church usage ==
The Polish National Catholic Church has officially reinstated the Septuagesima, Sexagesima, and Quinquagesima Sundays in 2014 throughout the entire Church. The celebration of this season as a preparation for Holy Lent is now highlighted as a part of the Liturgical Year.

== Eastern usage ==
A pre-Lent season also exists in the Eastern Orthodox and Byzantine Catholic liturgical calendar, and is found in the liturgical book known as the Triódion (which continues to Easter Even). It is 22 days long because it begins on the Sunday before Septuagesima, but not 24 since the Byzantine Lent commences on a Monday instead of a Wednesday.

The Sunday of the Prodigal Son is Eastern Orthodox equivalent of Western Septuagesima.

== In popular culture ==
In 1894, Oscar Wilde told the actor Charles Brookfield, who had complained about Wilde's conducting rehearsals for his play An Ideal Husband on Christmas Day, "the only festival of the Church I keep is Septuagesima".

== See also ==
- Ordinary Time
- Alleluia, dulce carmen
- Three Sundays of Commemoration

Sundays of the Easter cycle
First	Septuagesima; February 1, 2026	Succeeded by Sexagesima
