= Healing the blind near Jericho =

Miracle carried out by Jesus according to the Bible

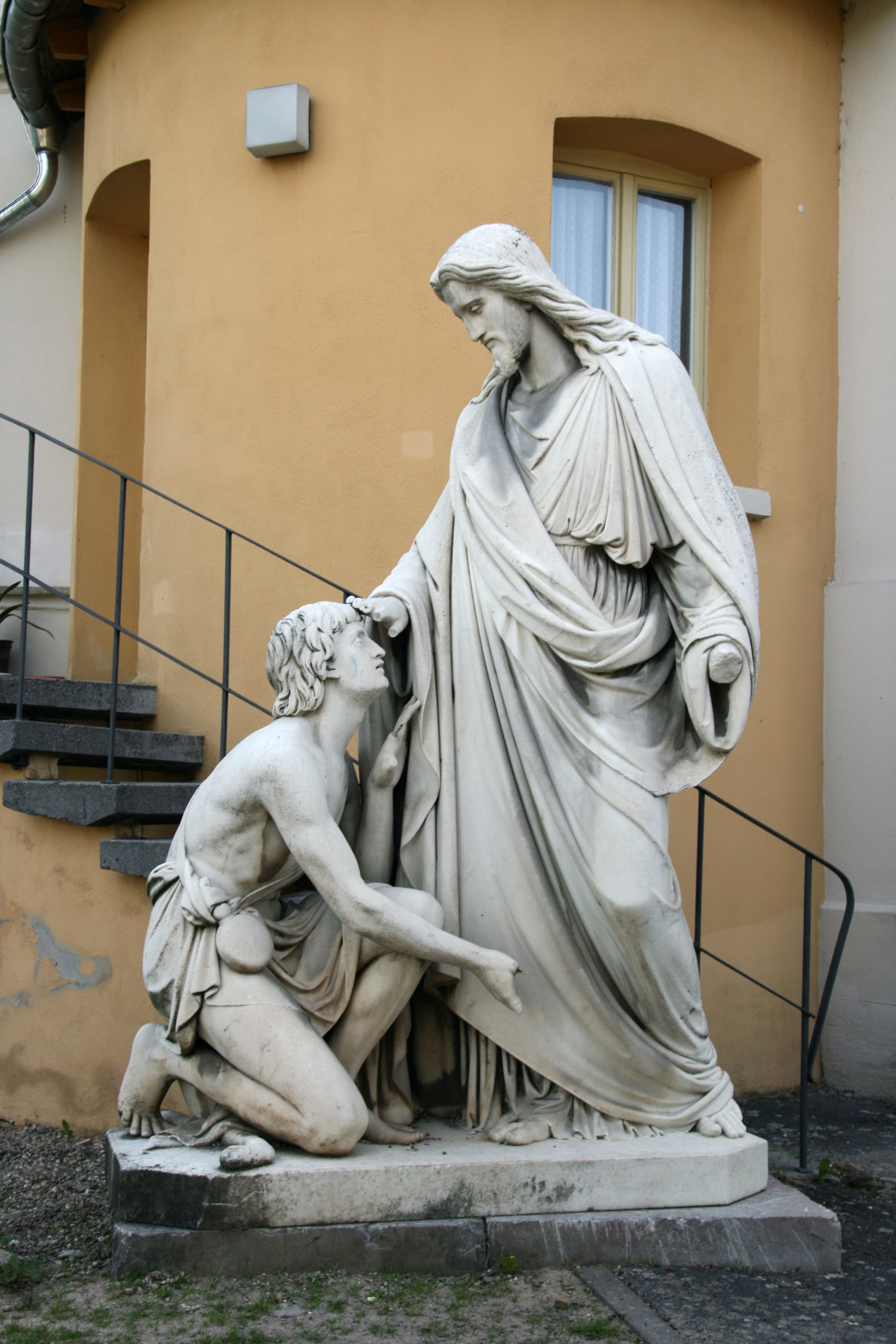
Jesus healing blind Bartimaeus, by Johann Heinrich Stöver, 1861

Each of the three Synoptic Gospels tells of Jesus healing the blind near Jericho, as he passed through that town, shortly before his passion.

The Gospel of Mark tells of the curing of a man named Bartimaeus, healed by Jesus as he is leaving Jericho. The Gospel of Matthew and the Gospel of Luke use Mark’s account while reporting the same event.

== Narrative ==
The Gospel of Mark (10:46–52) tells of the curing of a blind beggar named Bartimaeus (literally "Son of Timaeus"). He is one of the few recipients of healing whose name is provided in the Gospels. As Jesus is leaving Jericho with his followers, Bartimaeus calls out: 'Son of David, have mercy on me!' and persists even though the crowd tries to silence him. Jesus has them bring the man to him and asks him what he wants; he asks to be able to see. Jesus tells him that his faith has cured him; he immediately receives his sight and follows Jesus.

Apart from telling a miracle story that shows the power of Jesus, the author of the Gospel uses this story to advance a clearly theological purpose. It shows a character who understands who Jesus is and the proper way to respond to him – with faith. The beggar, on being called to Jesus, discards his cloak, symbolizing the leaving behind of possessions. And the use of the title 'Son of David' – the only occasion on which this is used in the Gospel of Mark – serves to identify Jesus as the Messiah. It was also a reference to Jesus' kingly authority, which the Jews would have seen as placing him at odds with Caesar. The emperor was the perceived proper referent of the call of kyrie eleison, as he would have been referred to as kyrios in Greek ('lord' in English).

The Gospel of Matthew and the Gospel of Luke use Mark’s account while reporting the same event. The Gospel of Matthew has two unnamed blind men, sitting by the roadside, as the gospel tends to double where other gospels present one figure, though it uses Mark more conservatively than other historical biographies of the period; Jesus is 'moved by compassion' and touches their eyes. 20:29–34 A version of the same story is told earlier in the narrative, when Jesus is preaching in Galilee. On this occasion, he asks the blind men if they believe he can cure them, and when they assure him that they do, he commends their faith and touches their eyes, restoring their sight. He warns them to tell nobody of this, but they go and spread the news throughout the district. (Matthew 9:27–31)

In Gospel of Luke 18:35–43 there is one unnamed blind man, and the incident takes place as Jesus is approaching Jericho so it can lead into the story of Zacchaeus.

== Son of David ==
Vernon K. Robbins emphasizes that the healing of Bartimaeus is the last of Jesus’ healings in Mark, and links Jesus' earlier teaching about the suffering and death of the Son of Man with his Son of David activity in Jerusalem. The story blends the Markan emphasis on the disciples' 'blindness' – their inability to understand the nature of Jesus' messiahship – with the necessity of following Jesus into Jerusalem, where his suffering and death make him recognizable to Gentiles as Son of God (see Mark 15:39 where, at the crucifixion, the Roman centurion says "surely this man was son of God").

Paula Fredriksen, who believes that titles such as "Son of David" were applied to Jesus only after the crucifixion and resurrection, argued that Mark and Matthew placed that healing with the proclamation "Son of David!" just before "Jesus' departure for Jerusalem, the long-foreshadowed site of his sufferings." The title "Son of David" is a messianic name. Thus, Bartimaeus' exclamation was, according to Mark, the first public acknowledgement of the Christ, after St. Peter's private confession at Mark 8:27–30.

== Bartimaeus ==
The naming of Bartimaeus is unusual in several respects: (a) the fact that a name is given at all, (b) the strange Semitic-Greek hybrid, with (c) an explicit translation "Son of Timaeus." Some scholars see this as confirmation of a reference to a historical person; however, other scholars see a special significance of the story in the figurative reference to Plato's Timaeus who delivers Plato's most important cosmological and theological treatise, involving sight as the foundation of knowledge.

== See also ==
- Healing the man blind from birth
- Life of Jesus in the New Testament
- Ministry of Jesus
- Parables of Jesus
- The Blind Man of Bethsaida
