= Mainz Rose Monday parade =

Carnival parade held in Mainz

The Mainz Rose Monday parade is a carnival parade held annually on Rose Monday in Mainz. Since its inception in 1838, it has taken place 114 times (as of 2015) and is considered the highlight of the Mainz Carnival. With approximately 9,500 active participants and over 500,000 spectators, the Mainz Rose Monday Parade, alongside the Cologne and Düsseldorf Rose Monday Parades, is one of the three largest Rose Monday parades in Germany. Due to its excessive length and duration, the MCV announced a reduction for 2026.

== History ==
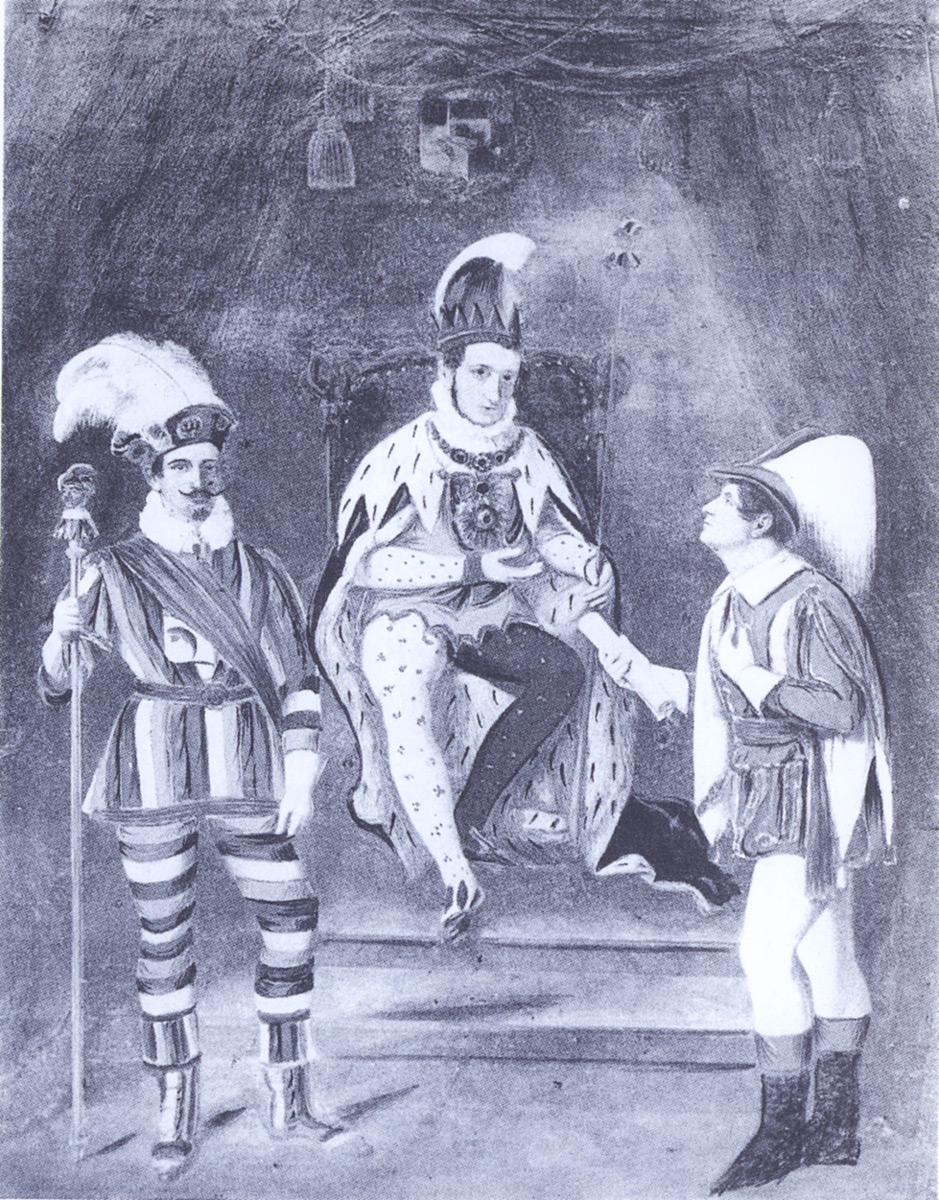
Prince Carneval and his entourage. MCV members (left: Carl Michael, founding president) in 1838, the year the club was founded.

The Mainz Rose Monday Parade has a history spanning over 170 years. Its origins date back to the Biedermeier period. At that time, Mainz was a federal fortress occupied alternately by Prussian and Austrian troops, and the reorganisation of carnival celebrations, which had primarily taken place in Cologne and Düsseldorf, began to influence Mainz. The parade was interrupted mainly in the 20th century due to the two World Wars.

=== Precursor parade ===
As early as 1837, Mainz craftsman Nikolaus Krieger organised the first so-called Krähwinkler Landsturm, the first carnival parade in Mainz. The literary inspiration for these events, which became fashionable in the first third of the 19th century (e.g., in Basel in 1822 and Speyer in 1831), was the play Die deutschen Kleinstädter (The Little Town People) by dramatist August von Kotzebue. Krähwinkel, a small town described in the play, was at that time the epitome of stupidity and narrow-mindedness. The Krähwinkler Landsturm parodied these characteristics, as well as the narrow-mindedness of the Biedermeier period and the military with its uniforms and drills. Today, it is generally regarded as the birth of organised carnival in Mainz and the direct precursor to the Rose Monday Parade, which took place the following year.

The Krähwinkler Landsturm displayed typical characteristics of Mainz street carnival, including a 15-strong, uniformed militia led by a "Fähnrich Rummelbuff" (standard bearer) and the central figure of "Held Carneval" (later known as "Prinz Carneval"). The parade was a huge success with the people of Mainz. Several hundred participants, two floats, and the carnival guard in their uniforms caused quite a stir. Contemporary chronicles noted, "Thanks to the organisers of this wonderful parade. Never has there been so much laughter as there was at this magnificent composition of whimsy and its successful execution."

=== 1838 birth ===
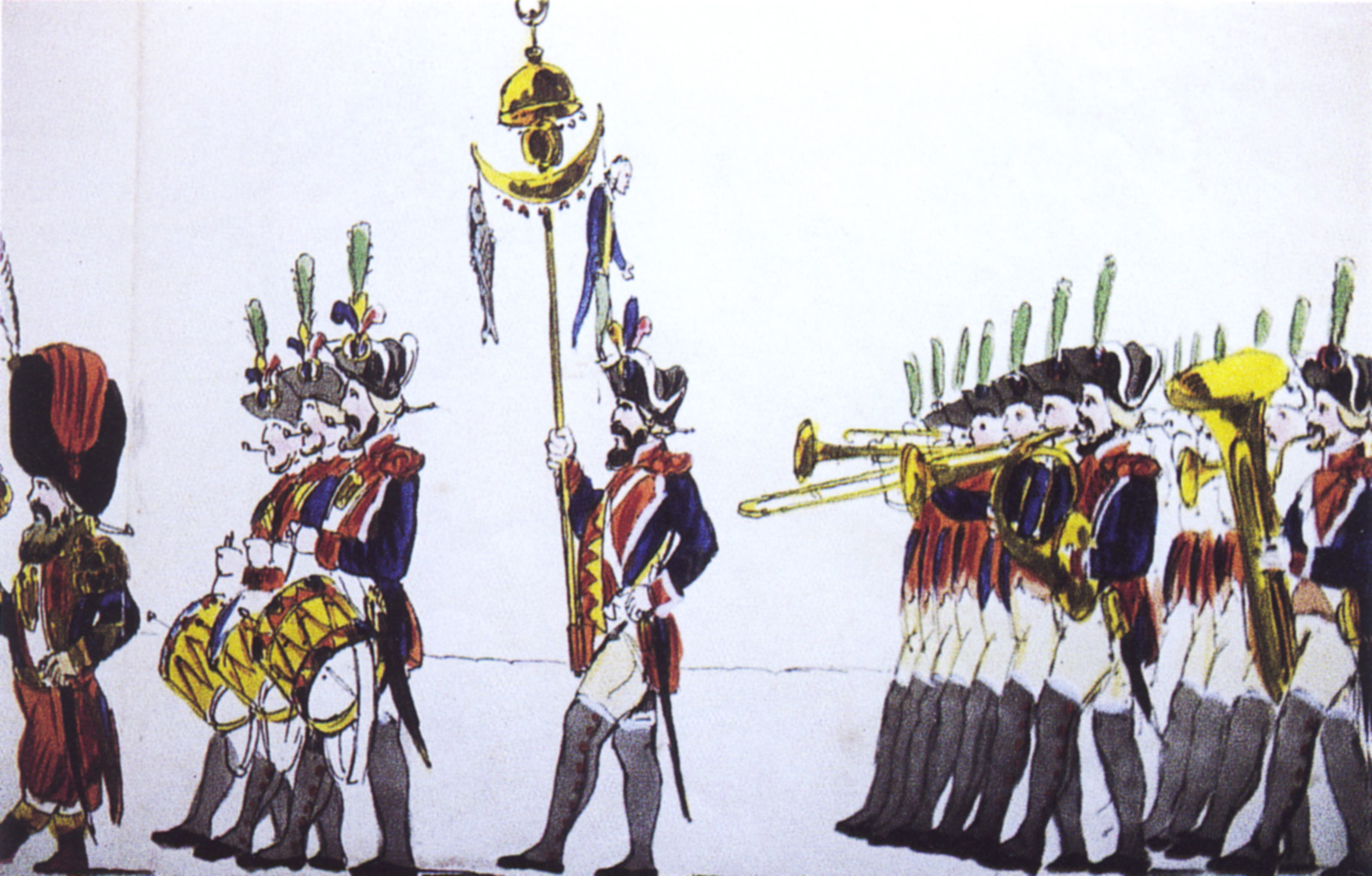
The Mainz Ranzengarde on a leporello from 1857

Following the success of 1837, committed citizens, led by Mainz merchant, city councillor, and state parliament member Johann Maria Kertell, along with the newly founded Mainz Carnival Association, organised a masked parade on Shrove Monday, 26 February 1838. Several important actions preceded this event. On 19 January 1838, a committee of Mainz citizens drafted statutes for a carnival association. They requested approval from the Grand Ducal Hessian Provincial Commissioner of Lichtenberg, with over 100 applicants signing the application. One main objective was to "celebrate Carnival in a more orderly and refined manner than has been the case in this city to date, in homage to the god Jocus." Approval was granted on 22 January, suggesting prior arrangements with the authorities. The Mainzer Carneval-Verein (MCV) was established. The first general meeting took place on 25 January, followed by further meetings. On 9 February, President Carl Georg Michel applied for permission to hold a Shrove Monday parade, which was promptly granted.

Two Mainz chair manufacturers, the city administration, and the military authorities provided 100 carriages. The carnival militia from the previous year became the Mainzer Ranzengarde, with 37 members and their general, Johann Maria Kertell, now appearing in electoral uniforms from the time of Elector Friedrich Karl Joseph von Erthal. They, along with the "Zwergen-Compagnie" (dwarf company) of costumed children, provided the military escort for the procession and were considered the bodyguards of Held Carneval.

Heralds of the prince on horseback led the procession, followed by the Ranzengarde, flag bearers, and the Ranzengarde in their new uniforms, many with stuffed bellies and long braids. (Note: The name “Ranzengarde” comes from “Ranzen,” which is slang for “big belly” in the Mainz dialect. It was a satirical reference to the “tall guys” of Prussian King Frederick II. Only those with a waist circumference of at least six feet, or who could achieve this with the help of cushions, were allowed to join the guard.) Held Carneval resided with his court on the accompanying carriages. The parade proceeded from the riding arena via Schlossplatz and Große Bleiche to the market square, where Held Carneval was ceremoniously enthroned and crowned king, receiving the homage of Mainz citizens. For the first time, a flag consecration ceremony and a recruit oath were held at the Ranzengarde, which remain typical elements of Mainz street carnival today. The first proper Mainz carnival campaign ended with a cap ride to the Neue Anlage.

=== 1839–1933 ===
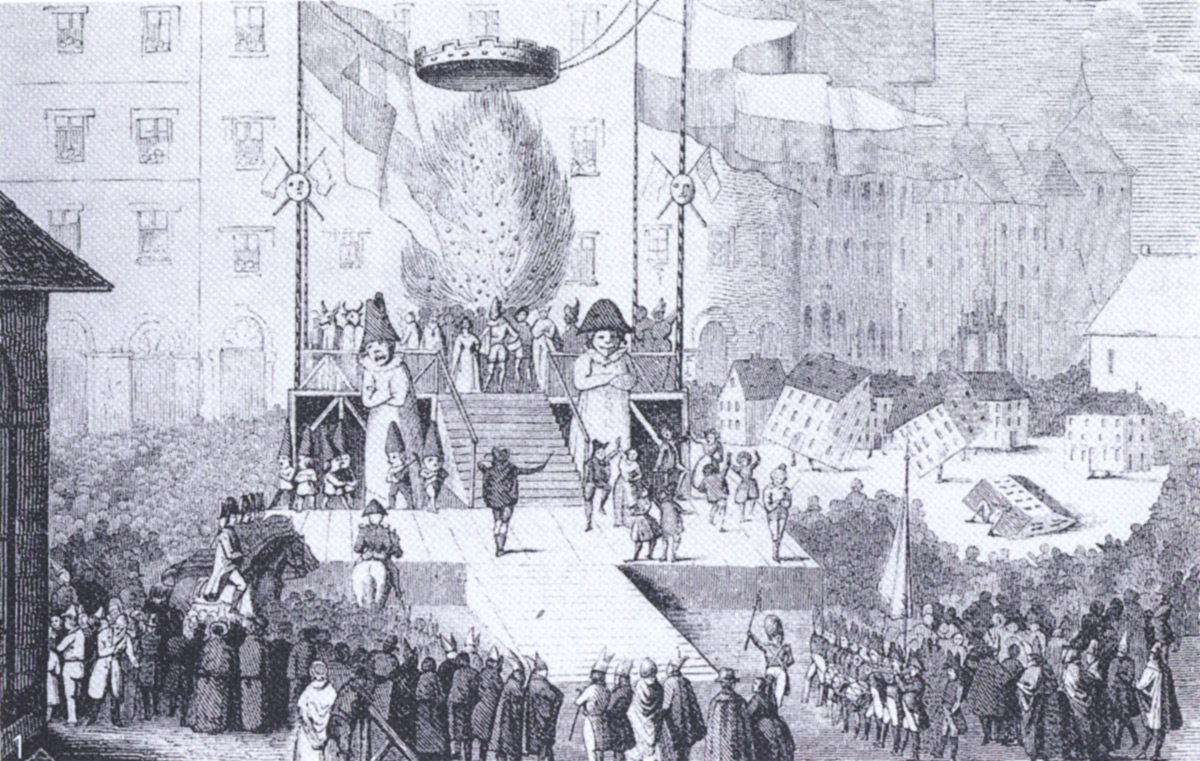
Stage production based on the Rose Monday Parade of 1845

The next two Rose Monday Parades in 1839 and 1840 were thematically linked to the 1838 parade. While Held Carneval was enthroned in 1838, the 1839 parade celebrated his wedding, and 1840 marked the birth of their son, Hanswurst. By 1842, however, the parades began reflecting current issues of the politically turbulent Vormärz period. The Mainz carnival became more political, with new carnivalists like Ludwig Kalisch, Franz Heinrich Zitz (MCV president from 1843), and Eduard Reis driving the emergence of a political and literary Mainz carnival.

In 1845, the parade drew attention from authorities in Darmstadt. The Minister of the Interior of the Grand Duchy of Hesse-Darmstadt called for "more official attention and vigilance" toward the parade. In 1846, censorship was symbolically burned on the Mainz market square during the parade. Despite tensions, relations between the MCV and local Mainz authorities remained good, with the provincial commissioner of Lichtenberg and acting mayor Nikolaus Nack preventing bans from Darmstadt.

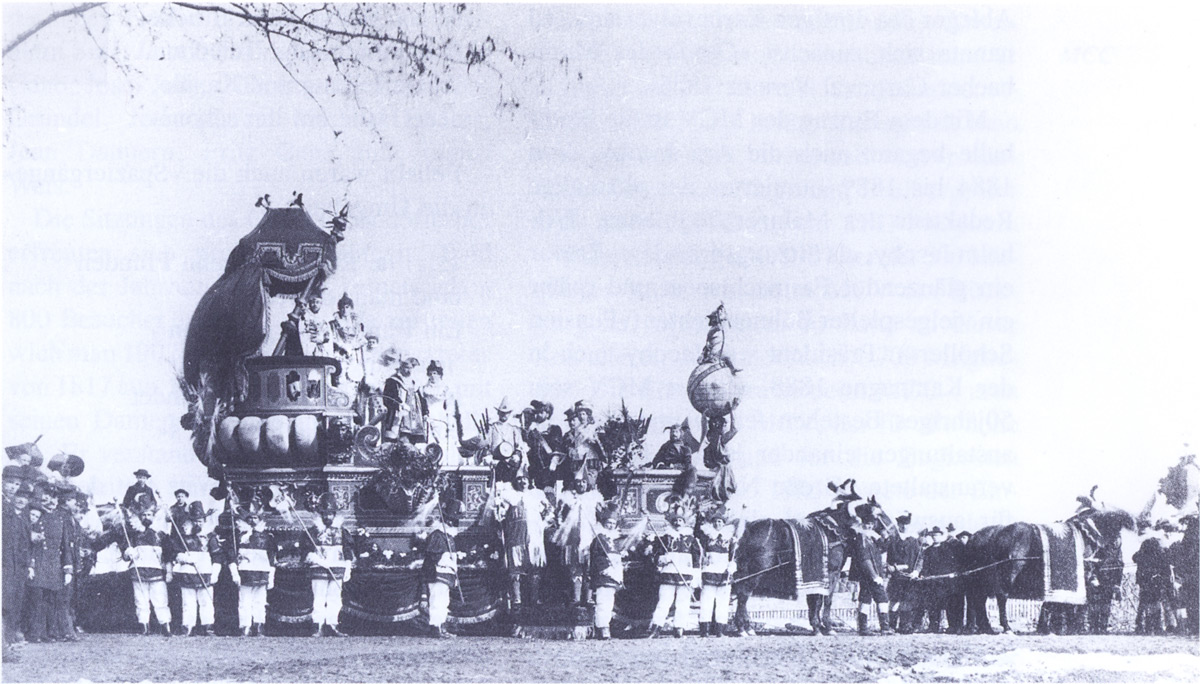
The prince's carriage from the Rose Monday Parade in 1886

In 1856, Mainz's carnival celebrations and the Rose Monday Parade were revived, drawing on the successful early years. The Mainzer Klepper-Garde, founded that year, participated as the second guard of the street carnival. In 1863, the parade was planned to be particularly magnificent to mark the 25th anniversary of the organised carnival in Mainz. However, offensive carnival speeches led the Prussian garrison commander to withdraw bands and horses, threatening cancellation. The Grand Duke of Hesse-Darmstadt provided bands and horses, allowing the parade to proceed. The German-Danish War in 1864 and subsequent political events, including the Prussian-Austrian War, along with a lack of funds, caused a long break in the parade until 1884.

The parade survived this hiatus and, starting in 1884, experienced a new boom. The construction of the new Stadthalle (city hall) in 1884, then the largest festival hall in Germany, boosted indoor carnival celebrations. Floats became larger and more elaborate, with structures designed by architects and sculptors reaching heights of up to 6 meters. In 1888, the 50th anniversary of the MCV was celebrated with a professionally organised parade. Members of the Grand Ducal family watched from the balcony of the Deutschhaus. The 1913 parade, marking the MCV's 75th anniversary, was the largest to date, with 100,000 visitors, including 40,000 from outside Mainz. Grand Duke Ernst Ludwig, Grand Duchess Eleonore, and a 25-strong entourage watched from the Erthaler Hof balcony.

The First World War and the occupation of the Rhineland, including Mainz, by French troops halted the parade until 1926. In 1927, the Rose Monday Parade resumed to great acclaim, with the regional and interregional tourism industry promoting Mainz Carnival.

=== Nazi control ===
The Rose Monday Parade on 27 February 1933 was largely free from external political influence. However, the Reichstag fire that evening changed Germany's political landscape. From spring 1933, the Mainz carnival was brought under political control through the Gleichschaltungsgesetze (enforced conformity laws) enacted on 31 March and 7 April 1933. By year's end, the Nazi organisation Kraft durch Freude (Strength Through Joy) controlled Shrove Tuesday in Mainz, including the parade, which was valued as an economic factor. Visitors were transported to Mainz from across the German Reich.

The 1934 parade's motto was "Mir könne wieder lache" (We can laugh again). Floats depicted the "evil St. Nicholas" putting naughty children (representing Social Democrats and Centre Party members) into a brown inkwell. Street sweepers drove under the slogan "Es werd' weiter gesäubert" (The cleaning continues), a clear Nazi propaganda threat. By 1935, with the motto "Alles unner ääner Kapp" (Everything under one cap), the parade was fully under Nazi control. In 1936, a float referenced the Dachau concentration camp, warning, "The moral of the story: Keep your mouth shut and don't complain!" Another float addressed the anti-Semitic "Mainz wine fraud trials," depicting Jewish wine merchants with an oversized wine barrel bearing a Star of David, labelled "Han mer auch Eintopf gemacht" (We've made stew too), and text stating, "Foreigners have seriously damaged German trade by acting in this way."

=== After the Second World War ===
The Rose Monday Parade was revived in 1950, attracting 300,000 visitors with over 100 floats. Financing was supported by a 10,000 DM grant from the city and the sale of 100,000 Zugplakettchen (parade badges). Themes included the political situation in Berlin and the separation of Mainz districts on the right bank of the Rhine post-Second World War.

Post-war parades occurred annually, except in 1991 (due to the Second Gulf War), 2016 (due to storm warnings from the German Weather Service), and 2021 (due to the coronavirus pandemic). Some 2016 floats participated in a modified parade on 8 May for the 200th anniversary of Rheinhessen. The annually changing parade theme, introduced in the 1920s, became a fixture. In 1963, the MCV celebrated its 125th anniversary. In 1988, marking 150 years, a tragic accident occurred when a child was fatally injured by a float, leading to tightened safety regulations. The 100th parade took place in 2001.

In 2023, following cancellations in 2021 and 2022 due to the pandemic, the parade saw a record 600,000 spectators.

== Organisation ==
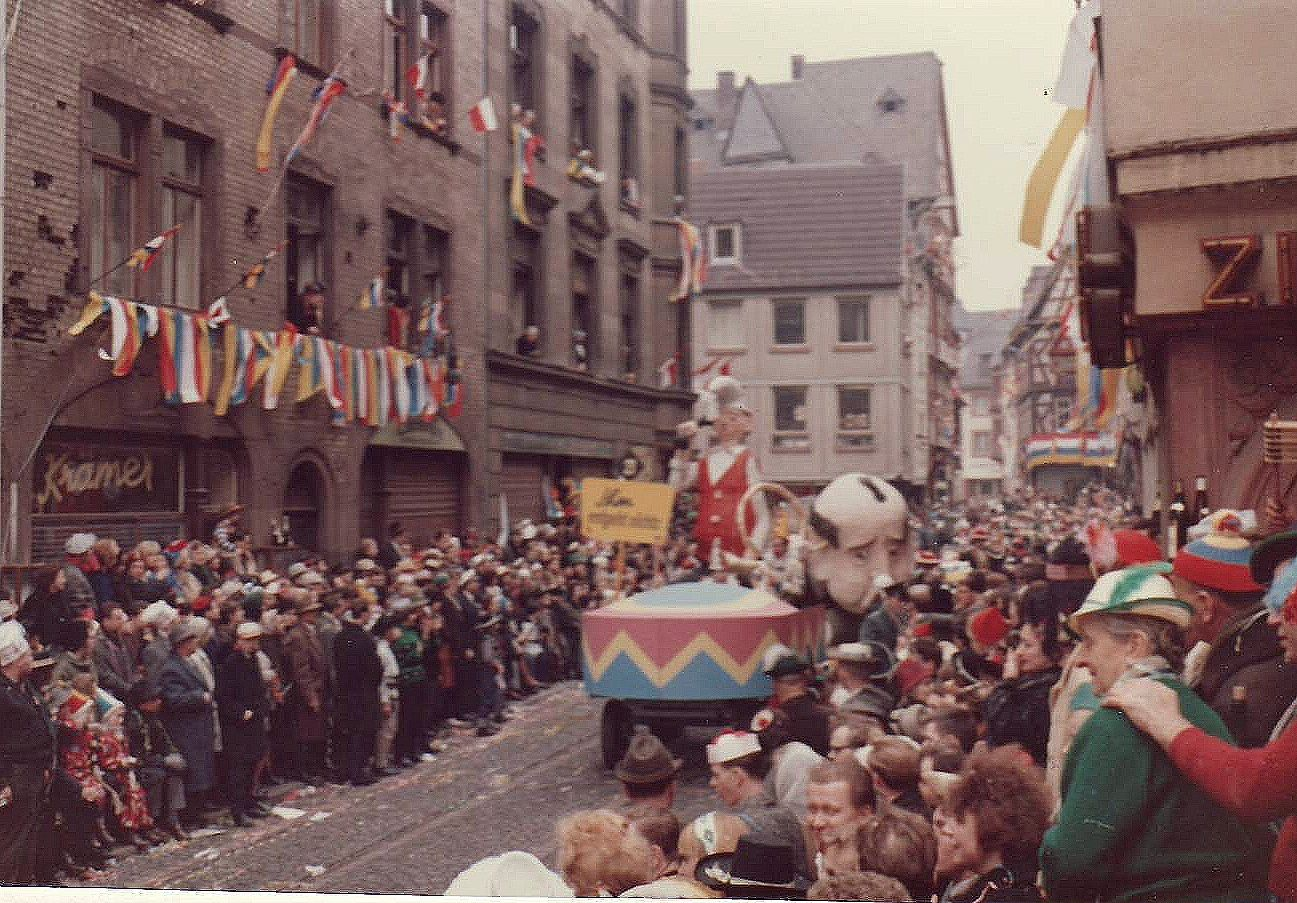
Mainz Rose Monday Parade in 1962 on Augustinerstraße

Since 1838, the Mainz Carnival Association (MCV) has been responsible for organising, financing, and staging the parade. An organising committee, known as the parade management, oversees operations, with a parade marshal participating in the parade.

=== Preparation and operation ===
The 26-member parade committee prepares for the parade over six months, handling schedules, budgets, club invitations, applications, and contracts. Float planning begins before 1 January, with themes decided for 15 large floats built in the MCV's hall in the Mombach district. The parade order is announced in January, and assembly points in Mainz's Neustadt district are assigned, ensuring emergency access routes.

Vehicles are inspected by TÜV Rheinland, and the parade management ensures compliance with legal regulations, including liability insurance and reporting musical contributions to GEMA. Final preparations include a meeting with the organisers and the Mainz police and a press conference.

The parade marshal, supported by 52 assistants, manages the parade. Ady M. Schmelz served from 1994 to 2010, followed by Jürgen Schmidt and Kay-Uwe Schreiber in 2011–2012, and Schreiber alone from 2013. Markus Perabo has been the parade marshal since 2016. Approximately 1,400 additional personnel, including municipal employees, police, firefighters, doctors, and medical services, support the parade.

=== Distance travelled ===
Since 1838, the parade has followed 35 different routes. The route changed in 1995 due to safety concerns from increasing visitor numbers, particularly in Augustinerstraße. The current 7 km route, taking 4 hours, starts in Mainz Neustadt and proceeds through Kaiserstraße, the main railway station, Christuskirche, Bauhofstraße, Große Bleiche, Große Langgasse, Ludwigsstraße, Gutenbergplatz, the theatre, Höfchen, Mainz Cathedral, Rheinstraße, Holzhofstraße, Weißliliengasse, Schillerplatz, the Fastnachtsbrunnen fountain, Schillerstraße, and disperses at Münsterplatz.

The parade requires approval from the Mainz traffic authority per § 29 StVO, as it involves roads used beyond customary traffic.

=== Financing and parade badges ===
The parade costs approximately €360,000 to stage, funded solely by the MCV through sponsors, advertising, and carnival meeting revenue, as the city no longer provides subsidies. Since 1950, Zuchplakettcher (parade badges) have been sold to secure funding. Adam Krautkrämer produced the first badges, featuring a Bajazz with a lantern and marotte. These plastic figures, with new motifs annually, raised approximately £200,000 in 2007 from 50,000 sales. In 2008, the three-millionth badge was sold.

Klaus Eigenbrodt, known as "Plaketten-Klaus," sold badges for over 50 years, with the saying:

Every year it's the same old story, money is tight, the parade is expensive. So, buy a badge, a pretty one, so you can see the parade. Plaketten-Klaus

=== Composition and participants ===
Number of Parade participants	2023	2015	2013	1997
Total Number of participants	9202	9571	9714	8450
Parade Groups	137	158	N/A	208
Guards	N/A	N/A	21	25
Clubs	N/A	N/A	49	15
Groups	N/A	N/A	32	N/A
Music Groups	Approx. 40	87	21	95
Total Number of Musicians	2012	2565	2966	3100
Flag and Schwellkopf Bearers	92	71	90	100
Riders	51	160	178	200
Floats	164	160	155	120
Of which Themed Floats	10	13	15	15

The parade includes nearly 9,500 participants from Germany and abroad, divided into almost 150 groups, with around 3,000 musicians. All Mainz carnival groups participate, led by the Mainz Ranzengarde since 1838. Large guards include foot troops, cadet corps, cavalry corps, music, fanfare, or drum corps, and vehicles. Carnival guards and marching bands from southern Germany and Guggenmusik groups from southern Germany and Switzerland join, often participating from Shrove Saturday.

Other participants include the MCV, Mainzer Carneval Club (MCC), Mainzer Narren-Club (MNC), Karneval Club Kastell (KCK), carnival clubs, regulars' tables, small groups, SWR, ZDF, Mainz Bakers' Guild, Mainz Butchers' Guild, and 1. FSV Mainz 05. Group sizes vary, from a one-man guard to the 600-member Mainz-Gonsenheim Fusilier Guard in 2023.

== Media coverage ==
Since 1838, the parade has received significant media attention. In 1845, the Leipziger Illustrirte Zeitung published an illustrated report. In 1910, the parade was filmed and shown in cinemas. Radio broadcasts began in the 1920s, and since 1954, SWR has televised the parade. ZDF broadcast live from Mainz starting in the mid-1990s but withdrew in 2007. In 2000, one in three television viewers watched the live broadcast on ARD or ZDF, with 1.41 million on ZDF and 1.72 million on ARD.

== Bibliography ==
- Carneval-Verein, Mainzer, ed. (2001). Ewe kimmt de Zug. Die Geschichte der Mainzer Straßenfastnacht 2001. 100. Rosenmontagszug in Mainz seit 1838 [Here comes the parade. The history of Mainz Street Carnival 2001. 100th Rose Monday Parade in Mainz since 1838] (in German). Mainz, Germany: Eigenverlag. ISBN 3-00-007160-1.
- Schenk, G. (1986). "Als sich zum Prinzen die Prinzessin gesellte. Der Mainzer Rosenmontag im bürgerlichen Zeitalter (1856-1878)" [When the princess joined the prince. Rosenmontag in Mainz during the bourgeois era (1856–1878)]. Mainz. Vierteljahreshefte für Kultur, Politik, Wirtschaft, Geschichte (in German). 6 (1): 6–16. ISSN 0720-5945.
- Schenk, G. (2004). Mainz Helau! Handbuch zur Mainzer Fastnacht [Mainz Helau! Handbook for Mainz Carnival] (in German). Ingelheim, Germany: Leinpfad Verlag. ISBN 3-937782-07-9.
- Schütz, F. (1999). "Mainz. Die Geschichte der Stadt". In Dumont, F.; Scherf, F.; Schütz, F. (eds.). Die moderne Mainzer Fastnacht [Modern carnival in Mainz] (in German) (2 ed.). Mainz, Germany: Philipp von Zabern. pp. 809–834. ISBN 3-8053-2000-0.
