= Carnival in Germany, Switzerland and Austria =

Festivities before Lent

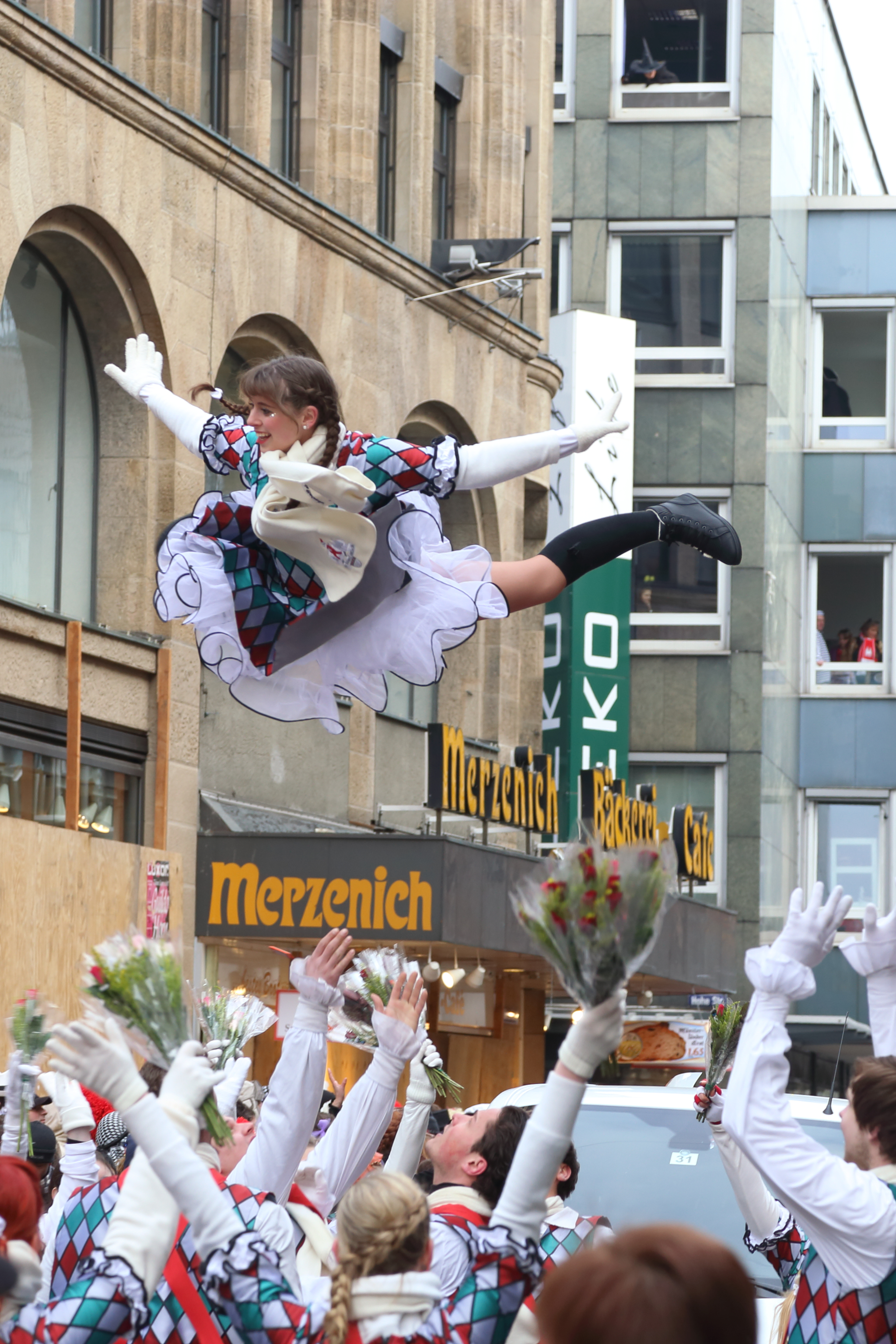
A Funkemariechen (majorette) is tossed in the air at Cologne Carnival.

A variety of customs and traditions are associated with Carnival celebrations in the German-speaking countries of Germany, Switzerland and Austria. They can vary considerably from country to country, but also from one small region to another. This is reflected in the various names given to these festivities occurring before Lent.

== Names ==
In parts of eastern and southern Germany, and in parts of Lower Saxony, as well as in Austria, the carnival is called Fasching. In Franconia and Baden-Württemberg as well as some other parts of Germany, the carnival is called Fas(t)nacht, Fassenacht or Fasnet; in Switzerland, Fasnacht.

While Germany's carnival traditions are mostly celebrated in the predominantly Roman Catholic southern and western parts of the country, the Protestant north traditionally knows a festival under the Low Saxon names Fastelavend [ˈfastl̩ˌɒːvɱ̍t], Fastelabend [ˈfastl̩ˌɒːbm̩t] and Fastlaam (also spelled Fastlom, IPA: [ˈfastl̩ɒːm]). This name has been imported to Denmark as Fastelavn and is related to Vastenoavond in the Low-Saxon-speaking parts of the Netherlands. It is traditionally connected with farm servants or generally young men going from house to house in the villages and collecting sausages, eggs and bacon, which were consumed in a festivity on the same evening. While going from house to house they wore masks and made noise. The old tradition vanished in many places, in other places under influence of German carnival traditions it came to resemble carnival with its parades.

== Beginning and peak of the festival season ==
The carnival season, also known as the "Fifth Season", begins each year on 11 November at 11:11 a.m. and finishes on Ash Wednesday of the following year with the main festivities happening around Rosenmontag (Rose Monday).

Although the festivities and parties start as early as the beginning of January, the actual carnival week starts on the Fat Thursday (Weiberfastnacht) before Ash Wednesday (in Germany). The big German carnival parades are held on the weekend before and especially on Rosenmontag, the day before Shrove Tuesday, and sometimes also on Shrove Tuesday (Faschingsdienstag or Veilchendienstag) itself in the suburbs of larger carnival cities.

== Variations ==
In German-speaking countries, there are essentially two distinct variations of Carnivals: the Rhenish Carnival in the west of Germany, centred on the cities of Cologne, Mainz and Düsseldorf, and the Alemannic or Swabian-Alemannic Fastnacht in Swabia (Southwestern Germany), Switzerland, Alsace and Vorarlberg (Western Austria).

The Rhenish Carnival (Rheinischer Karneval, mainly in the states of North Rhine-Westphalia and Rhineland-Palatinate) is famous for celebrations such as parades and costume balls. Cologne Carnival is the largest and most famous. Cologne, Düsseldorf and Mainz are held in the public media to be Germany's three carnival strongholds, but carnival celebrations are also widespread elsewhere in the Rhineland.

=== Rhineland ===
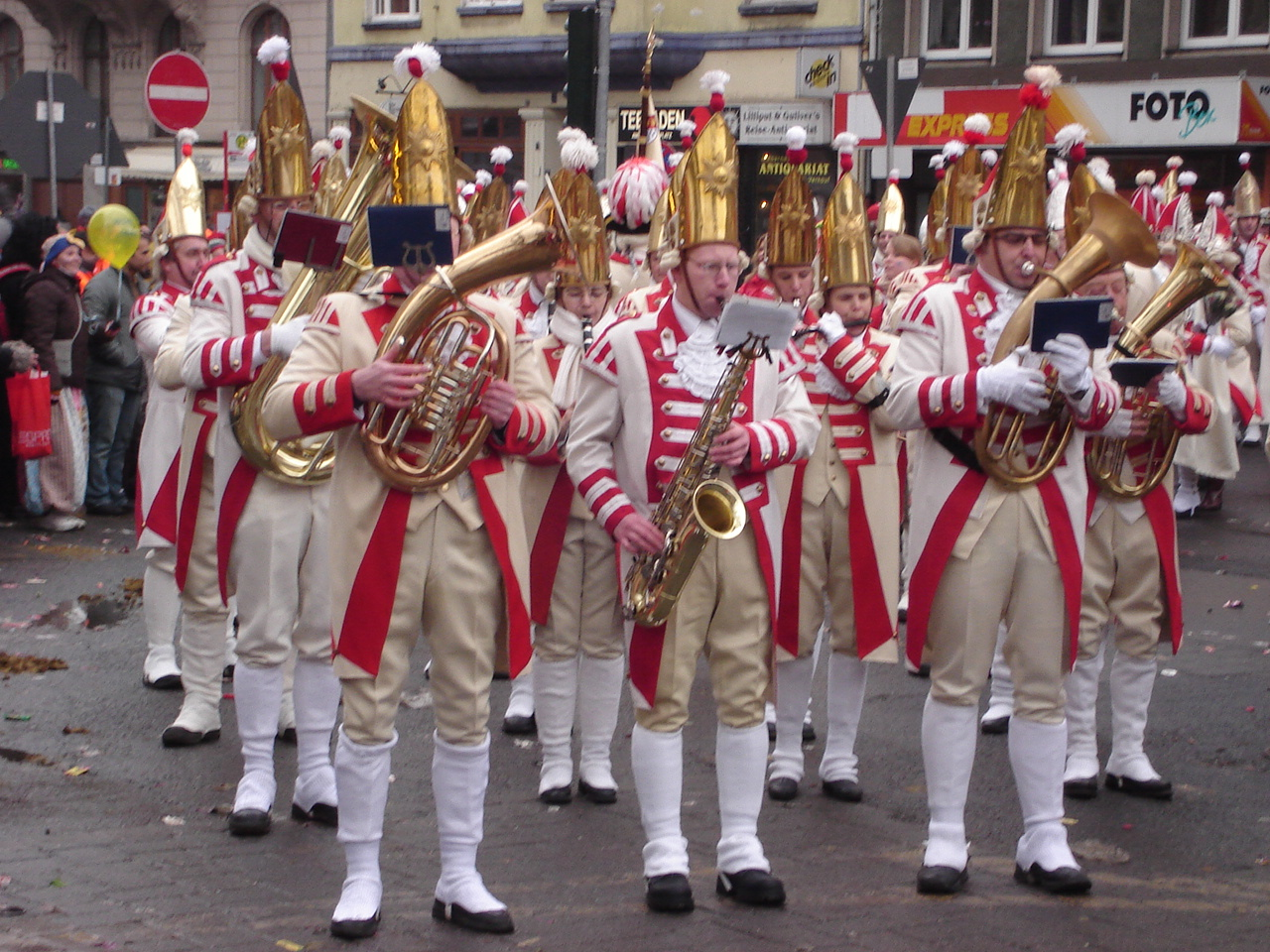
Carnival in Cologne

In the Rhineland festivities developed especially strongly, since it was a way to express subversive anti-Prussian and anti-French thoughts in times of occupation, through parody and mockery. Modern carnival there began in 1823 with the founding of a Carnival Club in Cologne. Most cities and villages of the Rhineland have their own individual carnival traditions. Nationally famous are the carnival in Köln, Düsseldorf and Mainz.

In the Rhineland, the culmination of the carnival around Rosenmontag is considered to be the "fifth season of the year". Clubs organize show events called Sitzung with club members or invited guests performing dance, comedy and songs in costumes. Around Mainz the most frequently performed piece of music during such a "Sitzung" is the "Narrhallamarsch". The committee that organizes the events in each town consists of a president and 10 junior members and is called the "Council of Eleven" or Elferrat. The number eleven, elf in German, is significant in Carneval celebrations because it is an acronym for the French Revolution values of egalité, liberté, fraternité.

The carnival spirit is then temporarily suspended during Advent and Christmas, and picks up again in earnest in the New Year. The time of merrymaking in the streets is officially declared open at the Alter Markt during the Cologne Carnival on the Thursday before the beginning of Lent. The main event is the street carnival that takes place in the period between the Thursday before Ash Wednesday and Ash Wednesday. Carnival Thursday is called Altweiber (Old women day) in Düsseldorf or Wieverfastelovend (The women's day) in Cologne. This celebrates the beginning of the "female presence in carnival", which began in 1824, when washer-women celebrated a "workless day" on the Thursday before carnival. They founded a committee in 1824 to strengthen their presence in the still male-dominated carnival celebrations. In each city, a woman in black storms the city hall to get the "key" for the city-/townhalls from its mayor. In many places "fools" take over city halls or municipal government and "wild" women cut men's ties wherever they get hold of them. Also, as a tradition, women are allowed to kiss every man who passes their way. On the following days, there are parades in the street organized by the local carnival clubs. The highlight of the carnival period however is Rose Monday (Rosenmontag). Although Rose Monday is not an official holiday in the Rhineland, in practice most public life comes to a halt and almost all workplaces are closed. The biggest parades are on Rose Monday, the famous Rosenmontagsumzug (Rose Monday Parade), e.g. in Cologne, Düsseldorf, Mainz, and many other cities. During these events, hundreds of thousands of people celebrate in the streets, even if temperatures are low, most of them dressed up in costumes. Many regions have special carnival cries (Cologne, Bonn and Aachen: Alaaf!; Düsseldorf and Mainz: Helau!). The carnival in the Netherlands is partially derived from the Rhenish carnival.

=== Alemannic Fastnacht ===
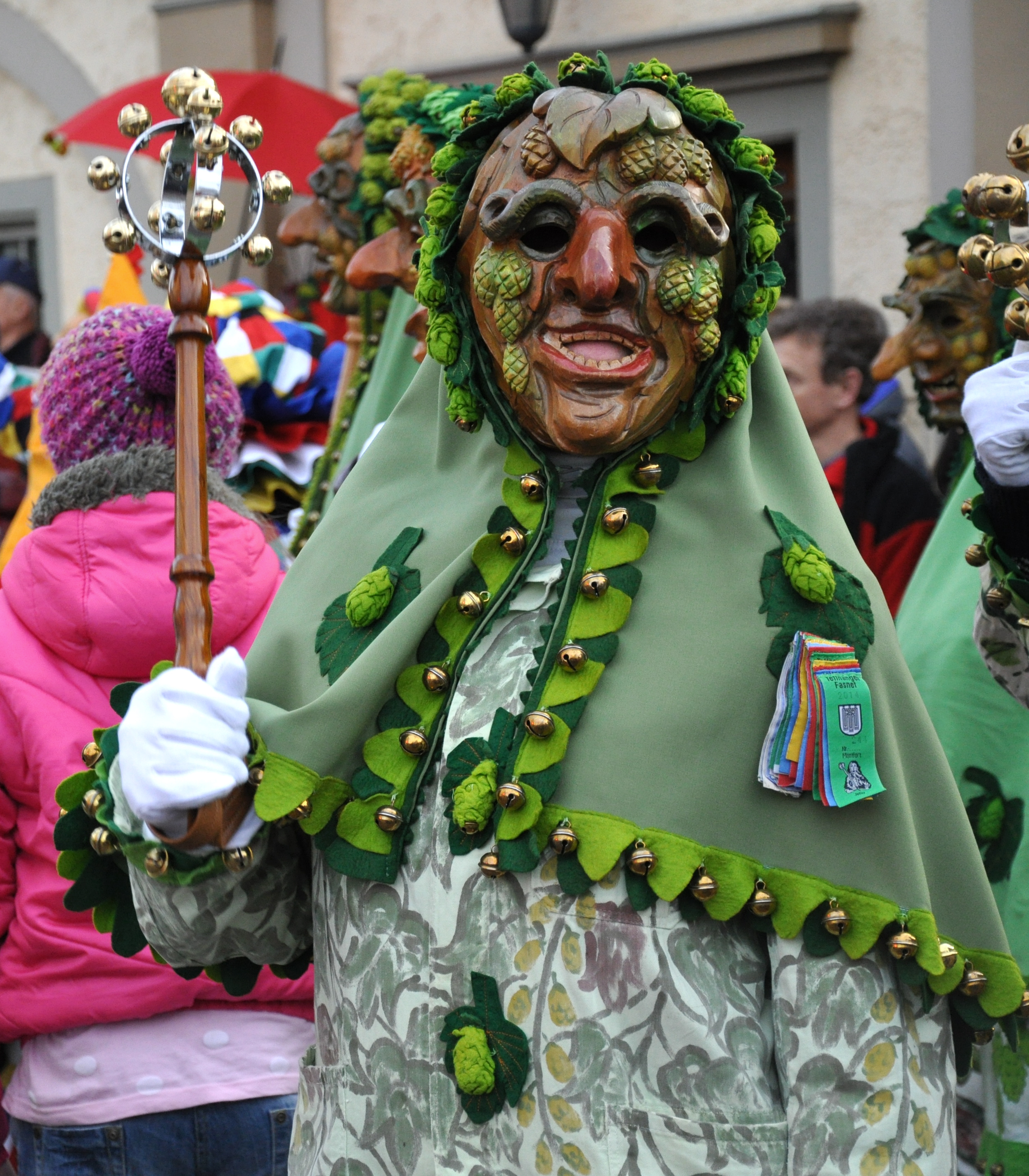
Hopfennarr (hops jester) in Tettnang

The Swabian-Alemannic carnival is known as Fastnacht, where Fast(en)-Nacht means the eve of the Fastenzeit (lent). Variants of the name are Fasnacht, Fasnet, or Fasent.

Fastnacht is held in Baden-Württemberg, parts of Bavaria, Alsace, German Switzerland, and Austrian Vorarlberg. The festival starts on the Thursday before Ash Wednesday, known in these regions as Schmutziger Donnerstag, Schmotziger Donnerstag, Schmutzige-Dunschdig or Fettdonnerstag. In standard German, schmutzig means "dirty", but actually the name is from Alemannic dialects where schmotz means "lard" (Schmalz), or "fat". It continues in some parts with the Shrove Monday, though often differently called, e.g. Güdismontag (literally: Paunch Monday) in Lucerne, and the last day before Ash Wednesday on Fat Tuesday (Mardi Gras), in Lucerne known as Güdisdienstag (literally: Paunch Tuesday), often the most intense Fasnacht day. Also, in Germany, this used to be the time of year at the end of winter when the last of the meat from the previous year was the Schmalz (lard), or rendered fat, and this is consumed before the start of Lent. The name – Fasnacht – in its different variations is the reference to the time before the coming fasting time of Lent. However, in the Protestant Basel, the Basler Fasnacht astonishingly begins on the Monday after Ash Wednesday.

== See also ==
- Carnival (disambiguation)
- Carnival society
- Schembart Carnivalm 15th and 16th century carnival in Nuremberg
