= Nubbel =

Straw doll hung up at carnival

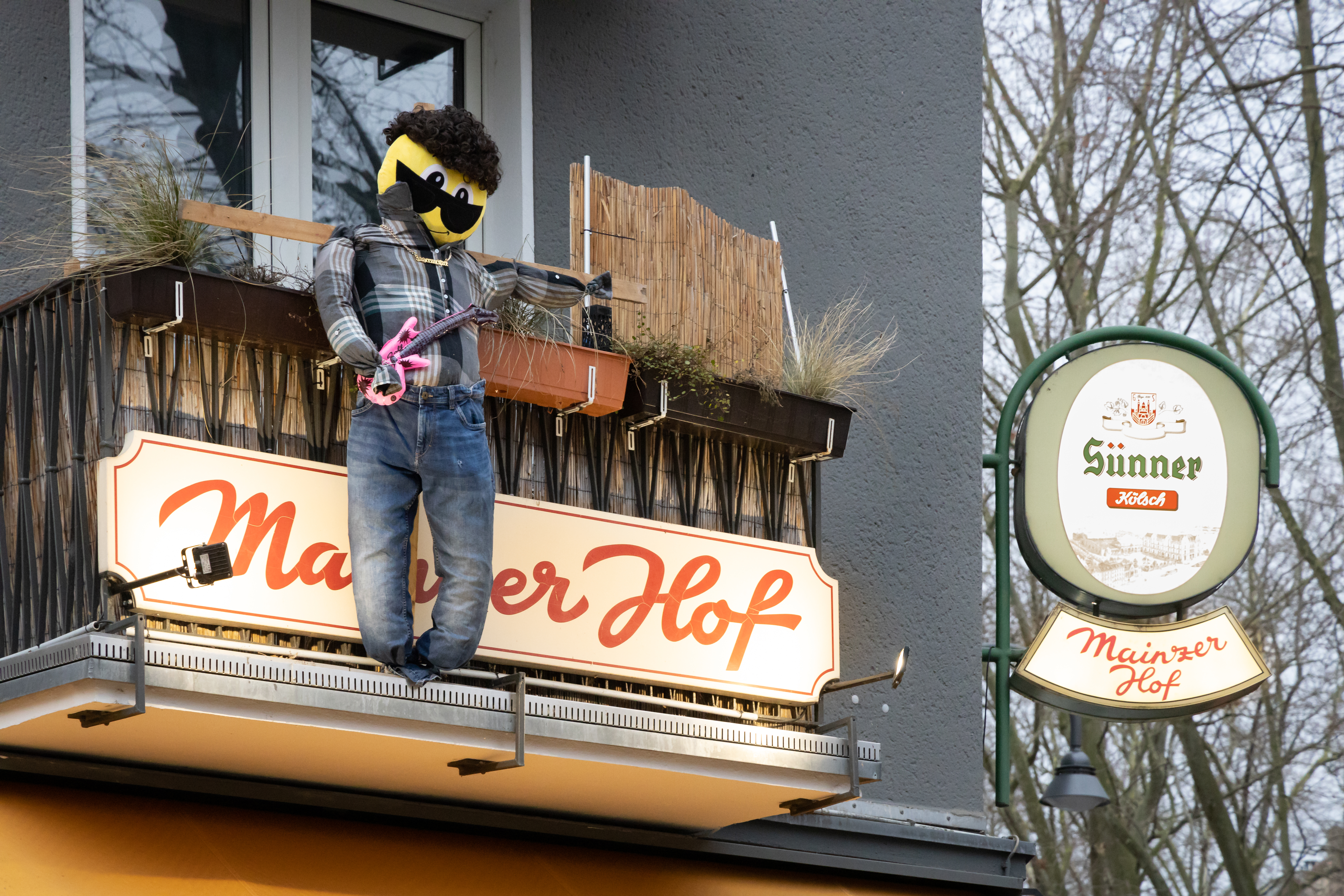
A nubbel above a pub entrance in Cologne's Südstadt district

Nubbel is a name for a dressed straw doll that emerged around 1950 representing the scapegoat in the Rhenish carnival. The Nubbel, also called Zacheies in Cologne carnival, hangs above many pubs during the carnival season and is burned in a ceremony on the night before Ash Wednesday.

The term Nubbel in Colognian was already used independently of the straw doll in the 18th century. It was used when people could not or did not want to give more information, e.g. "Nubbel's Chris" ("somebody"), "he is with the Nubbel" ("he is somewhere"), "that was the Nubbel" ("that was somebody").

== Burning the Nubbel ==
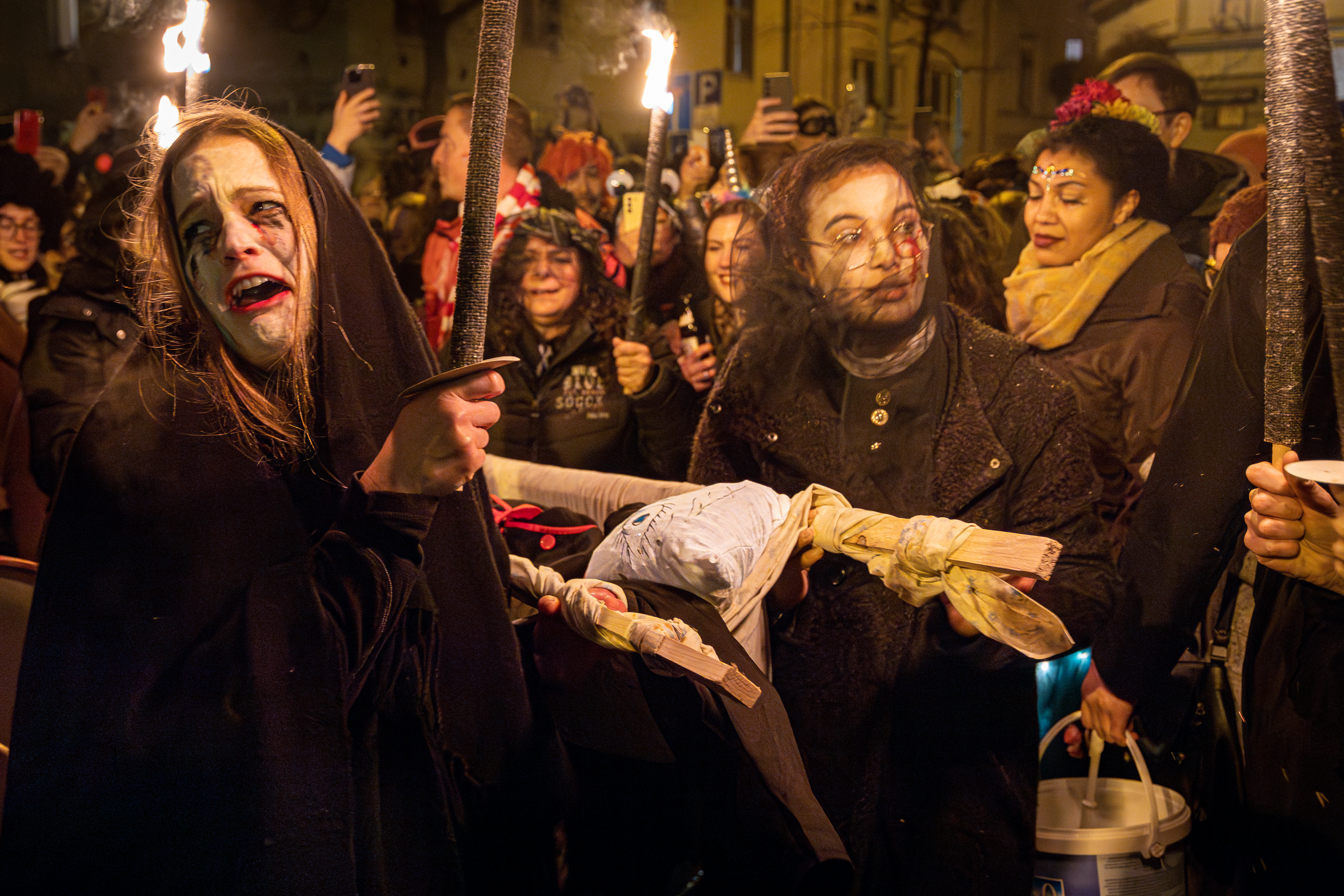
The death of the Nubbel is mourned in a funeral procession.

The burning of a figure at the end of Carnival has been historically verifiable in the Rhineland since the beginning of the 19th century. The Cologne author Ernst Weyden writes in his memoirs of the 1820s, when carnival events in Cologne were reorganized, that on Ash Wednesday "the carnival was carried to its grave": "With a solemn funeral procession, a doll was carried through the city on a bier and burned in a square." Weyden also points to an "old festive custom" that "has survived in southern Germany and even in Greece," and also claims to have seen a "pompous funeral celebration of Shrovetide" as a Shrovetide play in 1812 among the Napoleonic troops then stationed in Cologne.

The exact sequence of this tradition varies from city to city and from pub to pub. Normally, on Weiberfastnacht, the start of the street carnival, the Nubbel is placed on the facade of the pubs near the door. In a short parade around the block, he is solemnly carried to his grave on Shrove Tuesday at midnight by torchlight or candlelight.

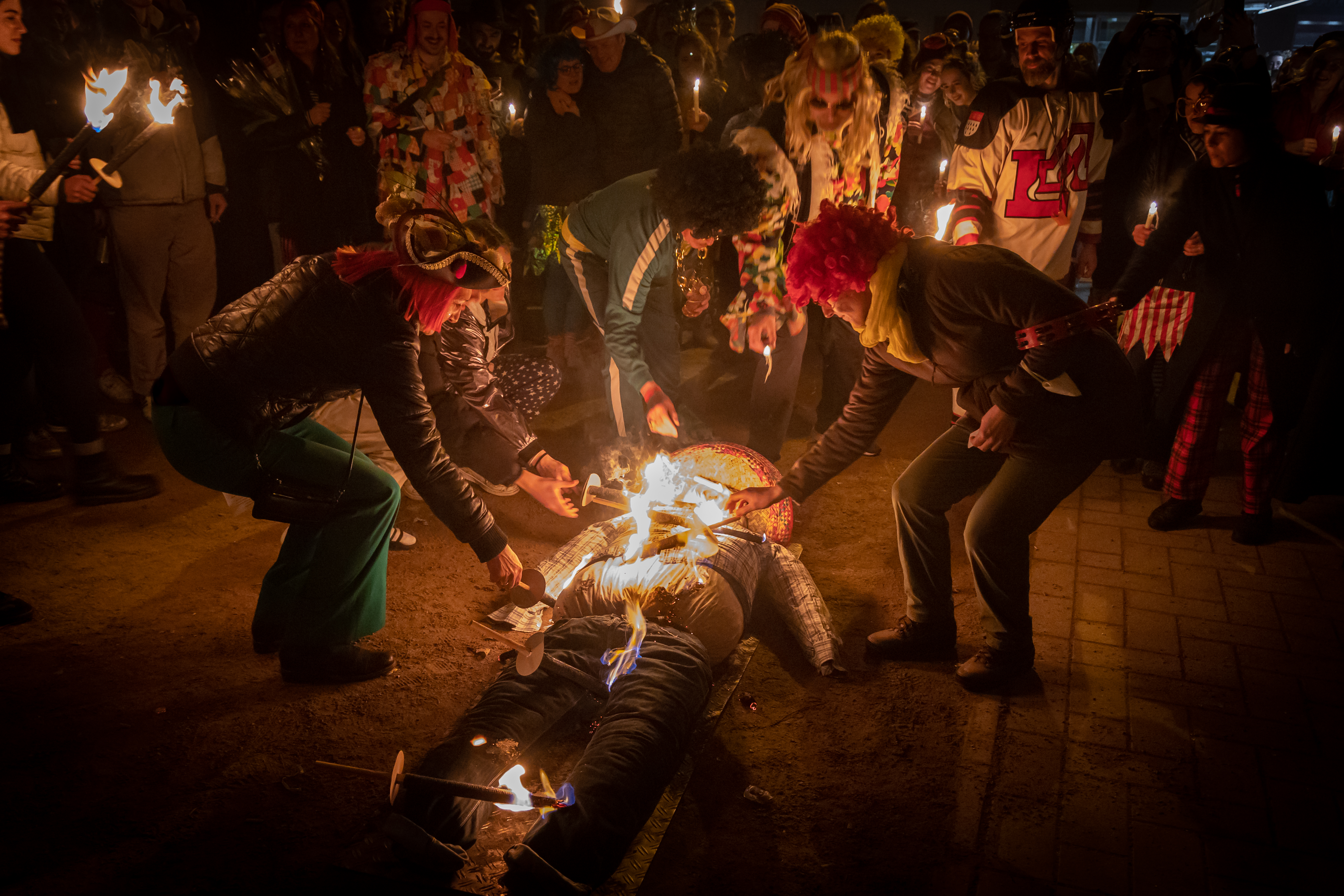
The Nubbel is lit collectively.

Then a charge is recited. This is usually done in dialect and often in rhyme. The accuser is a carnivalist dressed as a cleric. At first, the crowd defends the Nubbel, but eventually they are convinced of his guilt and demand revenge. The accusation then culminates, for example, in rhetorical questions such as: "Who is to blame that we drank away all our money? Who is to blame for cheating on our partners?". The jeering crowd responds to the speaker with a loud "It was the Nubbel!", "The Nubel is to blame, let him burn!" or similar.

According to carnival folklore, the burning of the nubbel leads to forgiveness of sins and offenses committed during the carnival period. After the burning the group goes back to the pub and continues the carnival music until Ash Wednesday morning, when the carnival season is finally over.

== See also ==
- King Momo, the character that in some Latin American carnival celebrations is represented by a doll that is burned at the end of the festivities
