= Die 3 Colonias =

- Genres: Colognian Dialect and Karnevalsmusik
- Years active: 1976–present
- Members: Marcus Schmitter (accordion, vocals, keyboard, since 2013); Fred Isenberg (trumpet, vocal, since 2015); Frank Morawa (keyboard, vocals, since 2001)
- Past members: Paul Rumpen (contrabass, 1976–1978); Walter Haarhaus (accordion, 1976–1992); Oliver Hoff (vocals, 1978–1998); Andreas Weber (keyboard, vocals, 1992–2001); Dieter Steudter (vocals, 1976–2013); Willi Wilden (guitar, vocals, 1998–2013); Robert Lennerts (guitar, vocals, 2013–2015)
- Website: 3colonias.de

Die 3 Colonias (Colognian pronunciation: [də dʁeɪ koˈlónejas]; "the three Coloniad") is a music group from Cologne with many activities in the Cologne Carnival. Their predominant language of performances is Colognian.

They were founded in 1976 by the Cologne Dieter Steudter. Trained confectioner Steudter ran his own café on the Kaiser-Wilhelm-Ring until the mid-1980s, when he had to give up for health reasons. Since the beginning of the 1970s, he began to compose and write and even to play in the carnival. He was accompanied by accordionist Walter Haarhaus. To emulate their role models, the Eilemann Trio, a bassist, Paul Rumpen, joined the group, followed two years later by Oliver Hoff.

Their breakthrough had the group with the songs "Ja die Oma will nach Palma" and "Bier und nen Appelkorn". For the ice hockey club Kölner Haie the group composed and produced in 1980 the fan anthem "Wir sind die Haie". In 1993 Dieter Steudter composed the carnival hit "Eimol Prince zo sin" for Wicky Junggeburth, which also produced the 3 colonies and published.

In 1992 Walter Haarhaus left the 3 colonies, for him came Andreas Weber as keyboardist. Oliver Hoff began a solo career as a comedian and Millowitsch impersonator; He was followed by Willi Wilden. 2001 Frank Morawa took over the place of Andreas Weber. 2013, guitarist and singer Robert Lennerts and keyboarder / accordionist and singer Marcus Schmitter performed, appearing since 1990 as "Die Original Bergischen Gaudibuam" and since 2006 as "De Spetzbove", Willi Wilden and Dieter Steudter, working together with keyboarder Frank Morawa Cast of the music group. Robert Lennerts left the group in 2015 for professional reasons. For him came Fred Isenberg as a new singer. Dieter Steudter remained in the group until 2015 as manager. [5]

The most famous recordings of The 3 Colonies were released as singles. They have also been well received outside the region, including a drinking song of beer and an Appelkorn (beer and an apple and corn schnapps) and in Africa is Mother's Day (Today is Mother's Day in Africa), as well as "Halt's Maul, sei still" (be quiet) and "Ob Kölsch, ob Pils, ob Alt" (Kölsch, whether Pils, whether Alt).

== Discography ==
=== LPs ===
- 1992: Die großen Erfolge – Pavement Records, Bergisch Gladbach
- 1996: Hallo Kölle! – Pavement Records
- 2009: Volldampf – Wolfgang Löhr, Köln
- 2010: Weihnachten mit den 3 Colonias – Wolfgang Löhr, Köln
- 2014: Kuh-Tipps, Quatsch & Fastelovend – Dabbelju Music

=== Singles ===
- 1983: Bier und ’nen Appelkorn – Colonia-Musik-Produktion; 1984 EMI-Electrola
- 1983: Nein, nein, nein, das darf doch nich wahr sein (Fussball-Ballade) – Margaretha Jansen, Köln
- 1984: Ja, de Oma will nach Palma – blm music entertainment, Bad Honnef
- 1984: In zehntausend Jahren – blm, Bad Honnef
- 1984: Hurra, hurra (das Sünderlied) – EMI-Electrola
- 1984: Ach du leeven Jott – blm, Bad Honnef
- 1985: In Afrika ist Muttertag – EMI-Electrola
- 1986: Aufe Dauer … (dat Maloche-Lied) – EMI-Electrola
- 1988: Oh, wie tut das gut! – EMI-Electrola
- 1988: Es war in Königswinter – EMI-Electrola
- 1991: Mir sin zwar kein 18 [achtzehn] mieh – Pavement Records
- 1994: Sulang d'r Dom noch steiht – Pavement Records
- 1995: Wie dä Kääl dat bloss määt?! – Pavement Records
- 2002: Der Schützenkönig – Papagayo Musikverlage Hans Gerig oHG
- 2005: Vera (zeig mir dein Dessous) – Pavement Records
- 2006. Die Fröschelche – Dabbelju
- 2008: Halt´s Maul, sei still (ich geh Heim, wann ich will) – Dabbelju
- 2009: Die alte Dampfeisenbahn – Dabbelju
- 2009: Eimol Prinz zo sin in Kölle am Rhing – Dabbelju
- 2011: Ich han en Mötz, ich bin jetz Präsident – Dabbelju/Pavement Records
- 2012: Muh, Muh, ich bin ne Kuh – Alaaf! Records/recordJet/Dabbelju/Xtreme Sound
- 2013: Wir sind die Haie (Neuaufnahme) – Alaaf! Records/recordJet
- 2014: So schön ist´s nur einmal (Der Song zum "Aufstieg 2014" des 1. FC Köln) – Alaaf! Records/recordJet
- 2014: Und die Hände gehen so – a la tete records
- 2014: Ich dräume met offene Auge vun Dir – Dabbelju
- 2015: Sulang d'r Dom noch steiht (Neuaufnahme) – Alaaf! Records/recordJet/Dabbelju
- 2016: Ob Kölsch, ob Pils, ob Alt – Alaaf! Records/recordJet/Moewe-Musik/Hitmix Musikagentur
- 2017: Ach wenn doch nur jeden Tag Karneval wär – Alaaf! Records/recordJet/Moewe-Musik/Hitmix Musikagentur
- 2018: Lustig sein (1x Lululu) – Alaaf! Records/Moewe-Musik/Hitmix Musikagentur/Dabbelju Music

== Awards ==
- 1993: Honorary membership in the club Cologne Carnival for Walter Haarhaus
- 2010: Das Herz von Kölle (The Heart Of Cologne)
- 2012: Honorary membership in the club Cologne Carnival for Dieter Steudter
- 2012: Order of Merit in gold of the festival committee Kölner Karneval for Dieter Steudter
