= Dietrich Gresemund =

German humanist writer (1477–1512)

Dietrich Gresemund (1477 – 14 October 1512) was a German humanist writer.

== Biography ==
Gresemund was born at Speyer. His father, also named Dietrich, was a native of Meschede in Westphalia.

Gresemund was educated first at Erfurt, where he became magister, and subsequently in Italy. Having graduated in medicine at Speyer, he became court-physician and councillor to the Elector of Mainz Bertold von Henneberg-Römhild, in which city young Dietrich grew up and attracted attention at an early age because of his learning and ability. As early as 1493 he became associated with Jakob Wimpfeling, Adam Werner von Themar, and Abbot Trithemius, and in 1494 he published his first work. Even at that date Trithemius admitted him to his Catalogus illustrium virorum with warm eulogies, on the ground that the youth had surpassed many men of mature age, including even doctors.

Having received a thorough classical education from his father and attended lectures in dialectics at the University of Mainz, Dietrich studied law at Padua in 1495, and at Bologna in 1497. In 1498 he received the degree of doctor legum at Ferrara, and in 1499 he matriculated at Heidelberg. About 1501 he was in Rome to study antiquities, but soon had enough of the city, and wrote two very caustic epigrams regarding Alexander VI. On his return to Mainz a succession of honours awaited him during the brief remnant of life that was allotted to him. In 1505 he became canon at St. Stephen's Church, Mainz, in 1506 vicar-general, in 1508 prothonotary and judex generalis, in 1509 diffinitor cleri minoris at St. Stephen's, and in 1510 scholasticus in the same chapter.

His first work was called Lucubratiunculæ (1494) and dedicated to Trithemius. The book is divided into three parts. The first of these, a dialogue in which is discussed the value of the seven liberal arts, met with applause and was reprinted several times. It is worth remarking that this book contains the first plea from the Rhenish country for a reform in the teaching of grammar. His dialogue on the Mainz carnival deals with a humorous subject (1495) at Mainz, he delivered a discourse at a synod presided in the light of a stern censor of the moral life of the clergy. His longest poem tells in moralizing fashion the story of the mutilation of a crucifix by an actor (Historia violate crucis, written about 1505, but not printed until 1512).

Gresemund's hobby was the collection of ancient coins and inscriptions. In 1510 he issued an edition of short texts in Roman archaeology. Death prevented the publication of his works on antiquities, and the manuscripts had been lost. Individual poems were written for the publications of his friends. He died young of hernia, at Mainz.

Erasmus paid him a splendid tribute in his edition of St. Jerome in 1516, and Hieronymus Gebwiler describes him in the following words: "Dietrich was slender of body and of medium height, with well-moulded features, dark hair, grey eyes, even-tempered, without rancour, without presumption, without pride, without affectation, gentle in his manner, and truthful".
