= Mainz carnival =

Festival preceding Lent in Mainz, Germany

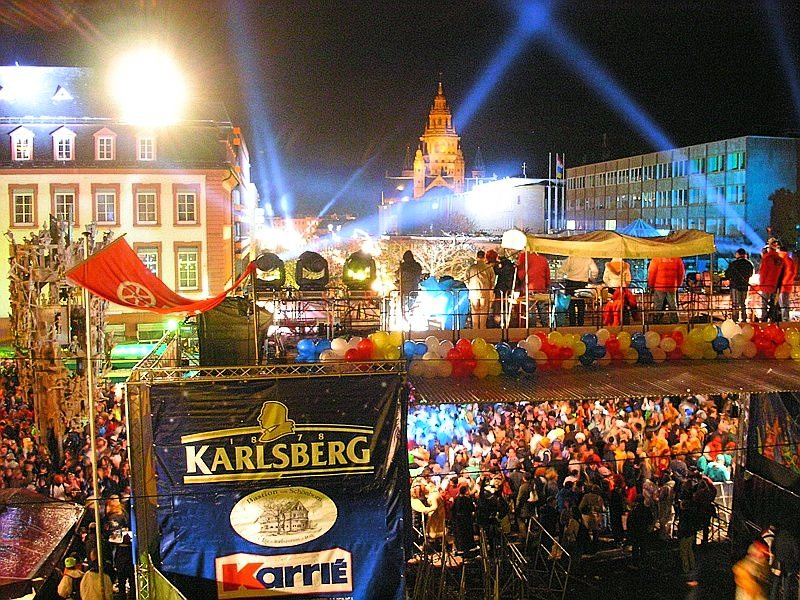
Rosenmondnacht 2004, view from the Schillerplatz with carnival fountain, down the Ludwigsstraße to Mainz Cathedral

The Mainz Carnival (Mainzer Fastnacht, "Määnzer Fassenacht" or "Meenzer Fassenacht") is a months-long citywide carnival celebration in Mainz, Germany that traditionally begins on 11 November but culminates in the days before Ash Wednesday in the spring.

It is one of the largest carnival events in Germany and, along with the Cologne and Düsseldorfer carnivals, Mainz is one of the three cities prominent in the rhenish carnival tradition. Aside from the celebrations, parades, and jollity which are typical of carnival traditions in many countries, the Mainz carnival has an unusual emphasis on political and literary humor and commentary.

== History ==
=== Early beginnings ===
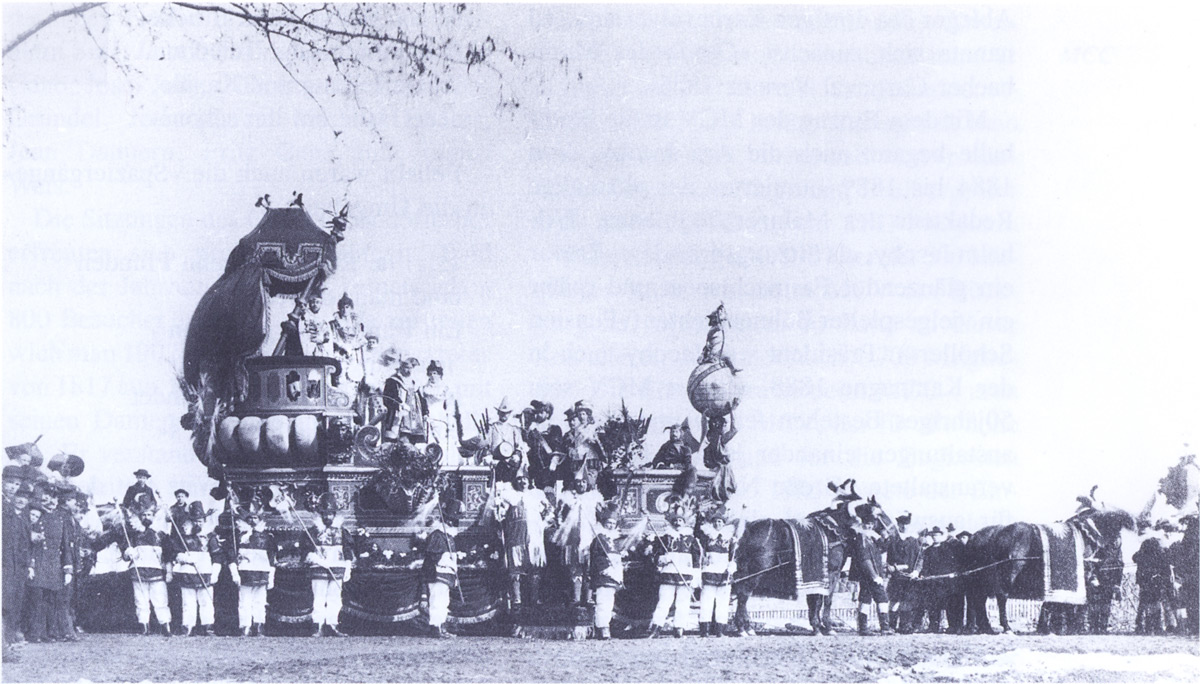
The carnival princes cart of the 1886 Rosenmontag parade

The tradition of carnival can be traced back to the Christian moveable feasts, where Ash Wednesday is the first day of Lent and occurs forty-six days (forty days not counting Sundays) before Easter. The first written records of the tradition date from the 13th and 14th century. By that time, regulations against excessive gluttony and debauchery during the days before carnival had been established. The word "Fastnacht" or carnival occurs for the first time during the 13th century. Details about the old Mainz carnival are not thoroughly covered in primary sources. A scripture of the Mainz humanist writer Dietrich Gresemund dated to the end of the 15th century describes carnival as an unorganized Volksfest comprising masquerade, meals, drinking and dancing during day and night. He describes the celebrants engaging in crude jokes or, under the protection of their masks, excessive quarrelling.

Simultaneously, huge carnival celebrations at the electoral court happened, where the roles at the court were rearranged at random. In 1664 the prince elector drew the role of the electoral cabinetmaker, in 1668 he was cup-bearer and had to serve all guests. This habit was called "Mainzer Königreich" (Mainz kingdom). This roleplaying tradition continued until the last elector, Friedrich Karl Joseph von Erthal, terminated it in 1775.

During carnival time, the general public was allowed to attend the masked balls...

With the end of the Ancien Régime, the "people's carnival" continued, but, according to old records, degenerated into vulgarity. The upper-class at that time celebrated costume parties, carrying on a tradition which had existed previously.

The origins of the contemporary carnival in Mainz lie in the strengthening of the middle class after the end of the Ancien Régime at the beginning of the 19th century and stronger economic relations with Cologne. In the latter city, reforms were made in the carnival in 1823, which introduced carnevalistic events in great halls, as well as a big parade on Rosenmontag. In addition, the middle-class in Mainz strived for alternate forms of social gatherings and readily accepted the Cologne Reform, with the slight variation of placing a greater emphasis on opposition and competition. After the old carnival was restored in Cologne, the Mainz carnivalists organized a parade named "Krähwinkler Landsturm" in 1837, where the oldest carnival organization in Mainz, later called the Mainzer Ranzengarde, appeared the first time. Like other carnival organizations in the Rhineland at the time, fees for joining were high enough that participation was largely restricted to the upper middle class. It was not until the mid-19th century that a proliferation of clubs and resulting drop in membership fees allowed lower middle class participation. The clubs would meet weekly beginning in January to plan events for final week of carnival. Unlike other rhenish carnival cities, in Mainz, the clubs tended to be slightly more heterogeneous, as members of the clubs were allowed to bring friends, and often did, from outside the burgeoning middle class.

The initiative for creating the first organization may be traced back to the merchant Nicolaus Krieger. His primary objective was that the rather disgustingly vulgar people's carnival was transformed by organized activities to an orderly event, generating revenue for the innkeepers and attracting tourists.

January 19, 1838 is the date of foundation of the Mainzer Carneval-Verein (Mainz carnival association). This first carnival association of the town took over responsibilities as an umbrella organization and is still organizing the Mainzer Rosenmontagszug today. The association's first act was to plan a ‘carnival Monday parade’, which took place on February 26, 1838. The main features of the Mainzer Fastnacht have not changed substantially since 1838.

=== Rise of carnival to a social event ===
In the beginning, the Mainz carnival was non-political. The activities of the carnivalistic organizations (MCV, Ranzengarde, Rosenmontagszug, sessions) had been watched closely by the grand ducal authorities, but generally allowed to continue. This is indicated by the fact that some carnival associations had been allowed to be founded again and again, but only for one particular season. Each 11 November they were refounded, and this was approved by the authorities. Within the 19th century this process became a tradition. It was eventually given up due to the associated inconveniences.

The politicization of the Mainz carnival started when celebrants used the opportunity of the carnival to mock French troops stationed in the city in the early 19th century, and accelerated in the run-up to the revolutions of 1848 in the German states, when revolutionary leader Franz Heinrich Zitz became president of the Mainz carnival association (MCV) in 1843 and the democrat Philipp Wittmann joined the committee. The symbolism of the Jacobin Club turning to the foolish may be traced back to these two men: the interpretation of the foolish cap as extended Phrygian cap, the colours blue, white, red, and yellow derived from the Tricolour, the committee as a "revolutionary council of the eleven". During the revolutionary year 1848 itself, the carnival was cancelled, and the carnival gazette "Narhalla" turned to a revolutionary flyer.

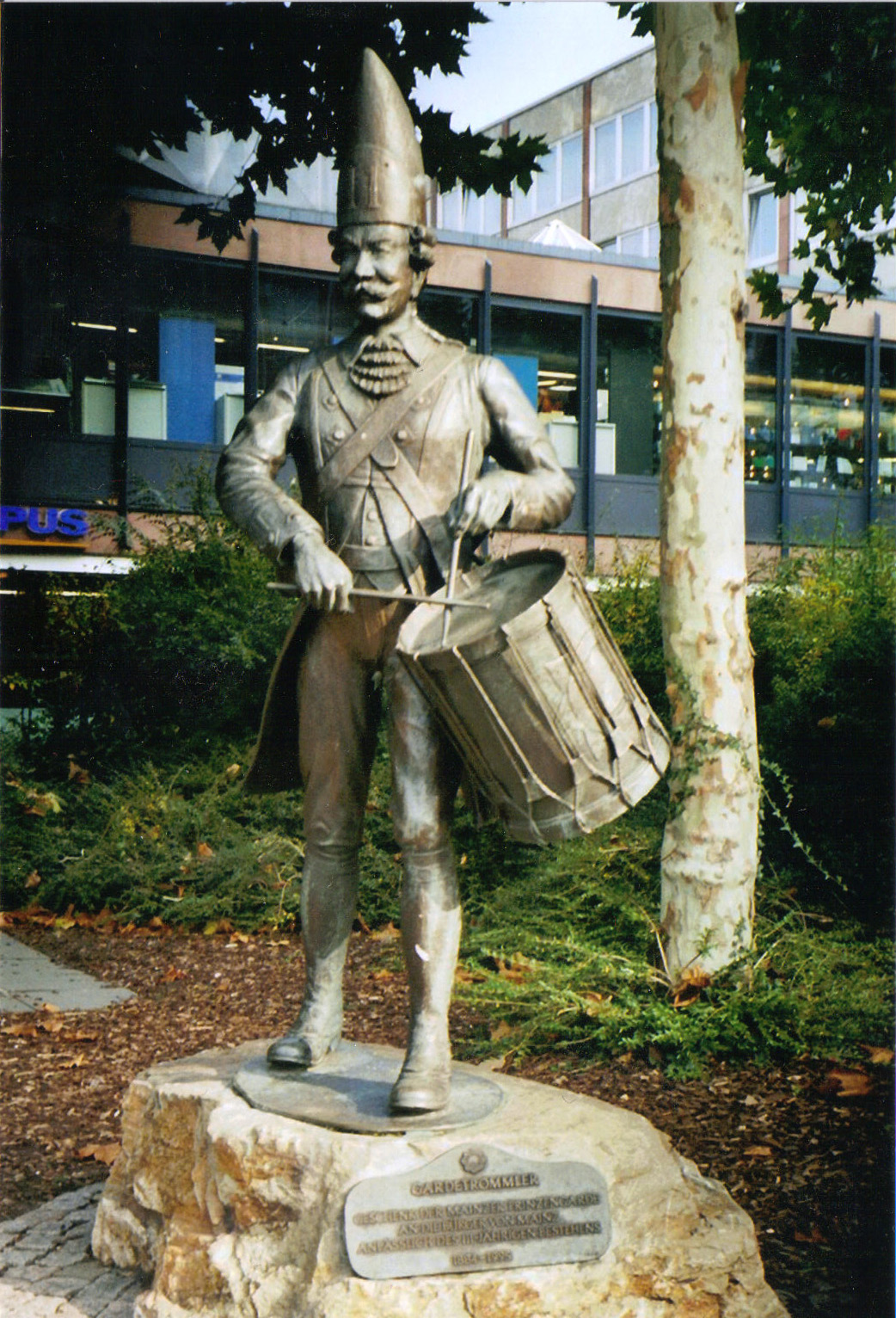
Drummer of the Mainzer Prinzengarde

Starting in the 1840s, political commentary and critique had become much more common in carnival events, especially in the weekly club meetings that ostensibly existed to organize celebrations. Speakers would often have to be coy about their meaning, but nonetheless the carnival had become an outlet for political dissent. The ability to speak publicly about politics, however veiled the reference, made the events popular, and the 1840s saw the founding of a second carnival club. This one, founded by a chimney sweep and a paper hanger, had an inexpensive membership fee to allow working class citizens to participate.

During the years after the revolution, carnival activities declined briefly. By 1855, however, the tradition began to see a resurgence, leading to a rapid increase in the number of club members and to the foundation of new corporations (Kleppergarde, 1856). In 1857, events were cancelled due to the explosion of the powder magazine and in 1866 due to the Austro-Prussian War. The Rosenmontagszüge had also to be cancelled in following years due to single events. In 1884 the MCV took the opportunity to give a session in the newly finished guildhall, which they would continue to use for the next 50 years. In later years many new associations arose: the Mombacher Carneval Verein (1886), the Gonsenheimer Carneval Verein (1892) and the Carnival association "Eiskalte Brüder" (1893). As Guards, the Mainzer Prinzengarde (1884), the Prinzessgarde (1886), renamed in 1933 as Guard of the Princess, the Mombacher Prinzengarde (1886) and the Jocus-Garde (1889) were added.

== Theme and characters ==
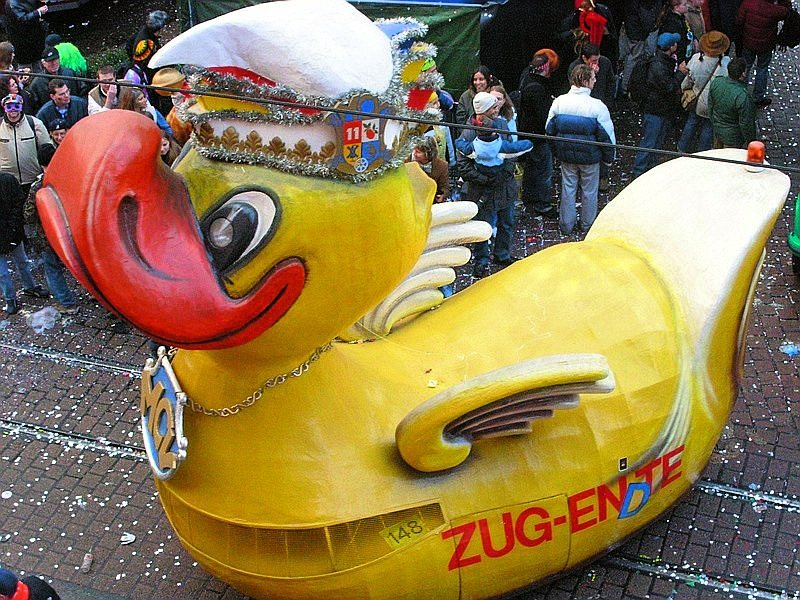
A carnival float intended to come at the end of the parade that plays on the German words for closing (Ende) and duck (Ente)

Traditionally, carnival season in Mainz begins on November 11 at 11:11, and continues through Ash Wednesday. However, the event peaks in February or March in the days leading up to Ash Wednesday.

During the 19th century celebrants began using the carnival as an opportunity to mock the military forces occupying the city's fortress. The uniforms of the carnival guards are still reminders of the uniforms of the Austrian, Prussian, and French troops which were present in the town between 1792 and 1866. Others, like the Landsknecht uniform of the Weisenauer Burggrafengarde trace their lineage as far back as the middle-ages. Uniform parts of the electoral troops are also present. The guards, who spoof military habits and oaths, have a big role in the street carnival, making up large portions of the parades. The Mainzer Rosenmontagszug is highly renowned among the parades. It had been recorded since 1910 on film, and is often broadcast live nationwide. It is less formal than many parades, as celebrants can and often do join in to walk the parade route for a brief time. Marchers are often very informal about their roles, sometimes drinking beer as they ride parade floats.

Political commentary and caricature have become a notable part of the Mainz carnival, and especially of its parades. For example, floats during one parade in the late 1980s showed Uncle Sam and a Russian soldier climbing out of suits of armor, and portrayed Soviet General Secretary Mikhail Gorbachev in a bathtub.

The battle cry of the Mainz carnival, Helau, originates from Düsseldorf and was introduced in 1938 in Mainz.

== Sources ==
- Werner Hanfgarn, Bernd Mühl, Friedrich Schütz: Fünfundachtzig Mainzer Jahre. Die Stadt, die Fastnacht, Jakob Wucher in Geschichte und Geschichten Verlag Dr. Hanns Krach, Mainz 1983, ISBN 3-87439-097-7
- Michael Matheus (ed.): Fastnacht/Karneval im europäischen Vergleich (Mainzer Vorträge 3). Franz Steiner Verlag, Mainz 1999, ISBN 978-3-515-07261-8.
- Herbert Schwedt (ed.): Analyse eines Stadtfestes. Die Mainzer Fastnacht. Wiesbaden 1977 (Mainzer Studien zur Sprach- und Volksforschung 1) ISBN 3-515-02664-9
- Günter Schenk: Mainz Helau. Handbuch zur Mainzer Fastnacht. Leinpfad Verlag, Ingelheim 2004, ISBN 3-937782-07-9
- Günter Schenk: Mainz, wie es singt und lacht. Fastnacht im Fernsehen - Karneval für Millionen. Ingelheim 2004, ISBN 3-937782-19-2
- Friedrich Schütz: Die moderne Mainzer Fastnacht in Franz Dumont (ed.), Ferdinand Scherf, Friedrich Schütz: Mainz – Die Geschichte der Stadt. Verlag Phillip von Zabern, Mainz 1999, ISBN 3-8053-2000-0
- Carl Zuckmayer: Die Fastnachtsbeichte. Carnival confession.
- Ralph Keim: Fastnacht in Meenz. Sutton-Verlag, Erfurt, ISBN 978-3-86680-160-8

== See also ==
- Narrhallamarsch
