= Neustadt (Mainz) =

- Borough of Mainz
- Coat of arms

- Location of Neustadt within Mainz
- Interactive map of Neustadt
- Location within Germany Location within Rhineland-Palatinate
- Coordinates: 50°0′N 8°15′E
- Country: Germany
- State: Rhineland-Palatinate
- District: Urban district
- City: Mainz

Government
  - Mayor (2019–29): Christoph Hand (Greens)

Area
  - Total: 6.32 km^{2} (2.44 sq mi)
- Elevation: 85–115 m (279–377 ft)

Population (2024)
  - Total: 30,681
  - Density: 4,850/km^{2} (12,600/sq mi)
- Time zone: UTC+01:00 (CET)
  - Summer (DST): UTC+02:00 (CEST)
- Postal codes: 55118
- Dialling codes: 06131
- Website: Neustadt.de

Neustadt, with 30,681 inhabitants (Dec. 2024), is a borough in the north of Mainz, Germany. It is located northwest of the old town, beyond the wide Kaiserstrasse. Characteristic are the great number of squares and traffic-calmed streets, the pubs and cafés, the small shops, the Turkish shops, and smaller craft businesses. Neustadt lives from its mixture of old-established Mainzers, newcomers, immigrants, and young students. It is the most densely populated district in Mainz.

== History ==
In 2022, Neustadt celebrated its 150-year jubilee. The idea of expanding the city of Mainz into the so-called Gartenfeld (literally "garden field"), which was interspersed with improvised buildings, had been around for a long time. On 4 April 1866, the city council chose a draft by Eduard Kreyßig out of several competing plans. The realisation had to wait until after the Franco-Prussian War of 1870/71.

The area called Gartenfeld lay outside the fortress walls of Mainz. There, in the rayon zone, no stone buildings were allowed to stand that could offer protection to advancing troops. The walls severely constricted the Fortress of Mainz. At this time, Mainz already had the highest population density in the Grand Duchy of Hesse. A statistic from 1869 by Alfred Börckel, court counsellor and librarian of the Mainz municipal library, illustrates the predicament; the number of people occupying the space of one Prussian acre was 8 in Barmen, 11 in Potsdam, 24 in Darmstadt, 28 in Berlin, 65 in Hamburg, and 71 in Cologne, but in Mainz, the figure was 89. In other cities, the population grew ever faster in the second half of the 19th century. In Mainz, the flats were hopelessly overcrowded, sanitary facilities were lacking, and a cholera epidemic threatened to break out at any time. Mainz lagged behind in economic development at a time when factories were springing up everywhere else. The reason for this was also the disproportion between the civilian city area, which was about 1.2 km^{2}, and the area used for military purposes or closed off, which was about 7 km^{2}.

The military agreed to the demolition of the old walls only after long, tough negotiations between the city of Mainz and the Prussian War Ministry, after the fortress of Metz in Lorraine formed the new bulwark to France. With the release for development, the previously existing city area doubled in one fell swoop. On 21 September 1872, the city expansion contract was finally signed. This day can be called the founding day of the New Town of Mainz. At the beginning of February 1873, imperial approval was granted. In mid-March 1873, the city began to demolish the ramparts in the area of today's Kaiserstraße and to build on the garden field. However, it also had to build new ramparts further northwest, on the Rheingau Wall, at a cost of four million guilders. Between 1500 and 2000 florins per Hessian acre were paid for the garden plots.

The fortress of Mainz became the property of the German Empire in accordance with the Imperial Act of 25 May 1873 and became an imperial fortress. The New Town on a plan from 1898

Master builder Eduard Kreyßig (1830-1897) shaped the architectural and urban-planning face of the New Town. His basic idea was the development of the garden field through a symmetrical, grid-like street system of longitudinal and transverse axes, broken up by green avenues and squares. His plans were inspired by the 19th-century redesign of Paris by Georges-Eugène Haussmann. Shortly before taking up his post, Kreyßig had visited the Exposition Universelle (1867) in Paris and admired Haussmann's revolutionary ideas.

Three major northwest–southeast axes (Rheinallee, Bonifaziusstraße [today's Hindenburgstraße], and Boppstraße) were to connect the New Town with the Old Town. Construction was first carried out along these main axes. Instead of the ramparts of the garden front, Schönborn's bastion belt, a magnificent boulevard was created, which was then also called "Boulevard" - today's Kaiserstraße. The buildings from this era are still recognisable today, although they were badly affected by the bombing of Mainz in World War II. They are typical Gründerzeit residential buildings, some with splendid facades, as well as some functional buildings such as the Christuskirche, which is visible from afar, the old army bread bakery (Neues Proviantamt) and the main railway station. In 1912, a magnificent central synagogue was built in Hindenburgstraße. This spacious Art Nouveau building fell victim to the National Socialists only 26 years later in the Kristallnacht. It was set on fire and later blown up.

Even today, the main problems with the development of the garden field is obvious, the terrain was very low and therefore frequently flooded. The city builder's plans called for the entire area to be filled in, which was also necessary for the construction of the sewage system. However, due to the size of this huge area, the filling up could only be done step by step. First, the roads were raised. The individual plan squares were then gradually filled in around the houses that had already been built. As a result, many houses in the New Town have particularly deep basements.

The backfilling work was not completed everywhere. Thus, at some points in the Neustadt today, one can find places that still show the low level, e.g. the low level of the Wallaustraße.

A curiosity is the house at No. 77 Wallaustrasse, which has a gateway on the first floor and is entered via the part planned as a cellar. At the time of construction, it was expected that the site would be filled in, which has not yet happened. The Rhine bank, which was also newly filled in, was fortified for military purposes.

The garden field tax, a kind of luxury tax because of the generous amount of space, was levied on the new property owners. Until the Second World War, large areas were still vacant in the area of Goetheplatz and in the northern Neustadt. There were still numerous gardens, for example on Raupelsweg and along Scheffelstraße. Housewives could bleach their laundry on meadows, children and young people could play.

A new rampart, the Rheingau Wall, was built around the new town. It was built in the neo-Prussian fortification style and consisted, among other things, of the cavaliers Prinz Holstein and Hauptstein, Judensand, Fort Hartenberg, the Gonsenheim Gate and the Mombach Gate. In the new town itself, there were again many barracks - such as the Alicekaserne (infantry barracks 1903) a cavalry barracks in Wallstraße (Neue Golden' Rosskaserne) - a garrison hospital in Rheinstraße and magazine rooms of the military administration.

The new, more open city demanded that the railway line be moved away from the banks of the Rhine. Kreyßig moved it to the west side of the city from 1880 with the consequence of tunneling under the citadel and building a new central station. The construction of this station in 1884 was also the initiative of the city's master builder and made possible the connection to another railway line, the Hessian Ludwig Railway, which in 1871 was routed along Gastell's company grounds in the direction of Gonsenheim to Alzey.

After 1918, all fortifications were slighted on behalf of the French military administration.

== Literature ==
- Claus Wolf (2004). Die Mainzer Stadtteile (in German). Emons Verlag. ISBN 3-89705-361-6.
