= Narrhallamarsch =

The Narrhallamarsch is a traditional German carnival tune, a staple of the Mainz carnival (Meenzer Fassenacht) since 1844. It is popularly used by the main football club in the city, Mainz 05.

== Usage ==
The "Narrhallamarsch" is usually played to accompany a speaker's entry and exit from the stage when they give their humorous/satirical speech. The name is a portmanteau of the German word 'Narr' (jester) and Valhalla.

== History ==
In 1838, the people of Mainz founded the Mainzer Carneval-Verein ("Carnival Club of Mainz") and were searching for a lead melody for the local carnival. One of the founding members was the bandmaster Carl Zulehner, (Note: Also: Georg Karl Zulehner (27 September 1805 – 30 May 1847)) who, inspired by the 1840 performance in Mainz of Adolphe Adam's opera Le brasseur de Preston (1838) (German: Der Brauer von Preston), used some of its musical motives to create the "Mainzer Narrhallamarsch". The new tune was presented at the opening of the campaign in 1844 and became the signature tune of the Meenzer Fassenacht.
