= Rosenmontag =

German day during carnival

- Significance: Highlight of Karneval before Lent
- Date: Monday before Ash Wednesday
- 2025 date: 3 March
- 2026 date: 16 February
- 2027 date: 8 February
- 2028 date: 28 February
- Frequency: annual

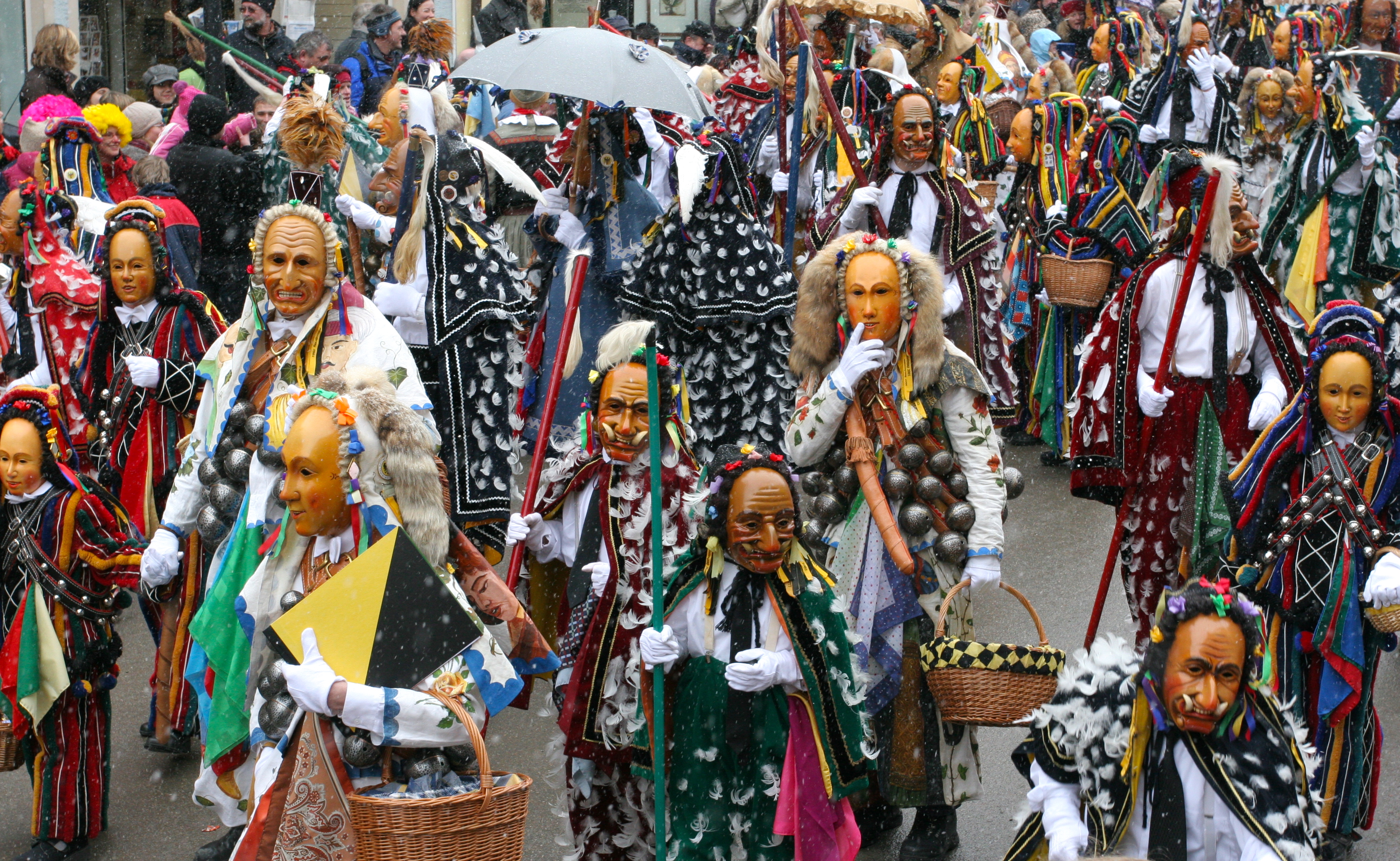
Rose Monday Carnival on Rottweil, Germany

Rosenmontag (German: [ˌʁoːzn̩ˈmoːntaːk]; English: Rose-Monday) is the highlight of the German Karneval (carnival), and takes place on the Shrove Monday before Ash Wednesday, the beginning of Lent. Mardi Gras, though celebrated on Fat Tuesday, is a similar event.

Rosenmontag is celebrated in German-speaking countries, including Germany, Austria, Switzerland, and Belgium (Eupen, Kelmis), but most heavily in the carnival strongholds including the Rhineland, especially in Cologne, Bonn, Düsseldorf, Aachen, and Mainz. In contrast to Germany, in Austria, the highlight of the carnival is not Rosenmontag, but Shrove Tuesday.

The name for the carnival comes from the German dialect word roose, meaning 'to frolic', and Montag, meaning 'Monday'.

== Overview ==
The carnival season begins at 11 minutes past the eleventh hour on 11 November and the "street carnival" starts on the Thursday before Rosenmontag, which is known as Weiberfastnacht ("women's carnival", Fat Thursday). Karneval is prevalent in Roman Catholic areas and is a continuation of the old Roman traditions of slaves and servants being master for a day. Karneval derives from the Latin carnem levare ("taking leave of meat") marking the beginning of Lent.

Carnival is not a national holiday in Germany, but schools are closed on Rosenmontag and the following Tuesday in the strongholds and many other areas. Many schools as well as companies tend to give teachers, pupils and employees the Thursday before Rosenmontag off as well and have celebrations in school or in the working place on Weiberfastnacht, although every now and then there are efforts to cut these free holidays in some companies.

Celebrations usually include dressing up in fancy costumes, dancing, parades, heavy drinking and general public displays with floats. Every town in the Karneval areas boasts at least one parade with floats making fun of the themes of the day. Usually sweets (Kamelle) are thrown into the crowds lining the streets among cries of Helau or Alaaf, whereby the cry Kölle Alaaf is only applied in the Cologne Carnival and Oche Alaaf is only applied in Aachen Carnival– Alaaf stems from or Alle af, Ripuarian for "all [others] away". Sweets and tulips are thrown into the crowd.

The celebrations become quieter the next day, known as Veilchendienstag ("Violet Tuesday", Shrove Tuesday), and end with Ash Wednesday.

== See also ==
- Clean Monday
- Nickanan Night
- Mainz Rose Monday parade
