= Cologne Carnival =

Annual carnival in Cologne, Germany

The Cologne Carnival (German: Kölner Karneval) is a carnival that takes place every year in Cologne, Germany.

Traditionally, the "fifth season" (carnival season) is declared open at 11 minutes past 11 on the 11th of the 11th month, November. The Carnival spirit is then temporarily suspended during the Advent and Christmas period, and picks up again in earnest after 6 January, Epiphany, in the New Year. The time of merrymaking in the streets is officially declared open at downtown square "Alter Markt" on the Thursday before the beginning of Lent. Street carnival, a week-long street festival, also called "the crazy days", takes place between Fat Thursday (Weiberfastnacht) and Ash Wednesday (Aschermittwoch). The highlight of carnival is Rose Monday (Rosenmontag), two days before Ash Wednesday. All through these days, Cologne folks go out masqueraded. The typical greeting during the festival is Kölle Alaaf!, a Kölsch phrase. Every year, 330 tons of candy, 700,000 chocolate bars, and 220,000 boxes of pralines are thrown down on the spectators.

== Dreigestirn ==
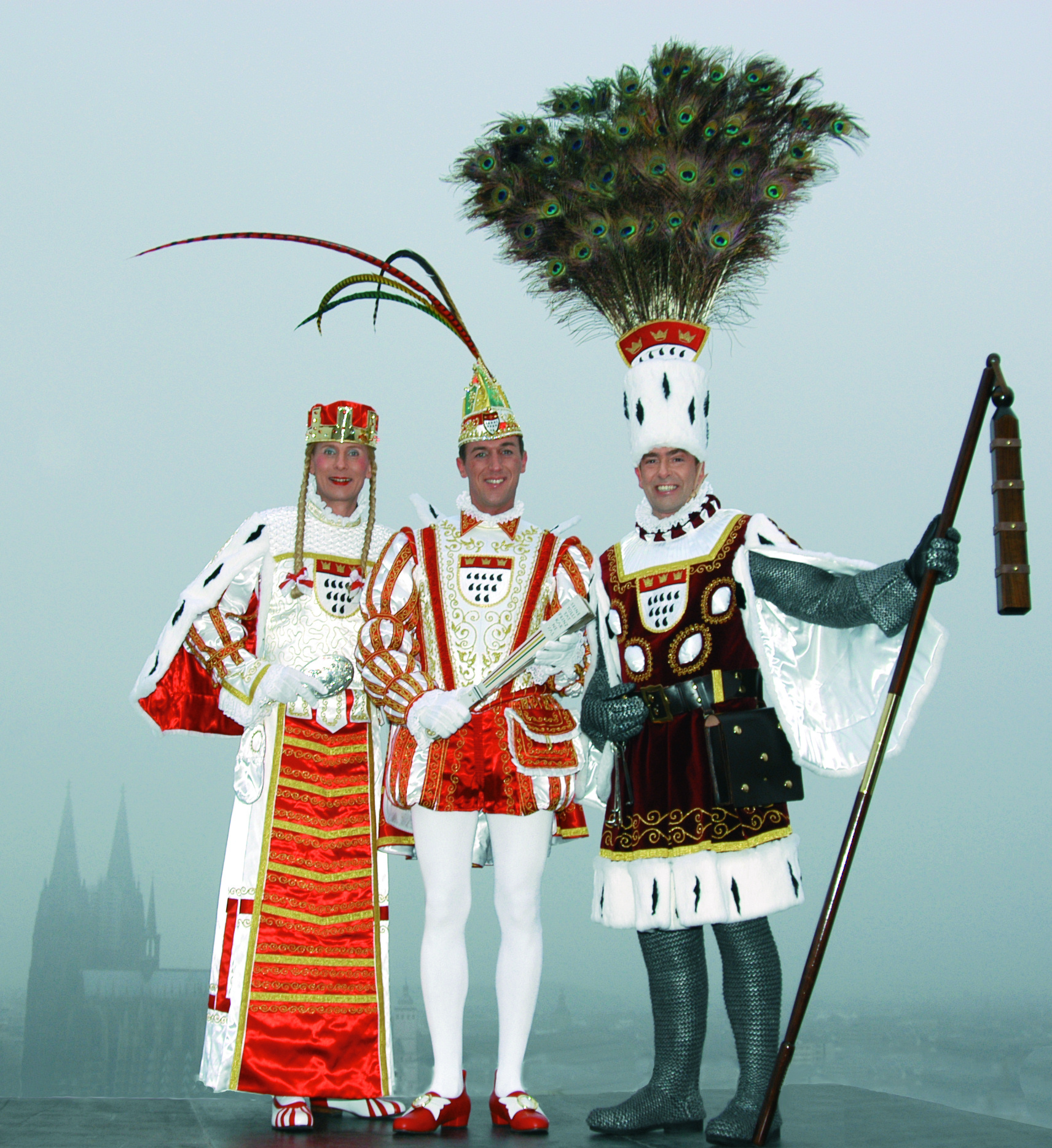
Dreigestirn, 2005 (maiden, prince and peasant)

Every year three people (the Dreigestirn or triumvirate) are granted the titles of Jungfrau, Prinz, and Bauer (maiden, prince and peasant respectively), who pay a large sum of money for the privileges. The carnival prince is deemed to be the highest representative of the festivities, leading the main parades throughout the week. Traditionally, the Jungfrau ("maiden") is always portrayed by a man dressed as a female. As an entity, the trio has existed since 1883. In earlier times these were individual characters, but all three entered the Cologne carnival in the 1820s.

The prince, also called "Seine Tollität" (His Madness), is the most important personage of the Cologne Carnival. His float is the final one in the large parade on Shrove Monday. The naming as "prince" came as late as 1872; prior to it, the name was "Held Carneval" (hero carnival), the personification of carnival. His attributes, however, remained unchanged, those of a regent: a crown with a peacock tail, a golden chain, a girdle with glitzy stones, white undershorts, and a purple jacket. A sceptre in the right hand and a slapstick in the left one. The slapstick is known as a general symbol of the fool, but specifically it is a fertility symbol and the symbol of the princely reign over his foolish people during carnival.

The peasant bears the style "Seine Deftigkeit" (His Heftiness). As Cologne is a large city, the peasant must be a stately guy. He expresses the boldness of the old privileged imperial city of Cologne (which became a full-fledged free imperial city finally in 1475. At that time, Cologne was the largest central European city, having a huge percentage of agricultural land inside its walls and the farmers' guild was well respected and influential). The sword and the flail symbolize his loyalty to the empire and his truthfulness. As the keeper of the city, he also keeps the city keys at his girdle. The key symbolizes the heroes of the city militia contingent in the Battle of Worringen AD1288, whereafter the city achieved independence from the archbishop of Cologne.

The maiden, also called "Ihre Lieblichkeit" (Her Loveliness) symbolizes the patronizing mother Colonia and is traditionally played by a man. A beard or moustache is forbidden for this role. From 1936 to '43, the maiden was ordered by Nazi authorities to be played by a real woman. The Cologne maiden wears a mural crown. This "defender" crown and her virginity symbolize the impregnability of the city. Also, she has a hand mirror symbolizing "female vanity", a recent attribute with no deeper meaning. Her Roman dress is a reminder of the Roman empress Agrippina (the younger, AD 15–59), wife of emperor Claudius. Agrippina was born in the city in AD 15 and succeeded in getting a renaming of the place as the new Roman city of Colonia Claudia Ara Agrippinensium (CCAA) by AD 50.

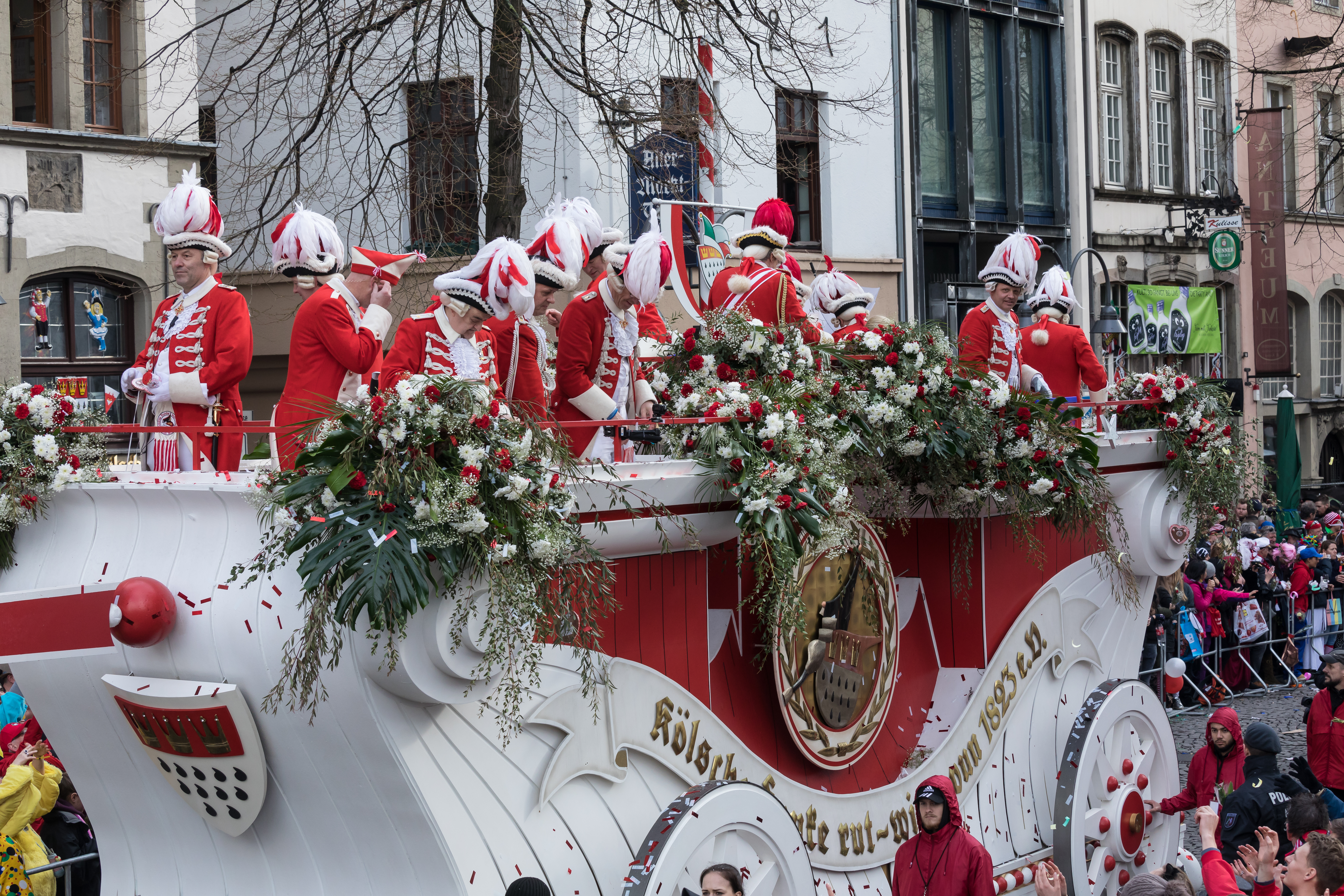
Large carnival wagon

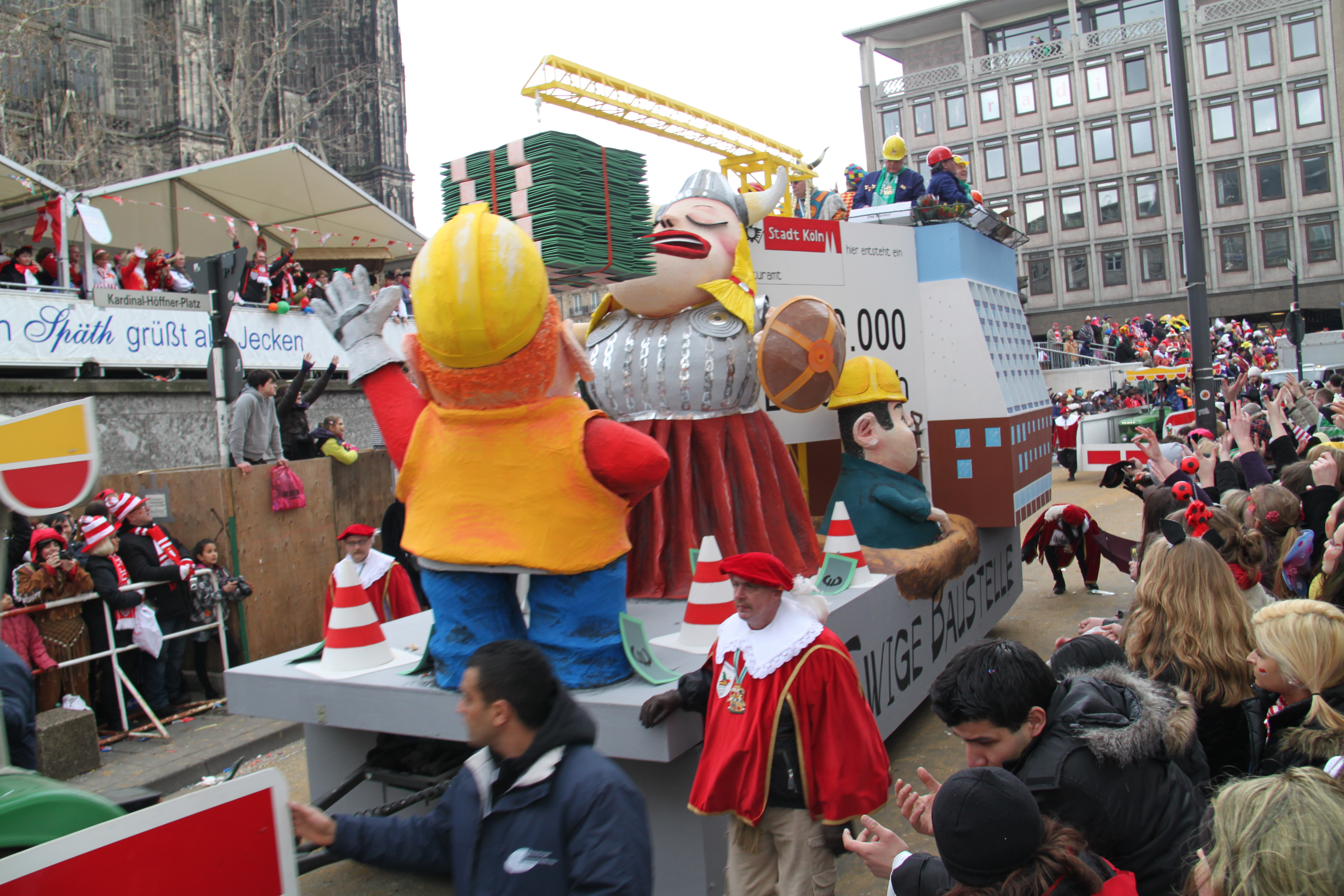
Cartoon wagon

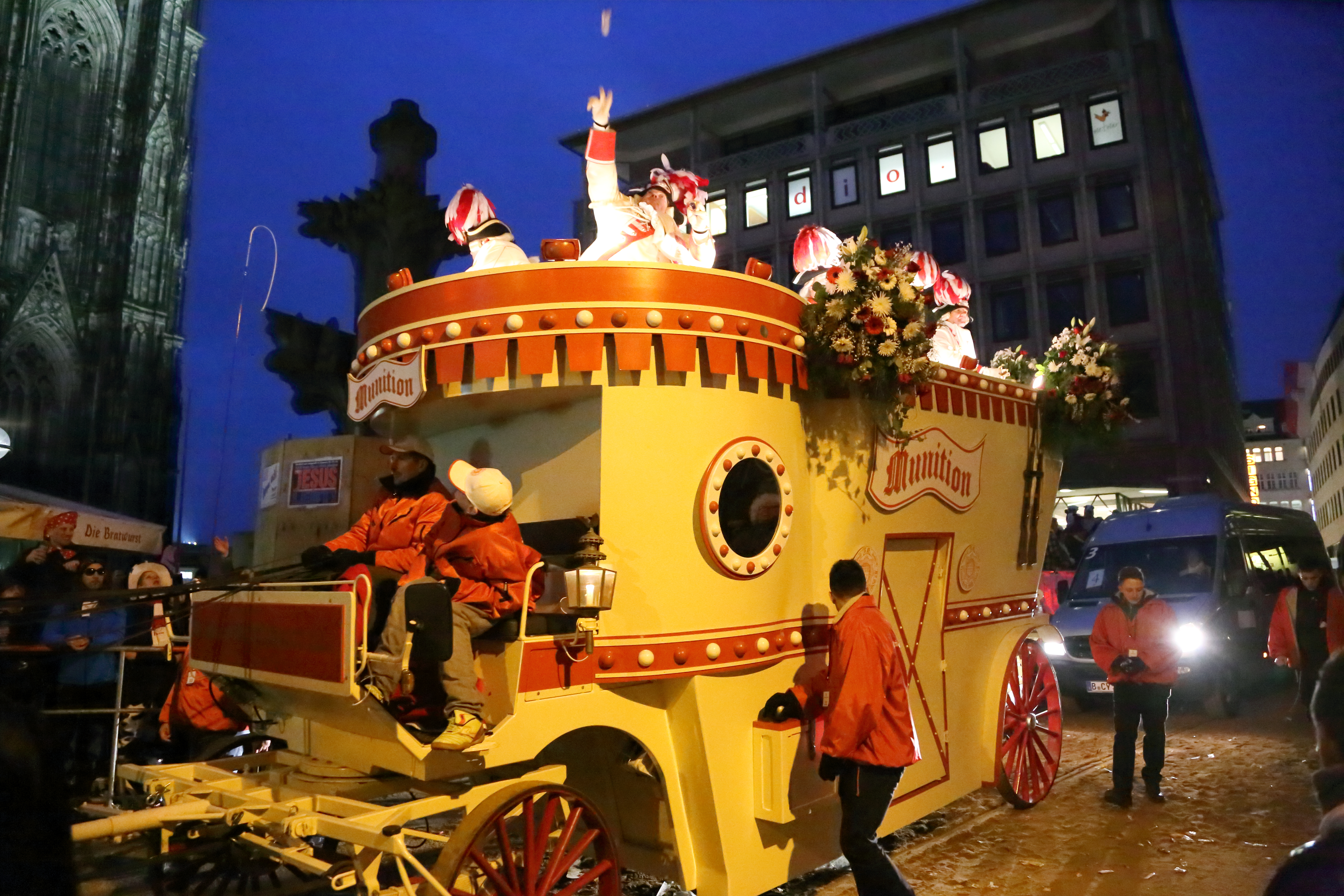
Carnival at Cologne Cathedral

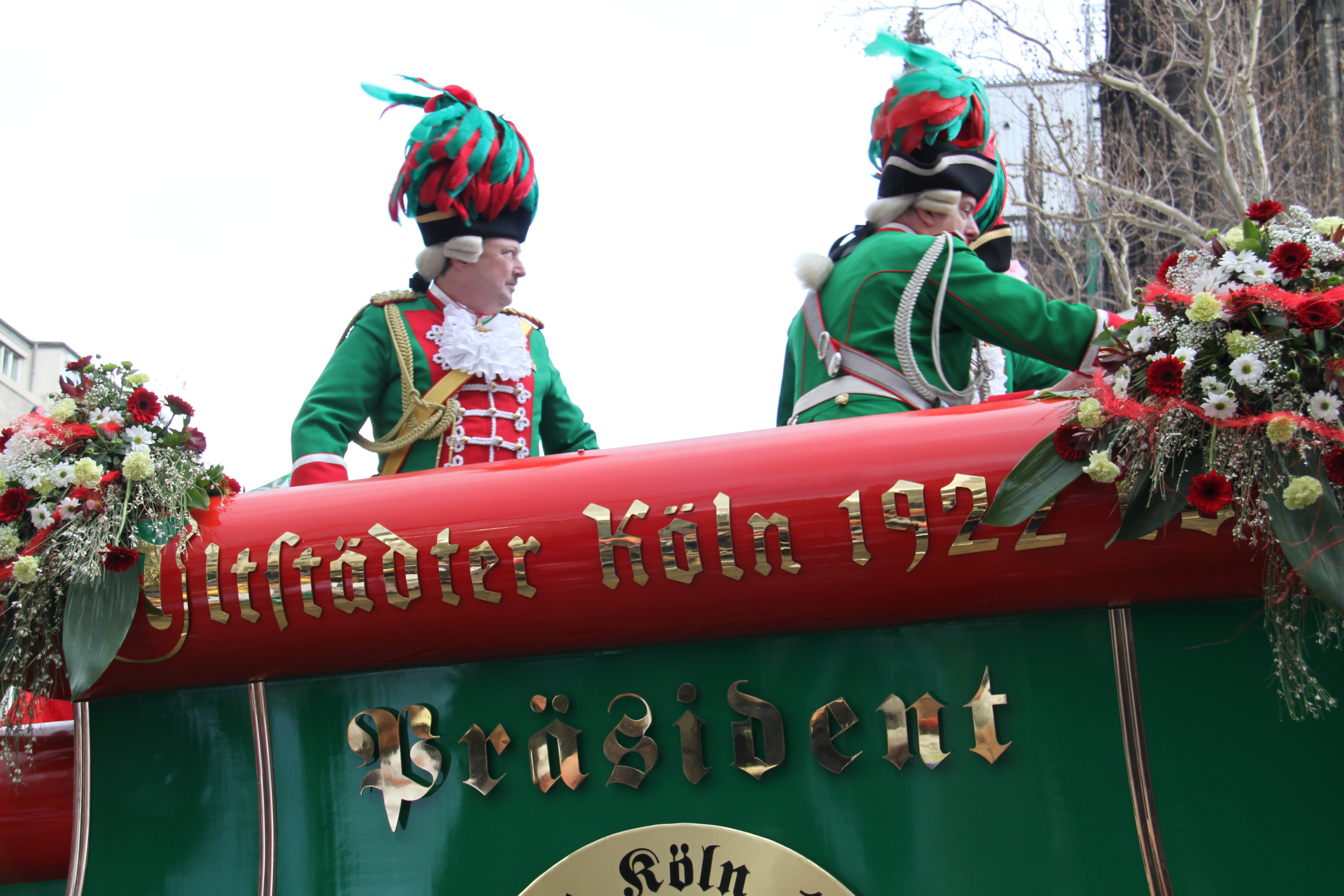
Decorated carnival wagon

== Events ==
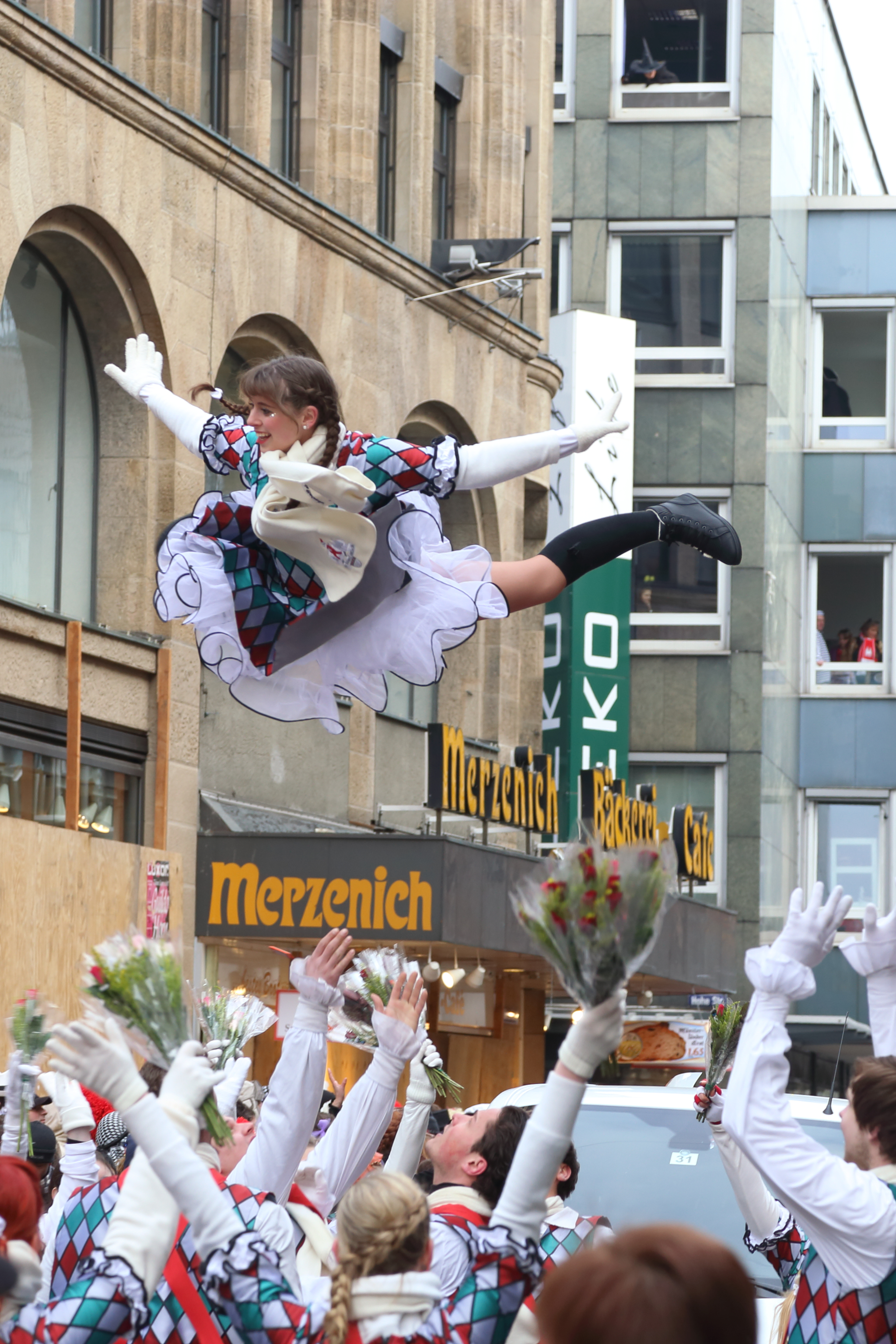
A Funkemariechen (majorette) is lifted at Rose Monday Parade 2013.

The official carnival with its parades, balls, and stage shows (Sitzungen) is run by the Festkomitee Kölner Karneval (Cologne Carnival Celebration Committee), which was founded in 1823. Alongside this, there are many autonomous carnival events throughout the city's bars, clubs, and local communities, including "Stunksitzung", a leftist comedy show caricaturing official carnival Sitzungen in style and poking fun at both traditional, conservative carnival as well as politics. There are numerous parades in the city districts, including a so-called ghost parade in the evening of the Saturday before Fat Thursday . It is a demonstration for social and cultural projects, and, contrary to the other parades, everybody can join and walk through the streets with the spooky crowd. There is also a colourful parade of the Cologne schools and smaller carnival clubs on Carnival Sunday. As there have been continuously more than one million spectators on the streets for the Rose Monday parade every year Cologne carnival is one of the largest street festivals in Europe.

The Cologne Carnival traditionally ends with the burning of the Nubbel on the night of Ash Wednesday. This straw doll hangs above many pubs where carnival is celebrated and is theatrically carried to the grave and burned at the end.

== German carnival singers and bands ==
- Alt-Schuss
- Bernd Stelter
- Bläck Fööss
- Brings
- Cat Ballou
- Colör
- Dä Radschläger
- De Fätzer
- Höhner
- Die 3 Colonias
- De Kläävbotze
- De Klüngelköpp
- Druckluft
- Kasalla
- Kolibris
- Lupo
- Ludwig Sebus
- Marie Luise Nikuta
- Miljö
- Paveier
- Paraplüs
- Querbeat
- Rabaue
- De Räuber
- Die Rheinländer
- Schmackes Royal
- Schmitti
- Bernd Stelter
- De Vajabunde
- Köbes Underground
