= List of cities in Russia by average winter temperature =

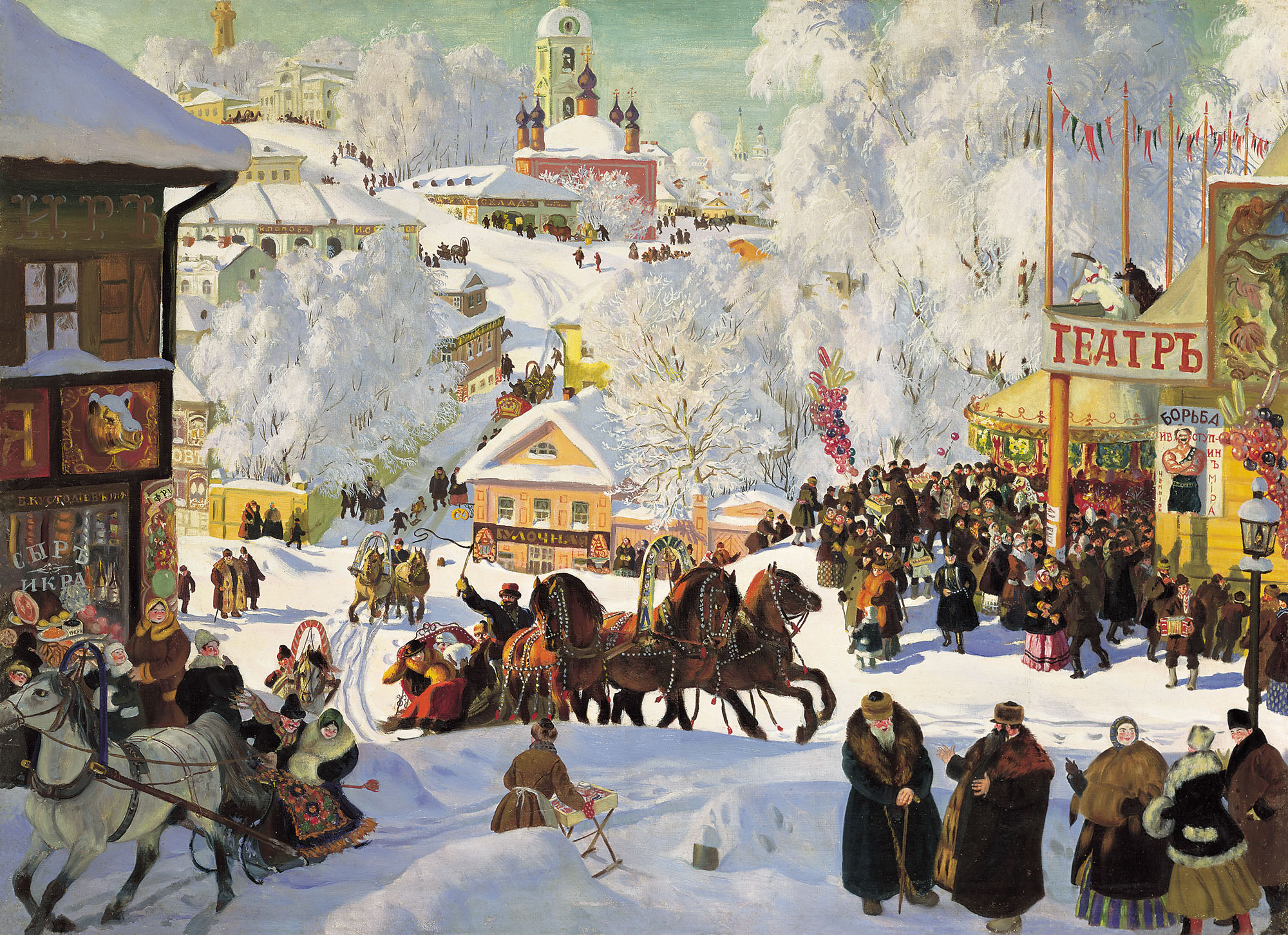
Maslenitsa by Boris Kustodiev, showing a Russian city in winter (1919).

The following table lists the average winter temperature in the 25 largest cities in Russia. Population and rank are from the All-Russian census of 2002. Average winter temperatures are from the references cited on each line.

== Table ==
Rank	City	Population (2002)	Avg Winter Temp (°C)
1	Moscow	10,126,424	−13.0
2	Saint Petersburg	4,661,219	−10.0
3	Novosibirsk	1,425,508	−20.0
4	Nizhny Novgorod	1,311,252	−15.0
5	Yekaterinburg	1,293,537	−17.0
6	Samara	1,157,880	−14.0
7	Omsk	1,134,016	−20.0
8	Kazan	1,105,289	−14.0
9	Chelyabinsk	1,077,174	−18.0
10	Rostov-on-Don	1,068,267	−7.0
11	Ufa	1,042,437	−14.0
12	Volgograd	1,011,417	−16.0
13	Perm	1,001,653	−15.0
14	Krasnoyarsk	909,341	−18.0
15	Saratov	873,055	−12.0
16	Voronezh	848,752	−6.0
17	Tolyatti	702,879	−18.0
18	Krasnodar	646,175	−7.0
19	Ulyanovsk	635,947	−11.0
20	Izhevsk	632,140	−14.0
21	Yaroslavl	613,088	−11.0
22	Barnaul	600,749	−15.5
23	Vladivostok	594,701	−14.0
24	Irkutsk	593,604	−15.0
25	Khabarovsk	583,072	−22.0
