= Slavic Carnival =

Traditional Christian festivals

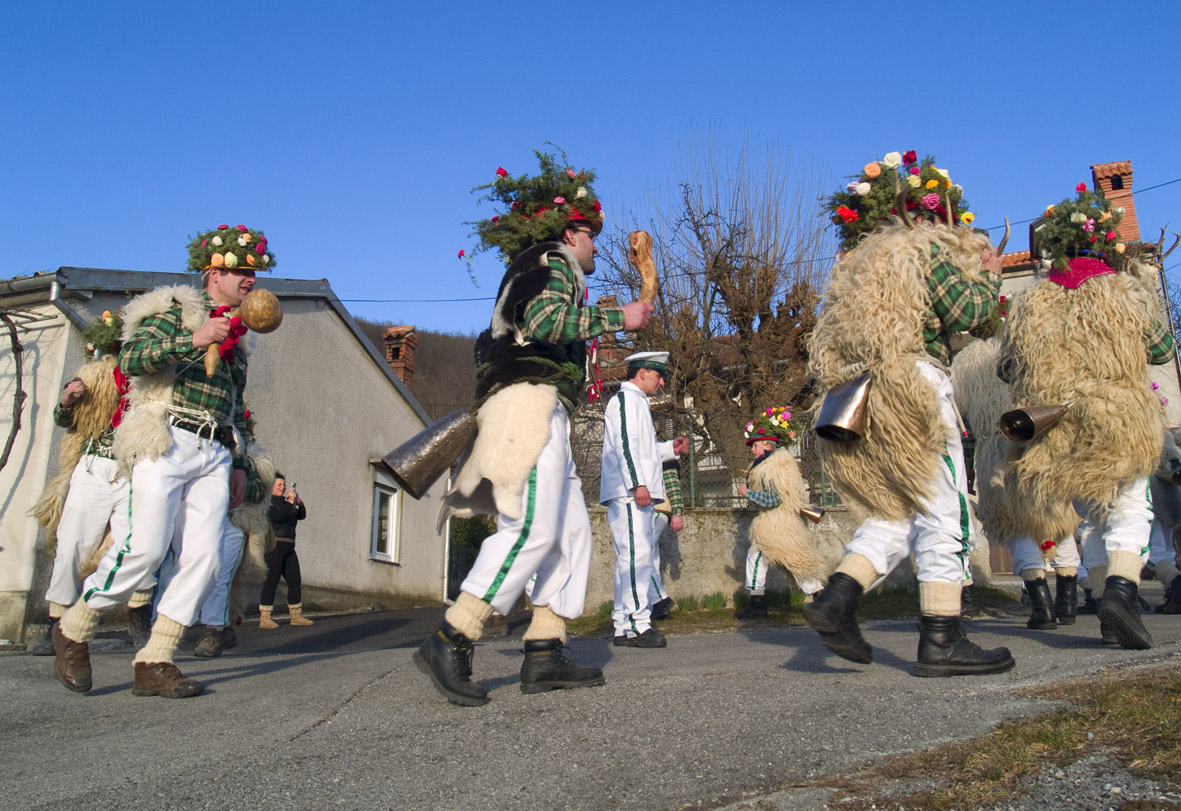
- Zvončari participants in Croatia
- Observed by: Slavic communities worldwide
- Type: Ethnic
- Significance: Last week before Great Lent
- Duration: 6–7 days
- Frequency: Annual
- Related to: Mardi Gras; Maslenitsa

Slavic carnivals are known under different names in various Slavic countries: Bulgarian: Сирни заговезни, Прошка, Поклади, romanized: Sirni zagovezni, Proshka, Pokladi; Macedonian: Прочка, romanized: Pročka; Russian: Масленица, Мясопуст, romanized: Maslenitsa, Myasopust; Polish: Ostatki, Mięsopust, Zapusty; Czech: Masopust, Šibřinky, Ostatky; Slovak: Fašiangy; Slovene: Mesopȗst, Pust, Pustni teden, Fašnk; Serbian: Покладе, Проћка / Poklade, Proćka; Croatian: Pust, Poklade, Mesopust, Fašnik; Upper Sorbian: postnicy; Lower Sorbian: zapust. They are traditional Christian festivals related to the period of Carnival.

== Sirni zagovezni in Bulgaria ==
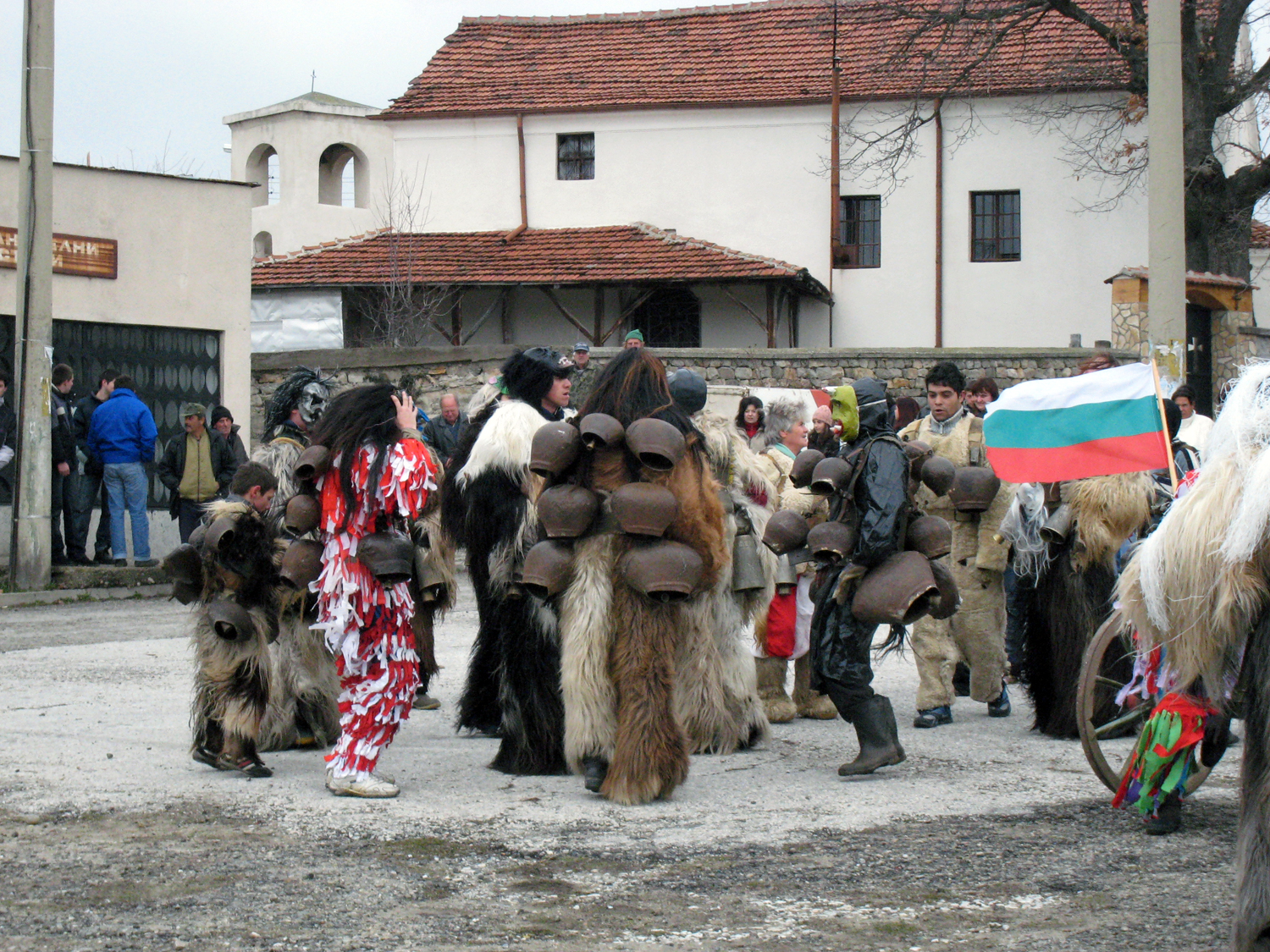
Kukeri in the Bulgarian village of Gorna Vasilitsa

Sirni zagovezni takes place seven weeks before Easter in Bulgaria. The tradition involves children asking forgiveness from their parents, all while wearing masks. The celebration symbolizes the victory of light over darkness in the coming of spring.

== Masopust in the Czech Republic ==
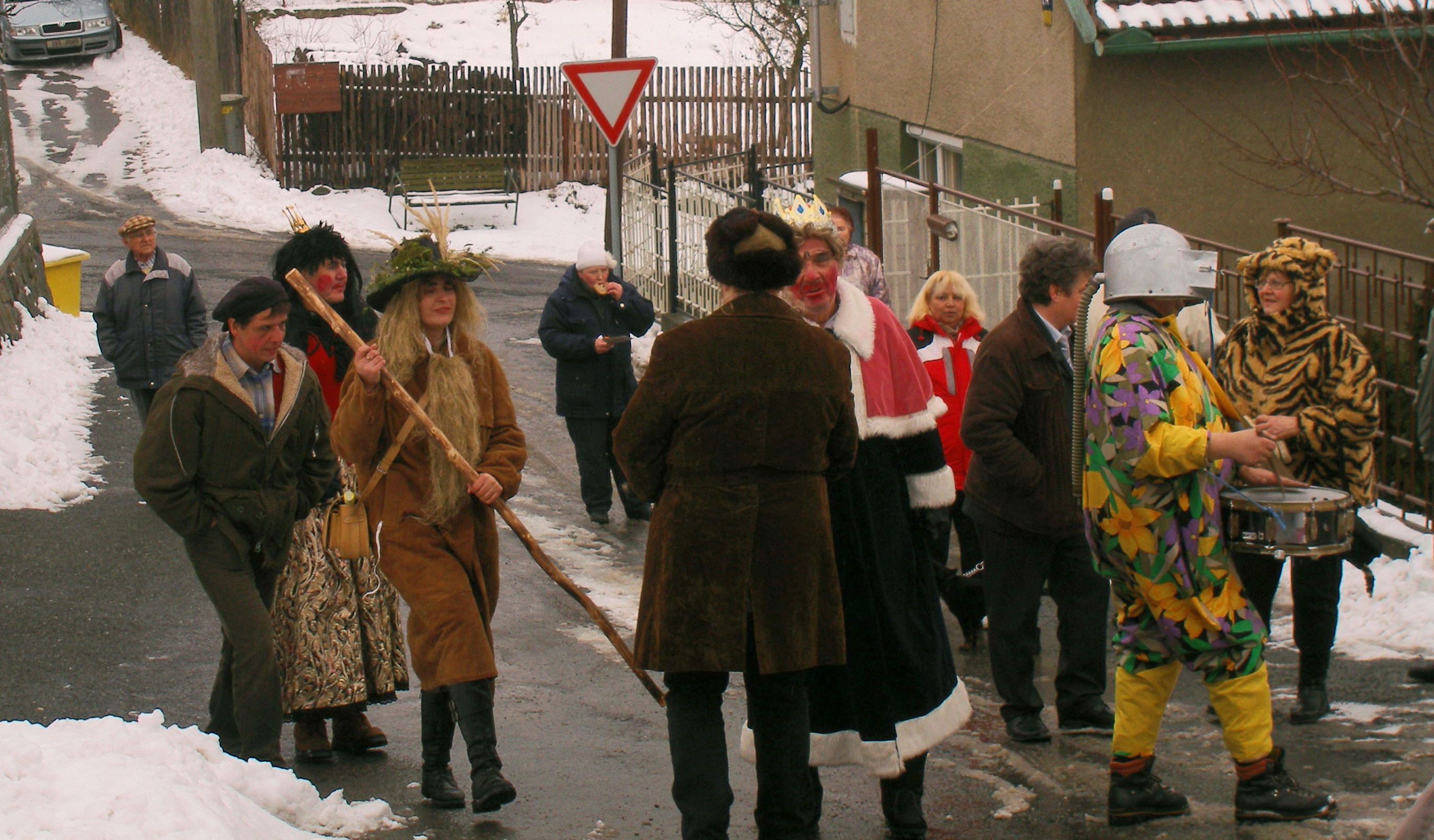
Masopust in Nový Knín, Czech Republic, 2009

The Czech celebration of Masopust was previously held from the Twelfth Night until Ash Wednesday, the first day of Lent, preceding Easter.

== Zapusty in Poland ==
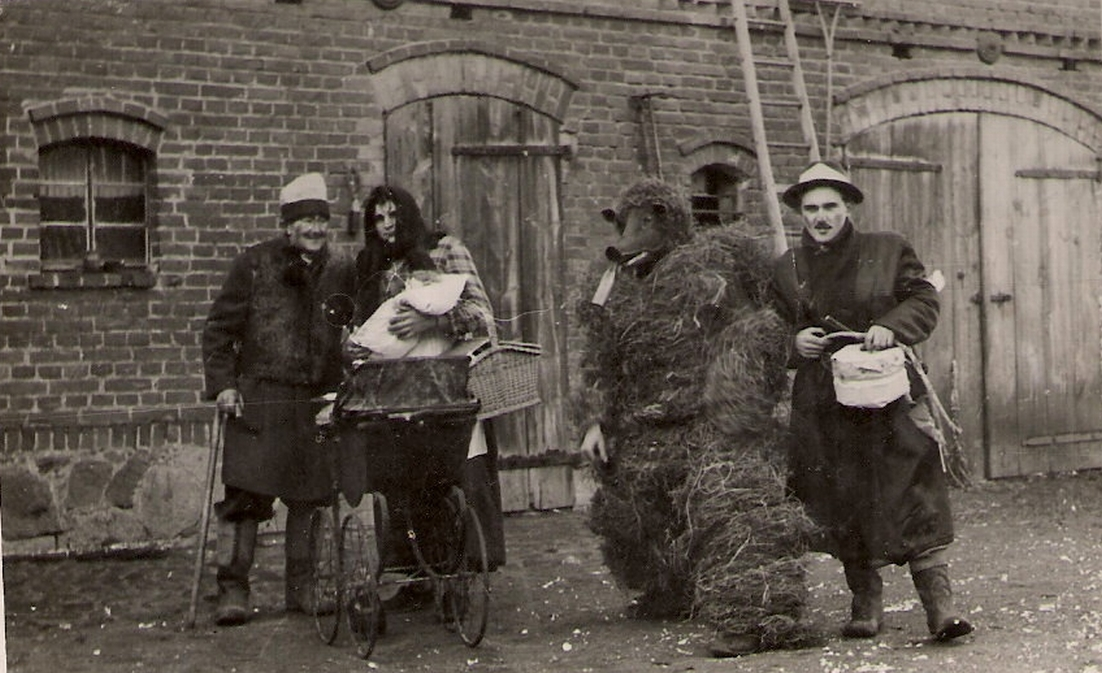
Zapusty, Poland, 1950

The Polish Carnival season of Zapusty includes Fat Thursday ((in Polish) Tłusty Czwartek), when pączki (doughnuts) are eaten, and Shrove Tuesday ((in Polish) Śledzik). The traditional way to celebrate Zapusty is the kulig, a horse-drawn sleigh ride through snow-covered countryside.

== Maslenitsa in Russia and Ukraine ==
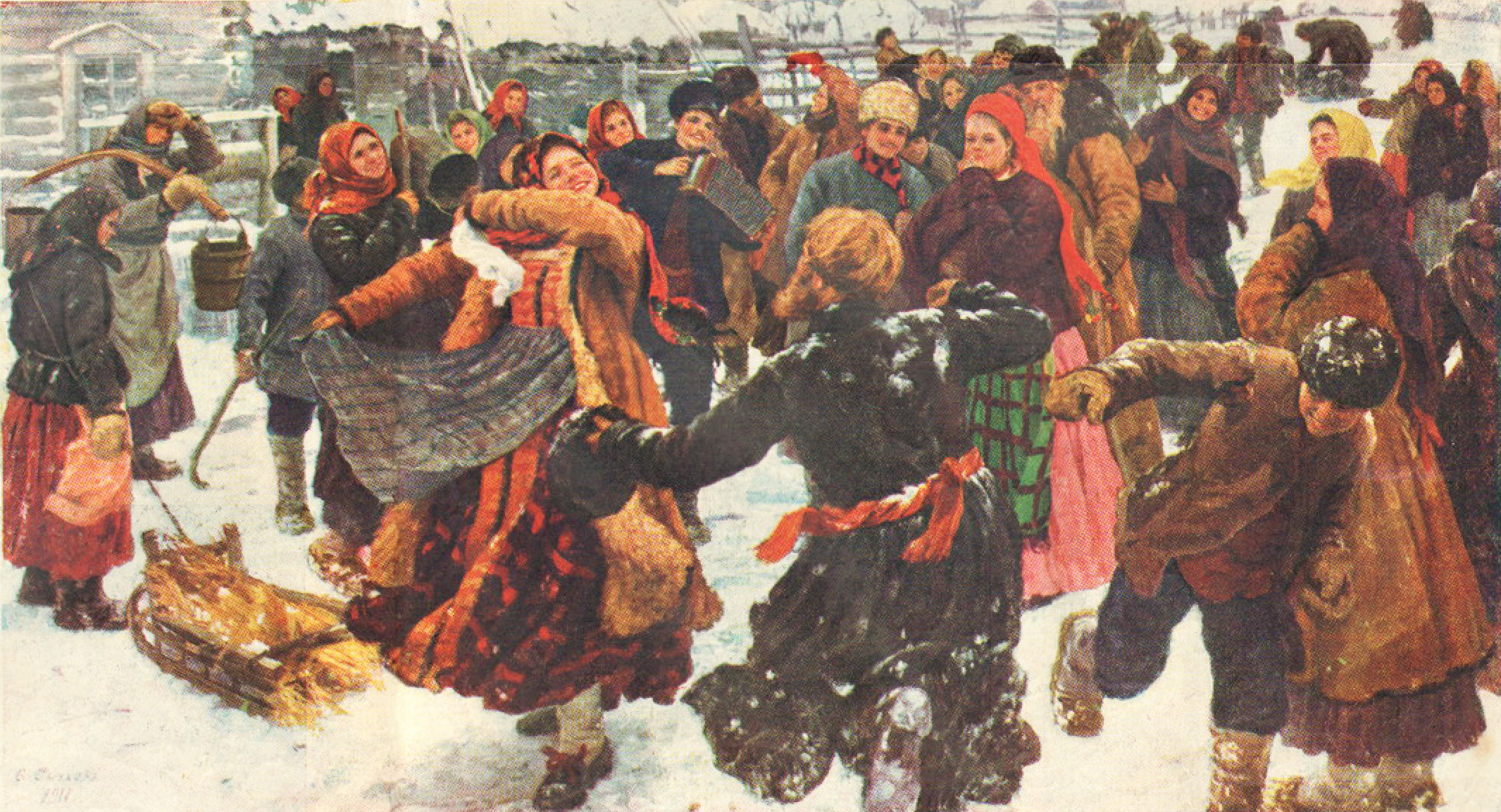
Fedot Sychkov. Plyaska. 1911

Maslenitsa is an Eastern Slavic religious and folk holiday, celebrated during the last week before Great Lent, eight weeks before Eastern Orthodox Easter. Maslenitsa corresponds to the Western Christian Carnival, except that Orthodox Lent begins on a Monday instead of a Wednesday, and the Orthodox date of Easter can differ greatly from the Western Christian date.

According to archaeological evidence from the 2nd century CE, Maslenitsa may be the oldest surviving Slavic holiday. The celebration has its origins in pagan traditions. In Slavic mythology, Maslenitsa is a sun festival, personified by the ancient god Volos, and a celebration of the imminent end of the winter.

== Kurentovanje in Slovenia ==
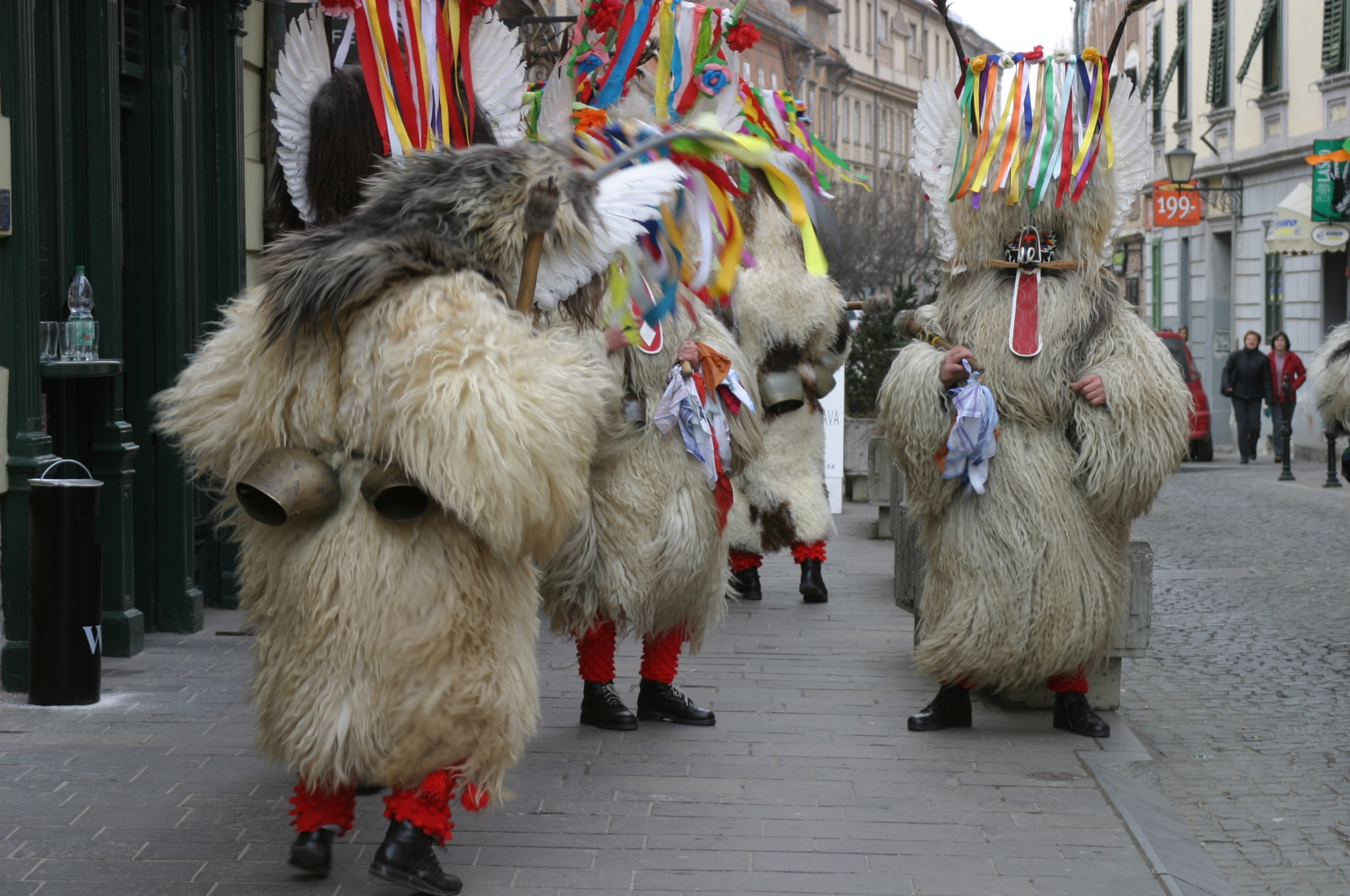
Kurents in Ptuj, Slovenia, 2004

Kurentovanje is one of Slovenia's most popular and ethnologically significant Carnival events. The ten-day rite of spring and fertility is celebrated on Shrove Sunday in Ptuj and draws around 10,000 participants each year.

Its main figure, known as Kurent or Korent, was seen as an extravagant god of unrestrained pleasure and hedonism in early Slavic customs. In today's festival, groups of kurents, or kurenti, wear traditional sheepskin garments while holding wooden clubs with hedgehog skins attached, called ježevke, the noise from which is believed to "chase away winter". In this way, the presence of kurenti announces the end of winter and the beginning of spring. Being a kurent was originally a privilege offered only to unmarried men, but today, married men, children, and women are also invited to wear the outfit.

As the host of Kurentovanje, the town of Ptuj was admitted into the Federation of European Carnival Cities in 1991. In 2010, the 50th anniversary of the first organized instance of this festival was celebrated.

== Zvončari in Croatia ==
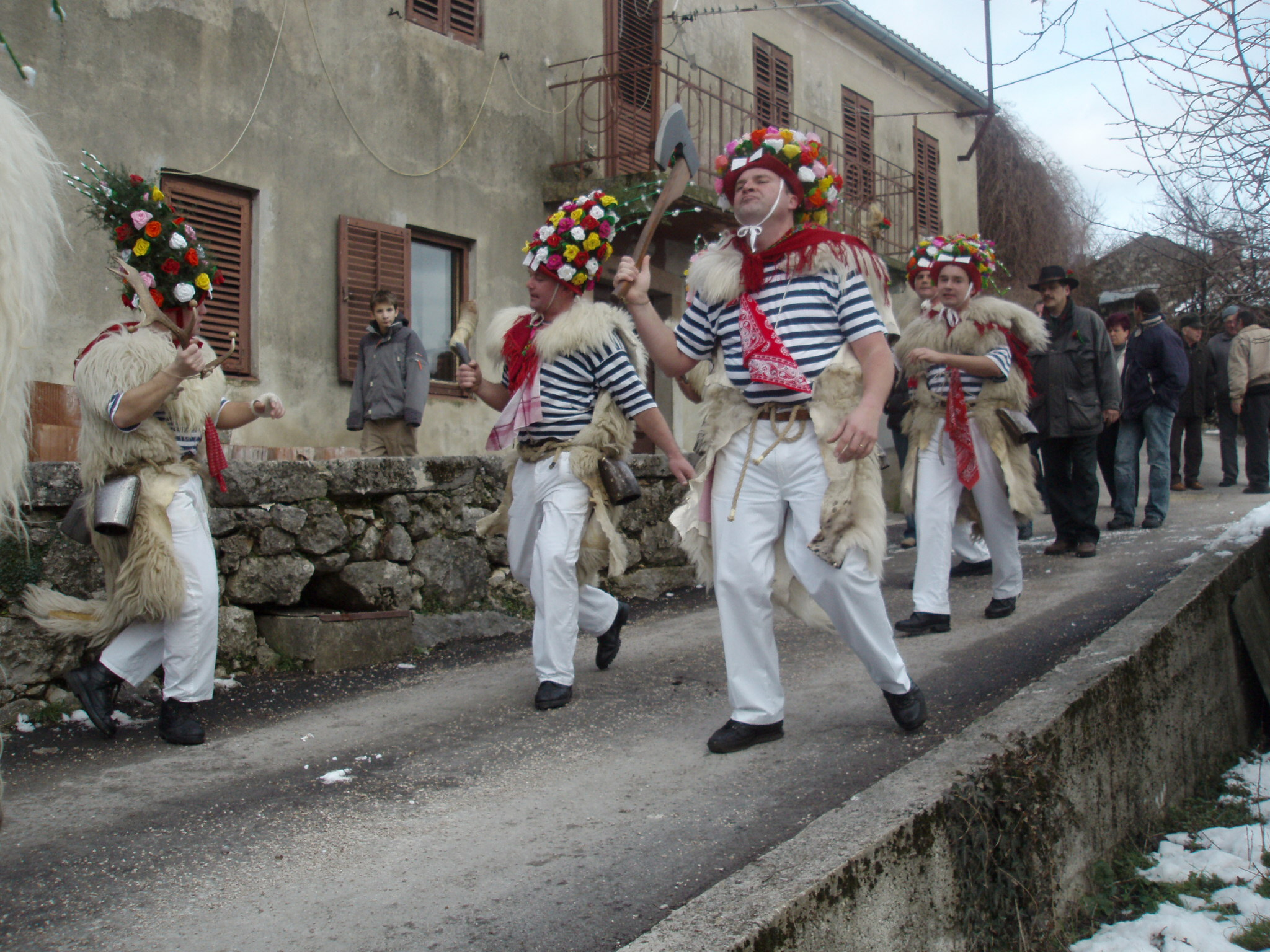
Zvončari "bell ringers" in Croatia, 2007

Zvončari is a folk custom maintained in the region around Rijeka, Croatia. It was added to UNESCO's Representative List of the Intangible Cultural Heritage of Humanity in 2009.

The custom dates to pagan antiquity, and its goal is to scare away the evil spirits of winter and to stir up a new springtime cycle. During the Rijeka Carnival, Zvončari "bell ringers" march from village to village throughout the region, following the same centuries-old route, making a large amount of noise.

== Busójárás in Hungary ==
The Busójárás is an annual celebration of the Šokci people living in the town of Mohács in Hungary, held at the conclusion of the Carnival season (Farsang), ending the day before Ash Wednesday. The celebration features Busós (people wearing traditional masks) and includes folk music, masquerading, parades, and dancing. Busójárás lasts six days, usually during February. It starts on a Thursday, followed by the Kisfarsang ("little Farsang") carnival on Friday, with the biggest celebration, Farsang vasárnap ("Farsang Sunday"), being held on the seventh Sunday before Easter Sunday; the celebration ends with Farsangtemetés ("burial of Farsang") on the following Tuesday (Shrove Tuesday or Mardi Gras). The festivities were added to UNESCO's Representative List of the Intangible Cultural Heritage of Humanity in 2009.
