= Triodion Period =

10 week ecclesiastical period celebrated by the Greek Orthodox Church

The Triodion period is a 10-week ecclesiastical period celebrated by the Greek Orthodox Church.

== Calendar ==
It begins on the Sunday of the Pharisee and the Publican and ends on Holy Saturday. This period includes the Apokreos, Great Lent and Holy Week. The first three weeks constitute the Apokreo, followed by six weeks of fasting (Lent) and finally Holy Week.

== Fasting practices ==
The first week of the Triodion lasts from the Sunday of the Pharisee and the Publican to the Sunday of the Prodigal, and is called the prophony. During this week, katylisis eis panta takes place, meaning that any food is eaten freely, even on Wednesday and Friday. For this reason, it is also called “free” or “absolute”.

The second week is called the Apokreo week, while the people also call it Kreatini, because it is the last week in which meat is consumed before Easter. This week, "abstinence from everything" is observed on all days except Wednesday and Friday. On Thursday of the second week in Greece, the custom of Tsiknopempti is practiced, during which meat is consumed mainly from the grill and the pan, since after three days the fast essentially begins. The Saturday of this week is the first Psychosabbato, while the following day is the Sunday of Apokreo.

The third week is that of Tyrofagos or Tyrini, the so-called white fast, meaning that all dairy products, eggs, fish and of course olive oil are absolved on all days, but meat is prohibited. This week ends with Tyrini Sunday, which also marks the end of the preparatory period for Lent and the carnival events.

From the fourth week, with Clean Monday, Great Lent begins with its strictest fasting.
