= Carnival rose =

Polish sweet pastry

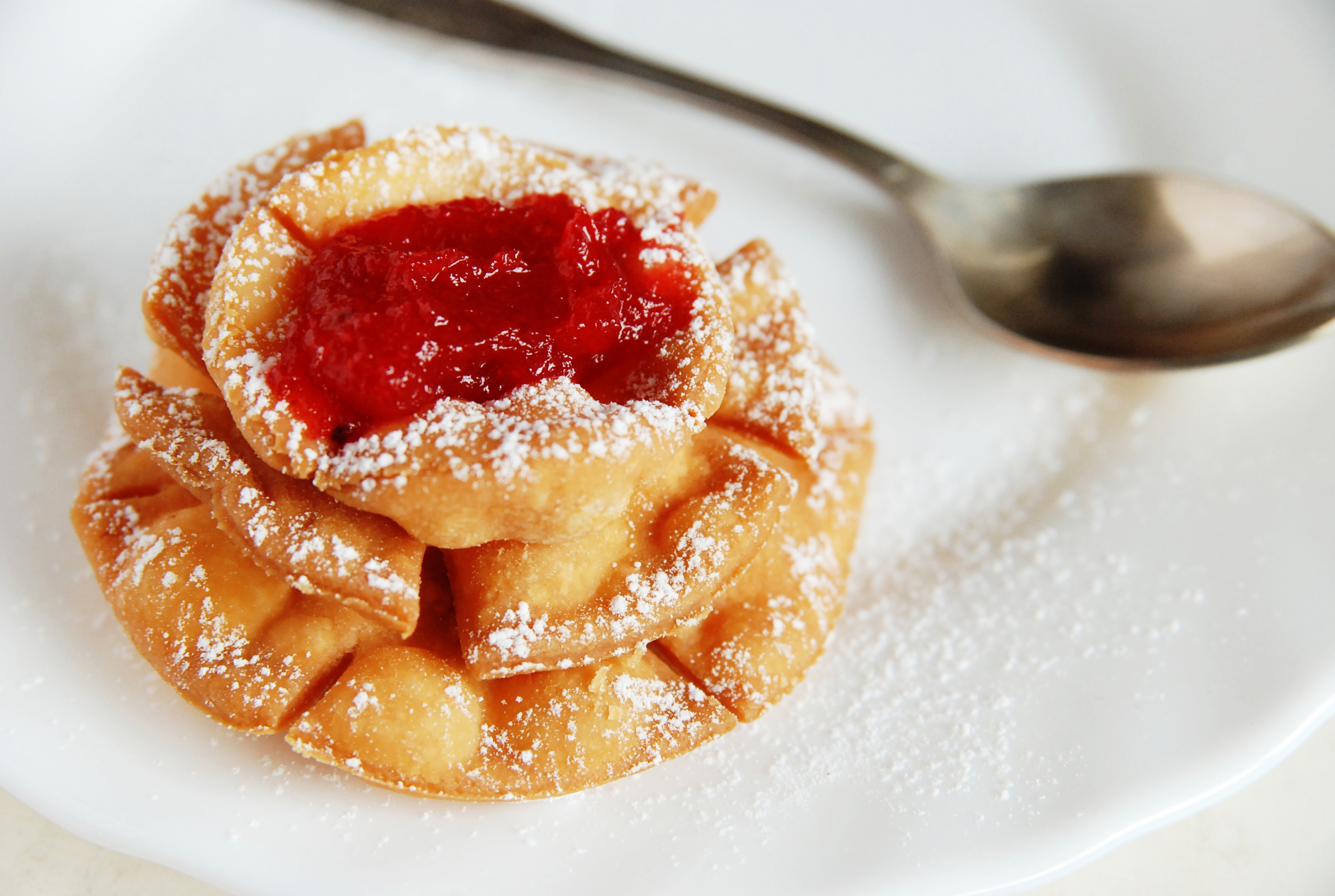
A finished carnival rose

The carnival rose (Polish: Róża karnawałowa) is a Polish sweet pastry traditionally prepared for carnival celebrations, in particular on Fat Thursday.

Carnival roses are made with three discs of faworki dough of decreasing size. The dough is made from flour, eggs, salt, sugar and a bit of rectified spirit (95% alcohol). After the discs are pressed together and cut to resemble the petals of a rose, they are deep-fried, either in oil or preferably in lard. After cooking, the pastries are dusted with icing sugar, and a glace cherry, cherry jam, or marmalade made from wild roses, is placed in the middle before serving.

== See also ==
- List of pastries
