= Tsiknopempti =

Greek traditional feast

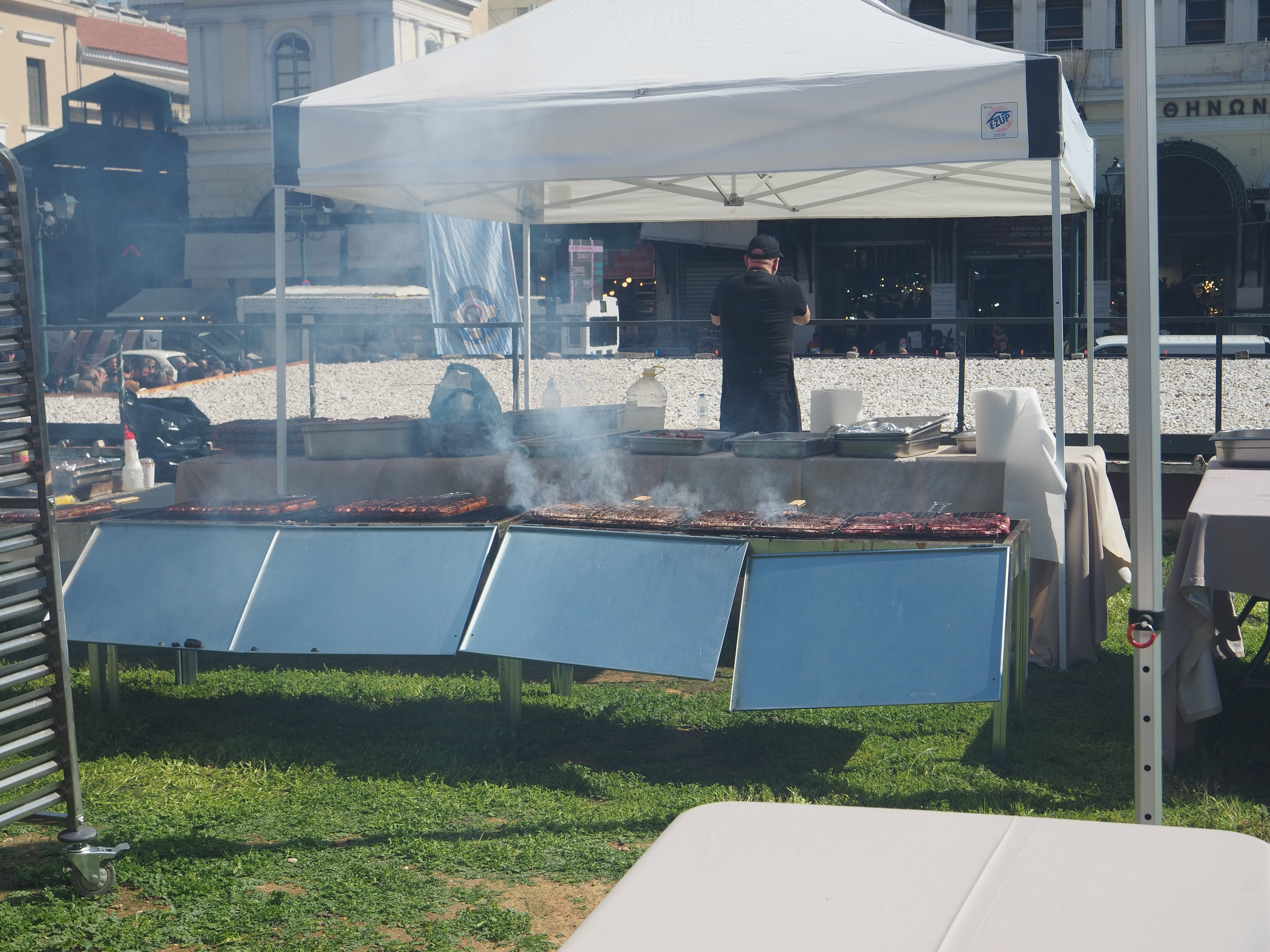
Meat grilling in Athens

Tsiknopempti (Greek: Τσικνοπέμπτη, romanized: Tsiknopémpti [t͡sik.noˈpem.pti]) is part of the traditional celebrations of Apókries (Απόκριες), the Greek Carnival season. Tsiknopempti occurs on the second to last Thursday before Lent and can be translated as Charred Thursday or Smoky Thursday. It centers on the consumption of large amounts of grilled and roasted meats before Lenten fasting commences.

== Celebration ==
Apokries (Carnival season) in Greece is made up of three themed weeks of celebration. These weeks are, in order: Prophoní (Προφωνή, 'Preannouncement Week'), Kreatiní (Κρεατινή, 'Meat Week'), and Tiriní (Τυρινή, 'Cheese Week'). Tsiknopempti is the Thursday of Kreatiní and represents a highlight in a weeklong celebration of meat consumption. The festivities on Tsiknopempti revolve around large outdoor parties where massive amounts of meat are grilled or roasted.

Often Tsiknopempti-like celebrations will occur again, generally on a smaller scale, the following Sunday which marks the final day meat can be eaten before the beginning of the Great Lent, the strict fasting season that leads up to Easter. In the Greek Orthodox tradition, fasting on Wednesdays and Fridays is important, therefore Thursday is the best day for Tsiknopempti. Tsiknopempti is celebrated 11 days before Clean Monday (often referred to in English as Ash Monday, to allude to Ash Wednesday in the West, however in Orthodox tradition there is no imposition of ashes). After Tsiknopempti, the next major celebration of Apokries is Tirofágos (Τυροφάγος) during the week of Tiriní which focuses on the consumption of cheese, eggs, and dairy.

In Lebanon, a similar tradition exists and is known as Khamis el sakara (Thursday of drinking).

Similar celebrations known as Fat Thursday are held in many other countries.

== Etymology ==
The Greek word Τσικνοπέμπτη (Tsiknopempti) is made up of the words τσίκνα (tsíkna, lit. 'the smell of roasting meat') and Πέμπτη (Pémpti, 'Thursday').

== See also ==
- Fat Thursday, a similar traditional Christian feast associated with the celebration of Carnival
- Mardi Gras
- Maslenitsa
- Shrove Tuesday
