= Khamis el sakara =

Lebanese holiday

Khamis El Sakara is a Lebanese and Syrian Christian holiday, typically celebrated in the Melkite and Maronite Church. In Levantine Arabic, this is translated to Thursday (Khamis) of Drunkenness (El Sakara). Originally, the holiday was called Khamis El Zakara (which means “remembrance”, in Arabic) and was a day of remembrance of the deceased, this was gradually replaced with sakara.

Khamis El Sakara is celebrated on the last Thursday before the first day of Lent and is celebrated similarly to other Fat Thursday and Fat Tuesday holidays where Christians gather to finish meat and dairy before the forty days of fasting and reflection. In Lebanon, this meal includes cooked and raw meats (e.g. Kibbeh nayyeh) and alcoholic beverages, including Wine and Arak (drink).

In the Maronite Catholic Church, ashes are distributed on Monday, two days ahead of the Latin rite's traditional Ash Wednesday distribution. This allows Catholics to observe 40 days of Lent, but also celebrate two church feasts for which fasting is not required: the feast of St. Joseph and the feast of the Annunciation.

== See also ==
- Fat Thursday, a similar traditional Christian feast associated with the celebration of Carnival
- Mardi Gras
- Maslenitsa
- Shrove Tuesday
