= Kulig =

Polish winter tradition

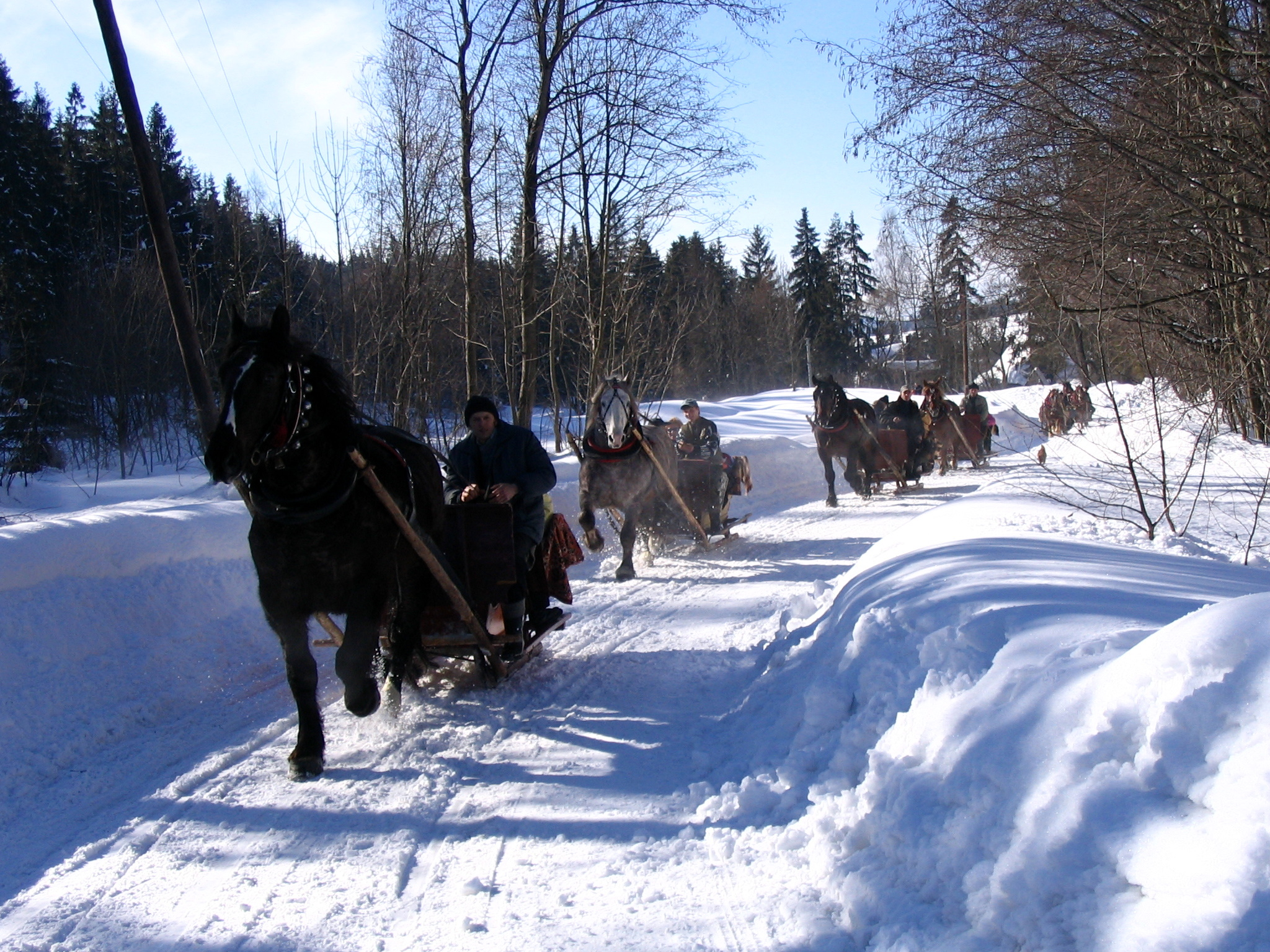

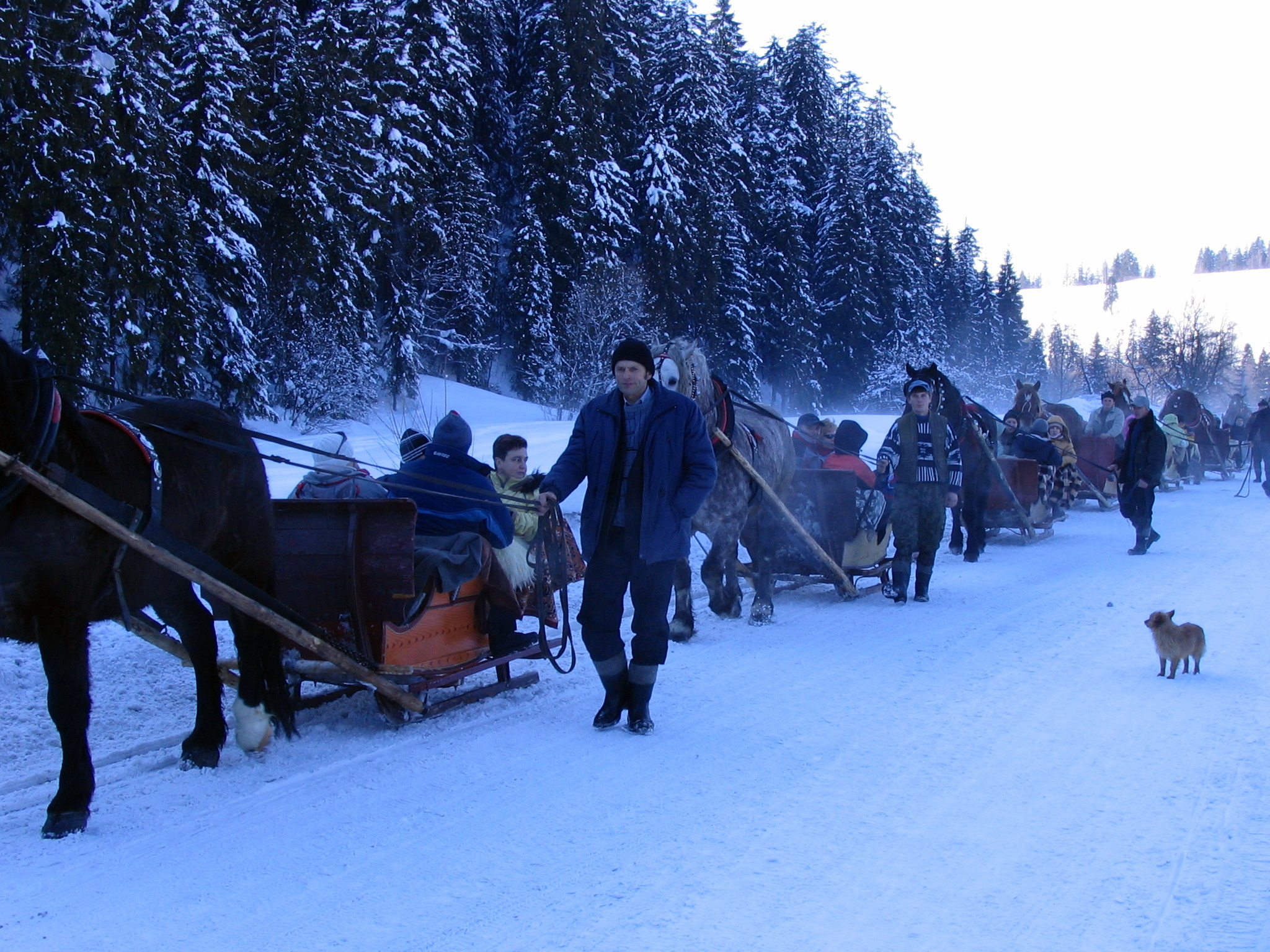

Kulig in Gorce Mountains, February 2006

Kulig (sleigh rides) is a Polish winter tradition dating back to the 16th century.

The kulig was a sleigh ride party organised for young people, mainly by the aristocratic class, as part of the Carnival season between Christmas and Ash Wednesday. Horse-pulled sleighs and sleds went from one manor house to another, and each would provide the party with a banquet which might include babka, chrusty and sausages, followed by dancing. A sleigh ride could last up to a dozen days. It usually began with the distribution of a curled stick, called a kulą, "crutch", among the participants. This was the signal to gather. People got on horses or climbed into sleighs and were driven to the meeting place.

Kulig rides which combine tradition with a form of modern entertainment, are marketed as a tourist attraction in highland locations in the Polish Tatra mountains, such as Zakopane.

Kulig in Poland, Podkowa Leśna, Feb., 2010
