= Leonid Solomatkin =

Russian painter

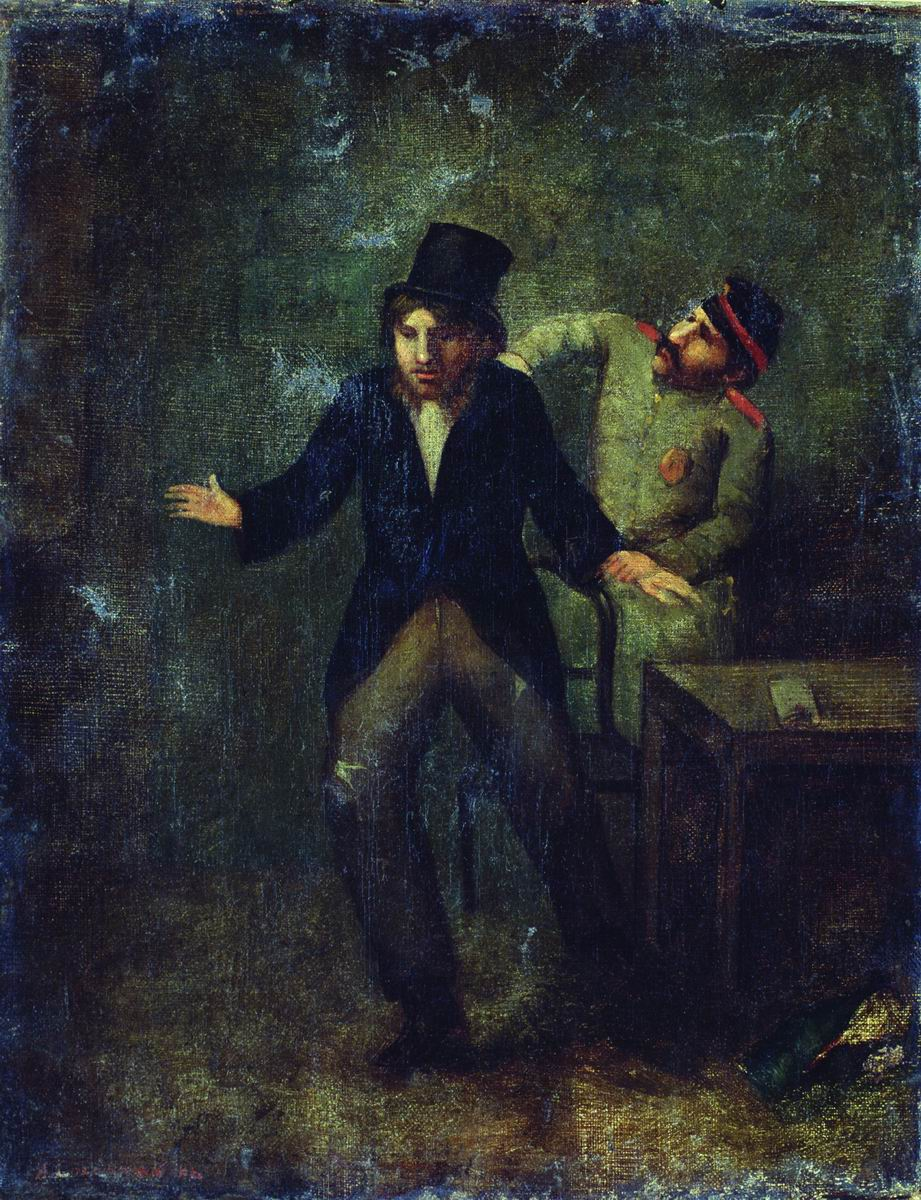
Self-portrait (date unknown)

Leonid Ivanovich Solomatkin (Russian: Леонид Иванович Соломаткин; 1837, Sudzha – 18 June 1883, Saint Petersburg) was a Russian genre painter in the Realistic style.

== Biography ==
He was born to a poor family and orphaned at an early age. At first, he worked as a shepherd, then as an icon seller. For several years he worked as a chumak, travelling from village to village, making sketches of the interesting people he saw along the way. With a bundle of those sketches in hand, he went to Moscow and presented them to Nikolai Ramazanov, a sculptor, teacher and art critic who was known for his willingness to support young artists. Ramazanov was sufficiently impressed to take him into his home.

In 1855, Ramazanov obtained him a place at the Moscow School of Painting, Sculpture and Architecture, where he worked until 1860 while studying with Apollon Mokritsky. From 1861 to 1866, he became a "volunteer apprentice" at the Imperial Academy of Arts in Saint Petersburg. While there, he studied the Dutch Masters at the Hermitage and was influenced by the works of Pavel Fedotov. He abandoned his studies after being named an "Artist, Third-Degree".

His paintings mostly dealt with the lives of ordinary people. Perhaps his most popular painting was one of ostentatiously pious policemen who went to the house of a merchant at Christmas to "glorify Christ" and get a tip. It was copied and reproduced many times, by himself and others, although the original has been lost. In fact, he often made several copies of his paintings (with variations), and most of them were small, to make this easier.

He never held any formal exhibitions after leaving the Academy. Despite some successes, he became an alcoholic, lived in poverty and was often homeless. He died of tuberculosis in a hospital for the poor at the age of forty-six.

== Selected paintings ==
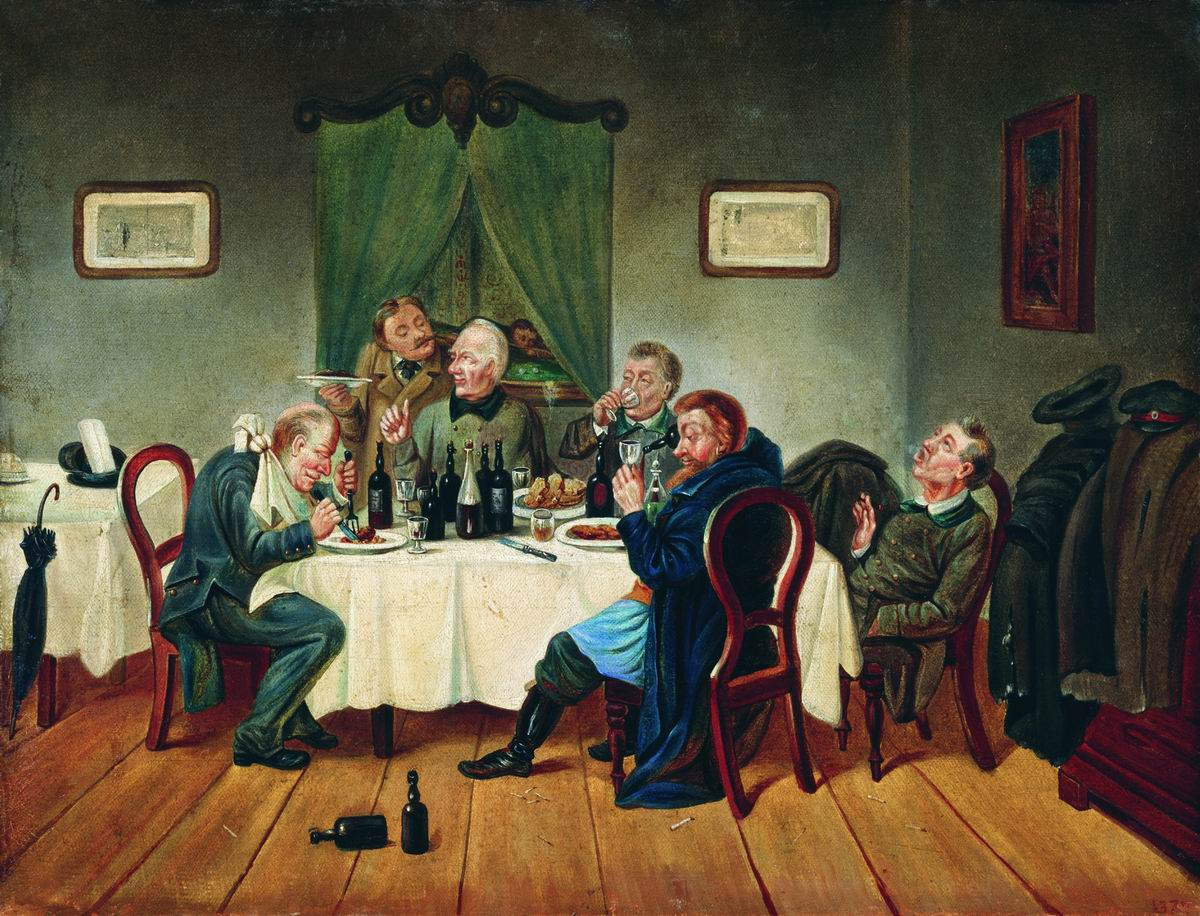
Bachelor Party

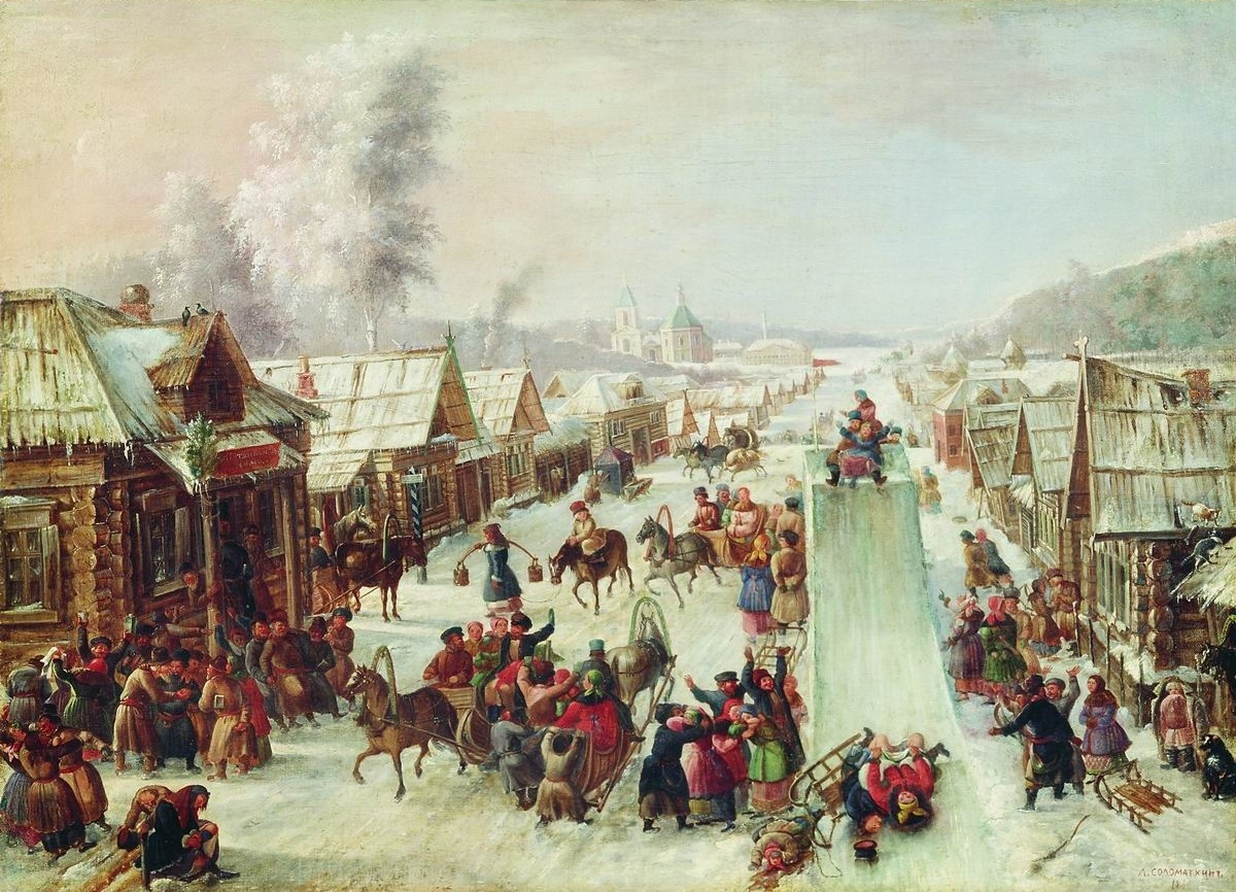
Maslenitsa

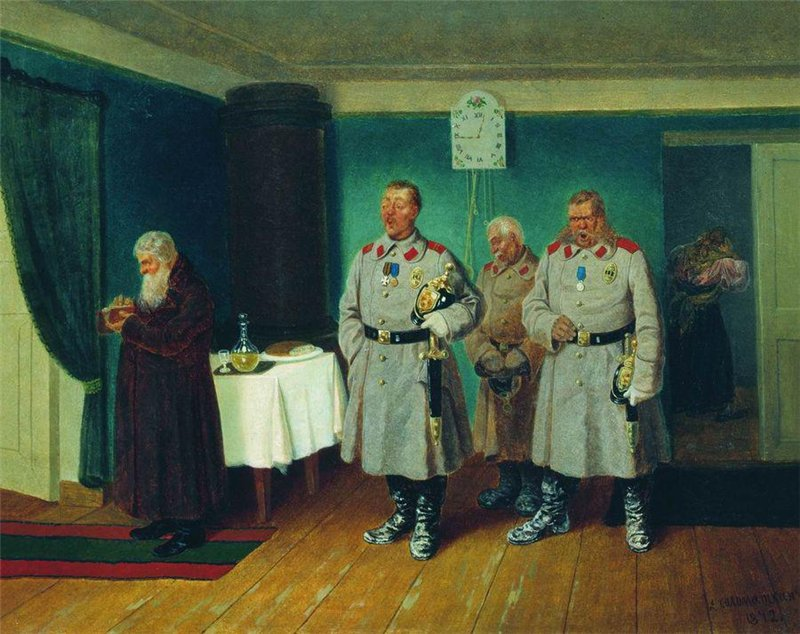
"The Glorifying Policemen"
(rough translation), often called "Christmas Chorus"

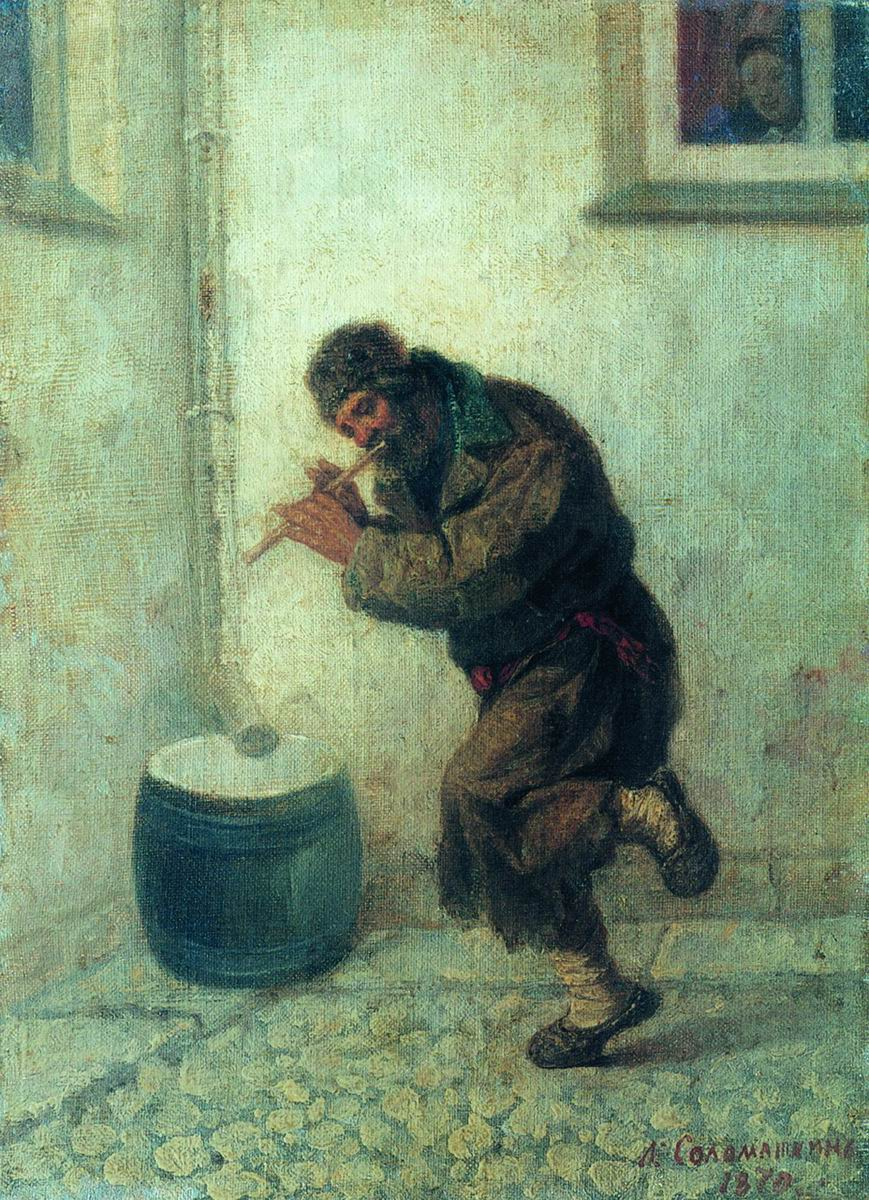
Dancing for Money
