= Maslenitsa =

Slavic folk and Christian holiday

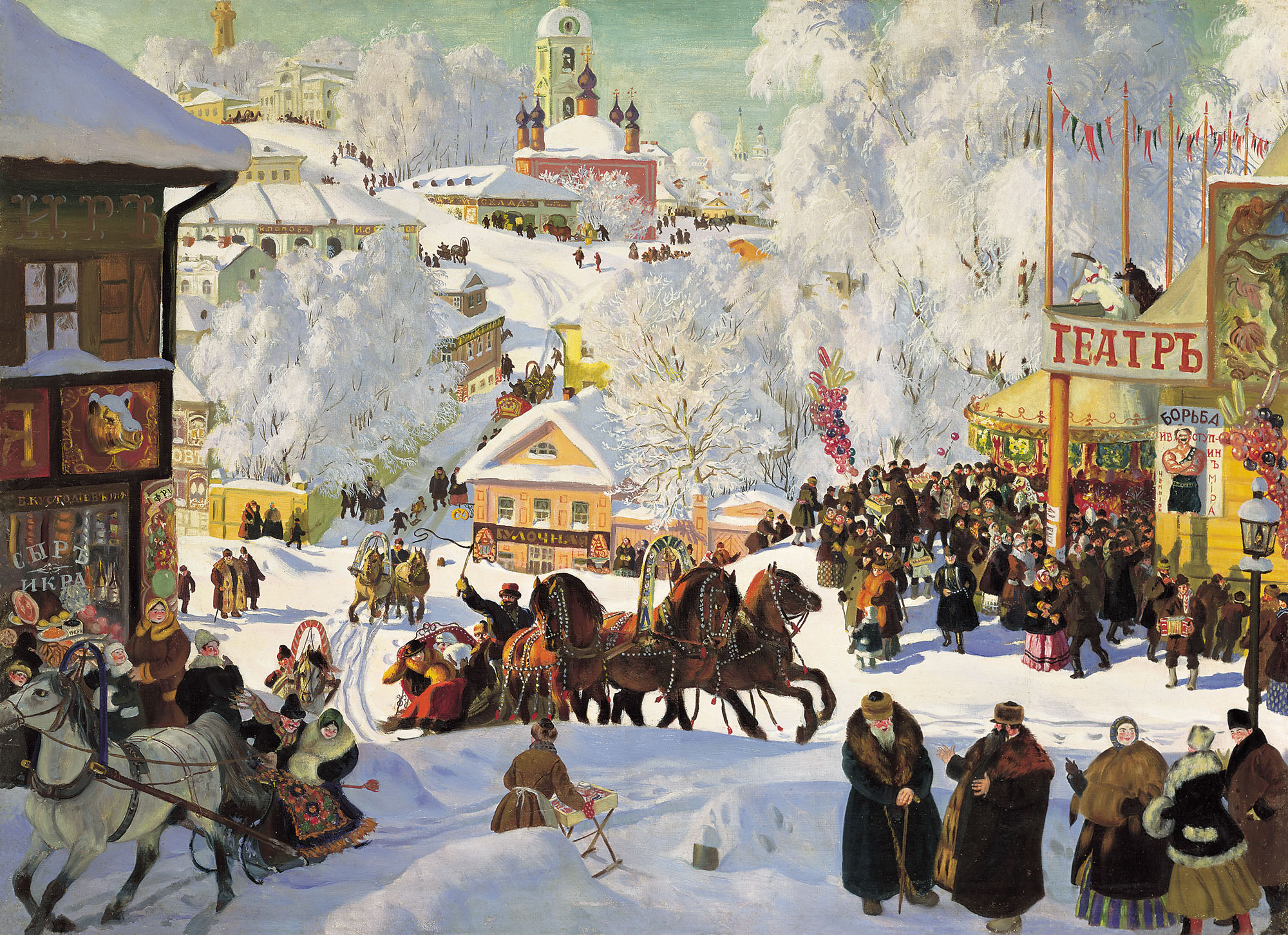
- Maslenitsa, Boris Kustodiev, 1919 (Isaak Brodsky Museum, St. Petersburg)
- Also called: Butter Week, Crepe week, Cheesefare Week, Syropust, Kolodiya, Masnytsia
- Observed by: Eastern Slavs; Mostly Russia, Ukraine and Belarus, as well as Russian, Ukrainian and Belarusian diaspora communities
- Type: Ethnic
- Significance: Seeing off winter, last week before Great Lent
- Celebrations: Making blini (crepes), making visits, sleigh rides, dressing up, bonfires, snowball fights, the capture of the Snow Fortress, burning of the Maslenitsa Scarecrow; In Ukraine and Belarus: eating varenyky with cottage cheese
- 2025 date: 24 February to 2 March
- 2026 date: 16 February to 22 February
- Duration: 7 days
- Frequency: Annual
- Related to: Mardi Gras

Maslenitsa (Belarusian: Масленіца; Russian: Мaсленица [ˈmas⁽ʲ⁾lʲɪnʲɪt͡sə]; Rusyn: Пущаня; Ukrainian: Масниця), also known as Butter Lady, Butter Week, Crepe week, or Cheesefare Week, is an Eastern Slavic religious and folk holiday which has retained a number of elements of Slavic mythology in its ritual. It is celebrated during the last week before Great Lent; that is, the eighth week before Eastern Orthodox Pascha, equivalent to the West's Sexagesima.

The date of Maslenitsa changes every year, depending on the date of the celebration of Easter. It corresponds to the Western Christian Carnival, except that Orthodox Lent begins on a Monday instead of a Wednesday, and the Orthodox date of Easter can differ greatly from the Western Christian date.

The traditional attributes of the Maslenitsa celebration are the Maslenitsa effigy, sleigh rides, and festivities. Russians bake blini and flatbread, while Belarusians and Ukrainians cook pierogi and syrniki.

== Traditions ==
According to archaeological evidence from the 2nd century AD, Maslenitsa may be the oldest surviving Slavic holiday. In the Christian tradition, Maslenitsa is the last week before the onset of Great Lent.

During the week of Maslenitsa, work is already forbidden to Orthodox Christians, and it is the last week during which work is permitted, leading to its name of "work free week" or "Freedom week".

Maslenitsa represents the last chance to take part in social activities that are not appropriate during the more prayerful, sober and introspective Lenten season. Lent excludes working, parties, secular music, dancing and other distractions from spiritual life.

In Ukraine Maslenitsa week was also called Babskyi Tyzhden (Women's Week) or Kolodiy. Married women gathered to "birth," "baptize," and "bury" a wooden log (koloda) throughout the week, symbolizing marriage and family traditions. By the end of the week, unmarried men and women had logs tied to their legs as a playful punishment for not marrying before Maslenitsa. This tradition highlighted the importance of marriage in Ukrainian culture. Though this tradition is no longer widely practiced, Kolodiy still remains a symbolic reminder of festive Slavic customs and the value of strong family bonds.

In some regions, each day of Maslenitsa had its traditional activity. Monday may be the welcoming of "Lady Maslenitsa". The community builds the Maslenitsa effigy out of straw, decorated with pieces of rags, and fixed to a pole formerly known as Kostroma. It is paraded around, and the first pancakes may be made and offered to the poor. On Tuesday, young men might search for a fiancée to marry after Lent. On Wednesday, sons-in-law may visit their mother-in-law, who has prepared pancakes and invited other guests for a party. Thursday may be devoted to outdoor activities. People may take time off work and spend the day sledding, ice skating, conducting snowball fights and going on sleigh rides. On Friday, sons-in-law may invite their mothers-in-law for dinner. Saturday may be a gathering of a young wife with her sisters-in-law to work on a good relationship.

== Sunday of Forgiveness ==
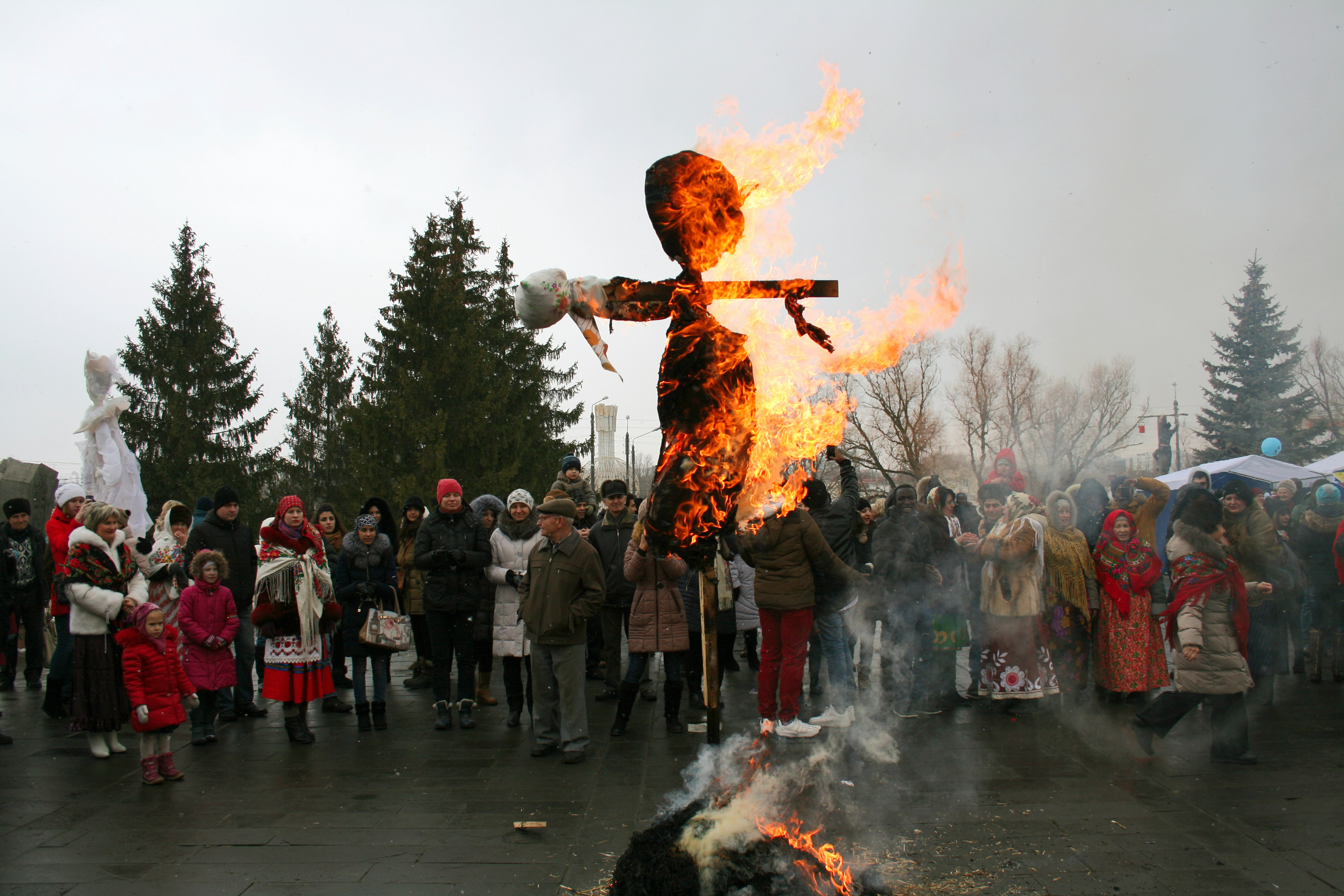
Burning of the Maslenitsa effigy, during the Celebration of Forgiveness Sunday in Belgorod, February 21, 2015

The last day of Cheesefare Week is called "Forgiveness Sunday" (Прощёное воскресенье). Relatives and friends ask each other for forgiveness and might offer them small presents. As the culmination of the celebration, people gather to "strip Lady Maslenitsa of her finery" and burn her in a bonfire. Left-over pancakes may also be thrown into the fire, and Lady Maslenitsa's ashes are buried in the snow to "fertilize the crops".

At Vespers on Sunday evening, people may make a poklon (bow) before one another and ask forgiveness. Another name for Forgiveness Sunday is "Cheesefare Sunday", because for devout Orthodox Christians it is the last day on which dairy products may be consumed until Easter. Fish, wine and olive oil will also be forbidden on most days of Great Lent. The day following Cheesefare Sunday is called Clean Monday, because people have confessed their sins, asked forgiveness, and begun Great Lent with a clean slate.

== Modern times ==
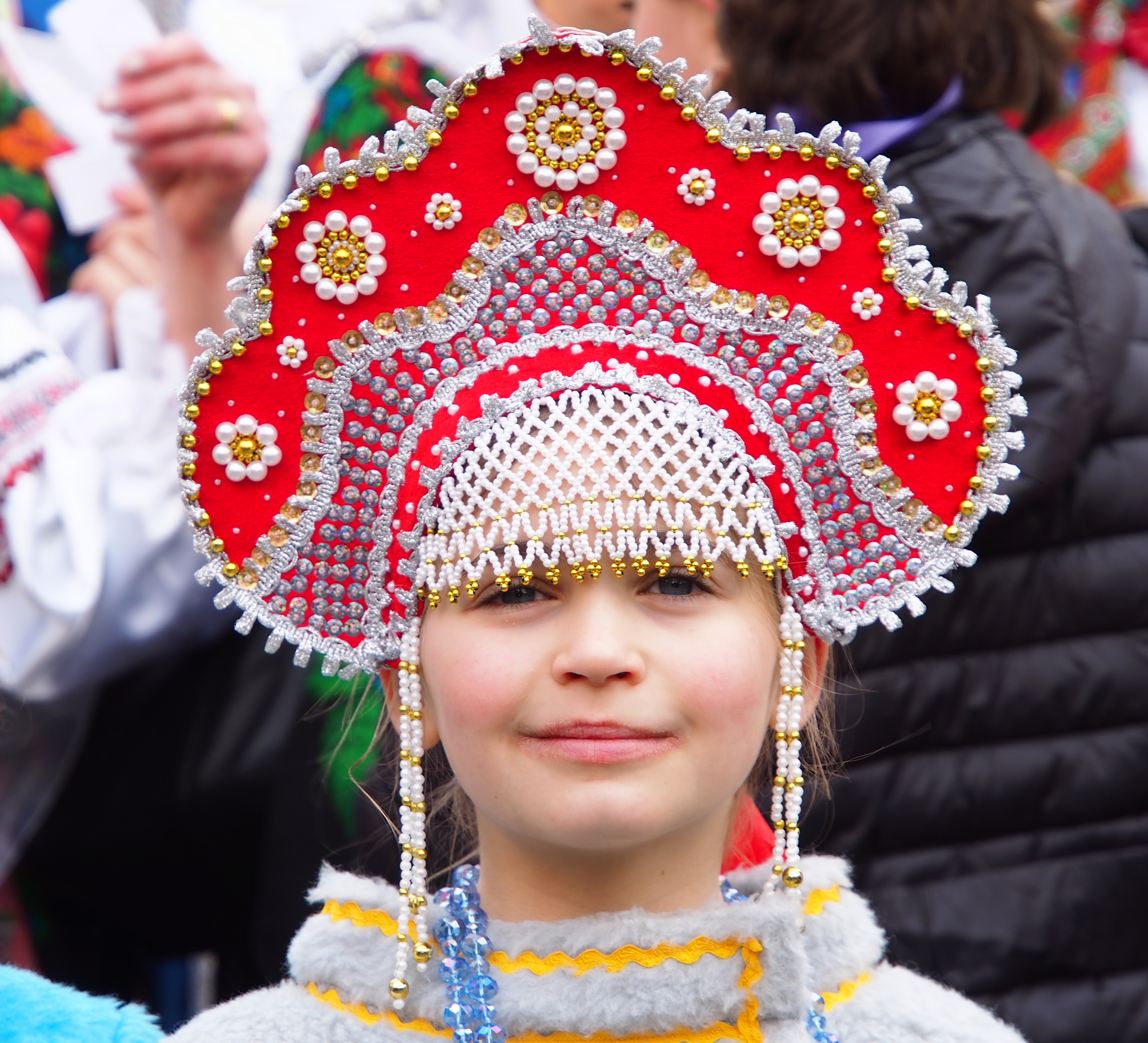
A girl wearing a traditional Russian kokoshnik hat for Maslenitsa in Slovenia

Due to cultural factors in the Russian Empire, large public celebrations of Maslenitsa were no longer as common by the turn of the 20th century. After the Russian Revolution in 1917 and the following state atheism in the Soviet Union, public Maslenitsa celebrations became even less common, although Maslenitsa continued to observed particularly in smaller private celebrations in homes and villages. In the 1960s and 1970s, as the USSR brought back some traditional folk holidays, Maslenitsa was again observed in large public celebrations that retained some of the holiday's secular elements, but with additional "contemporary socialist elements grafted onto it".

After the start of perestroika and fall of the Soviet Union in the 1980s and 1990s, large outdoor celebrations started up again, and much of the older Maslenitsa traditions began to be revived in a modern context. Since 2002, Moscow has staged a yearly Maslenitsa festival next to the Red Square, with that and other celebrations attracting around 300,000 visitors in 2011.

With increasing secularization, many Russians do not abstain from meat and Maslenitsa celebrations can be accompanied by shashlik vendors. Nevertheless, "meat still does not play a major role in the festivities". Many countries with a significant number of Russian immigrants consider Maslenitsa a suitable occasion to celebrate Russian culture, although the celebrations are usually reduced to one day and may not coincide with the date of the religious celebrations.

== Gallery ==
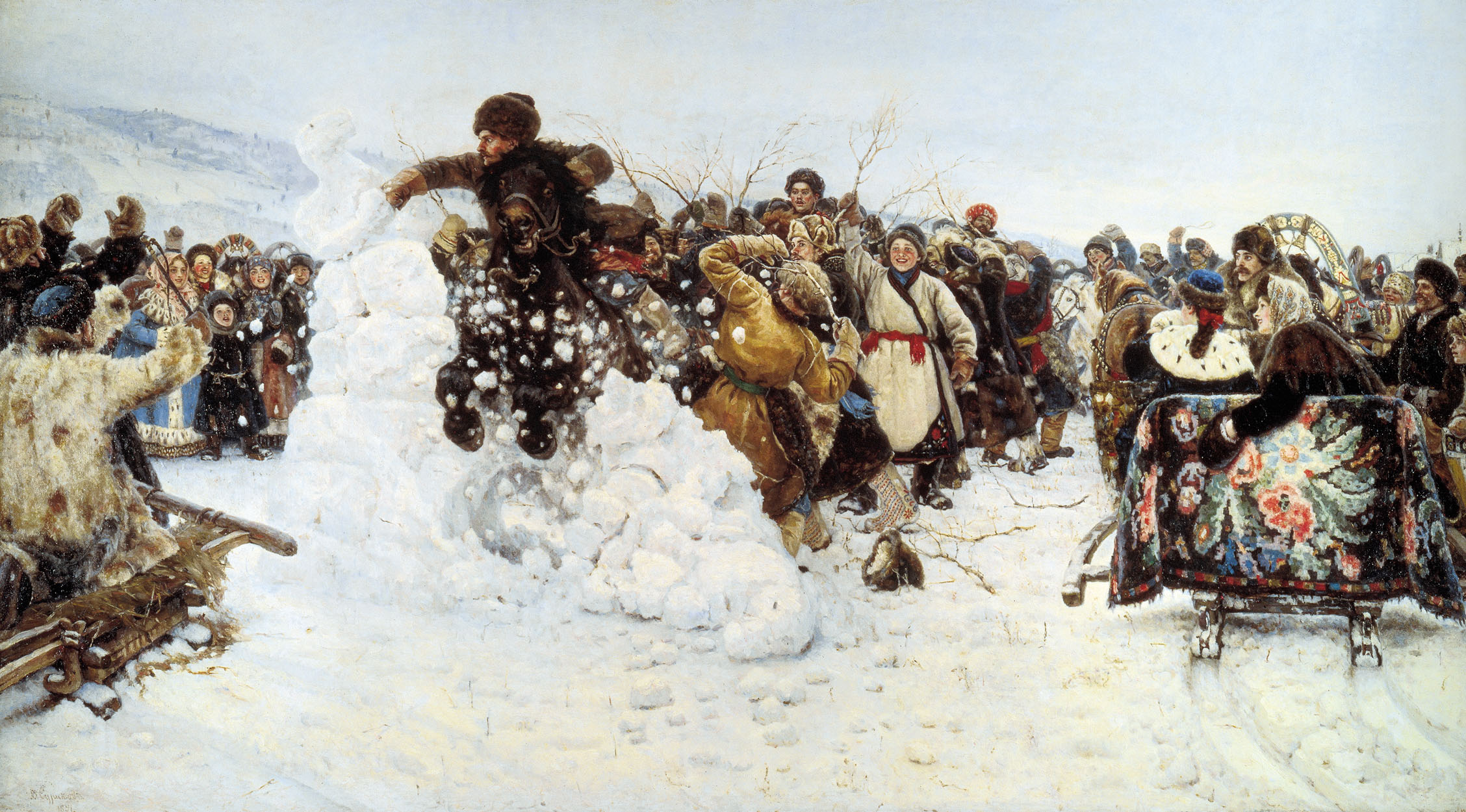
Vasily Surikov. Взятие снежного городка Taking a Snow Town, 1891.

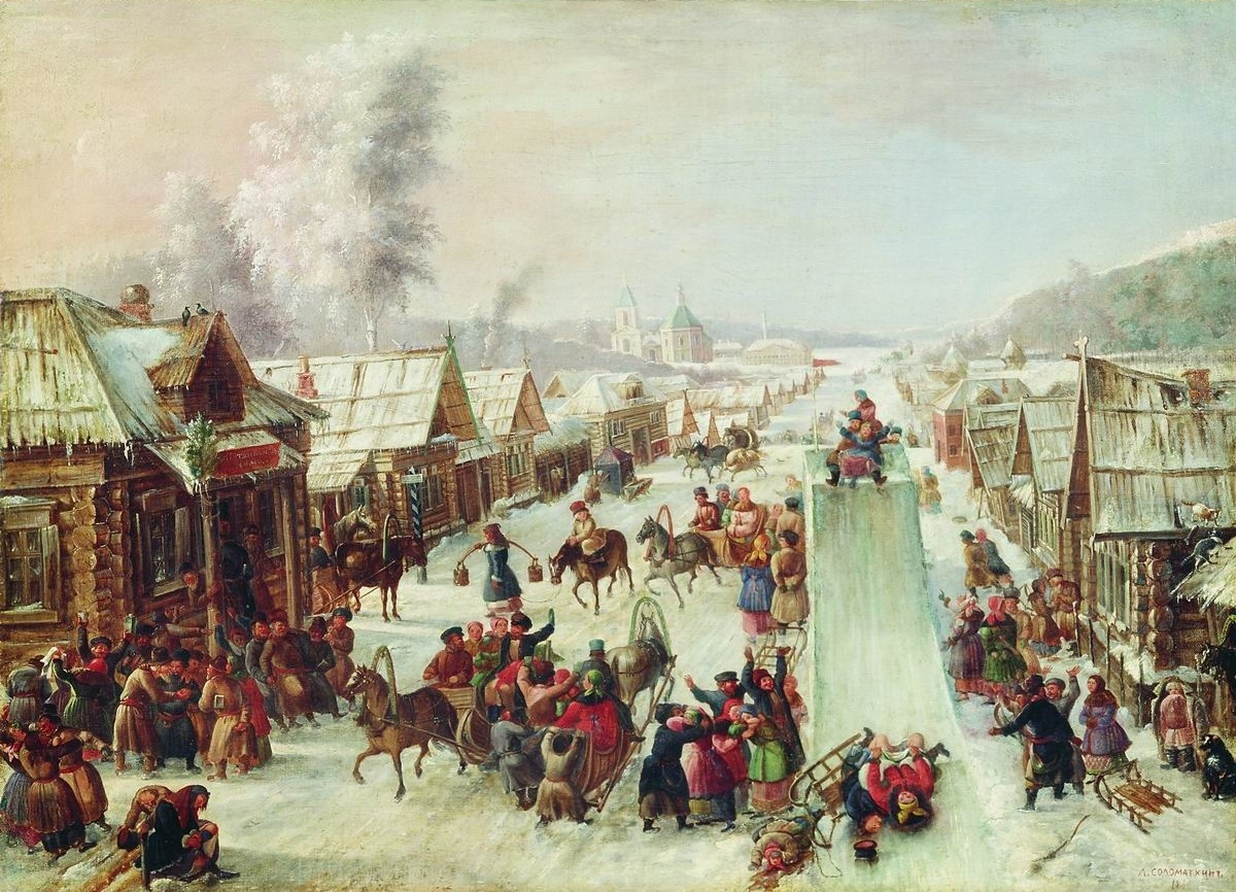
Leonid Solomatkin. Maslenitsa, 1878.

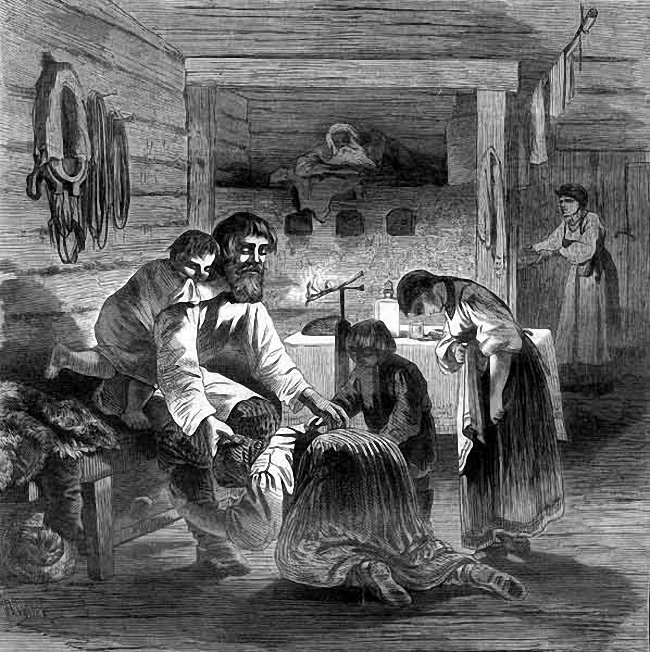
K. Kryzhanovsky. Sunday of Forgiveness, 19th century.

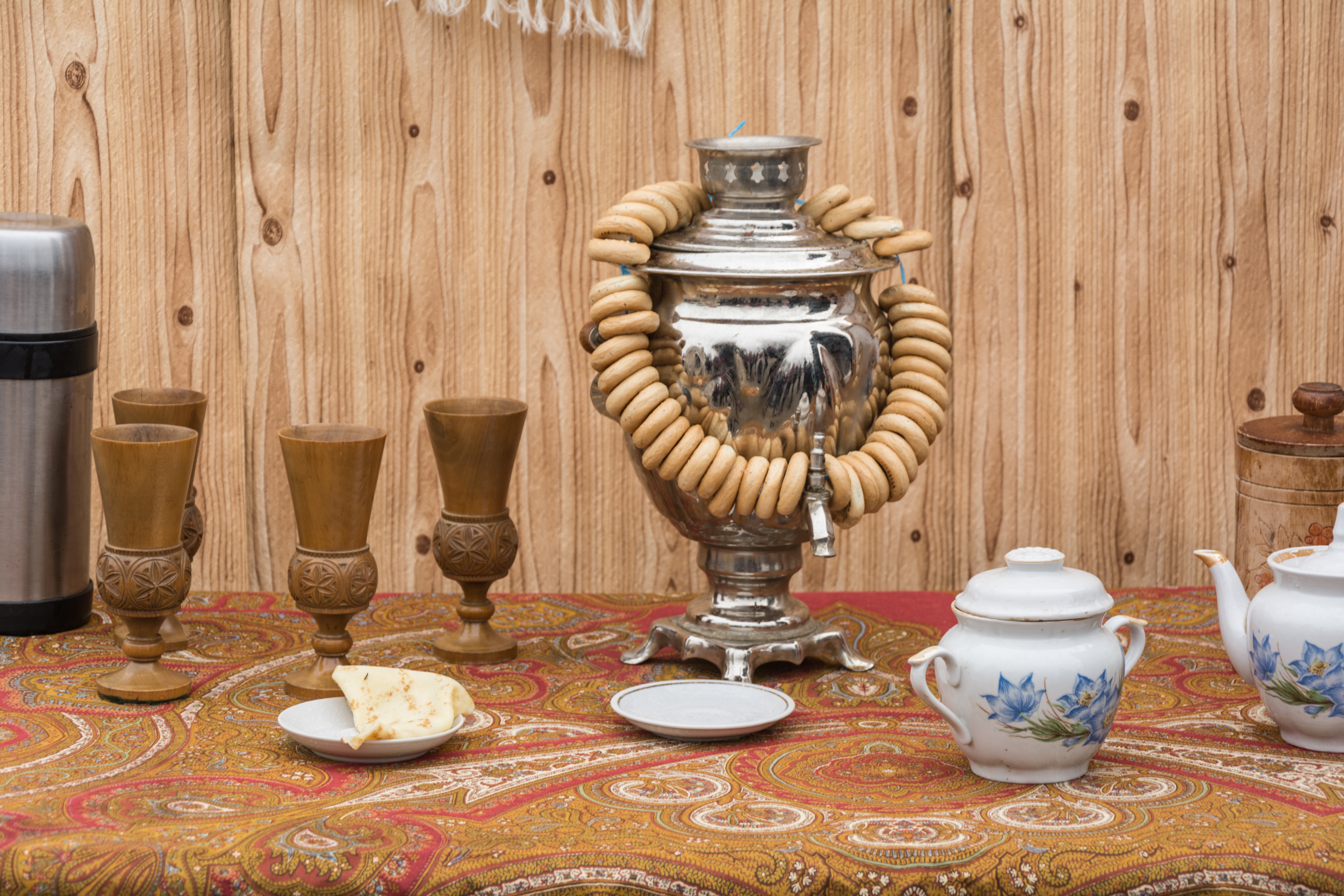
Scenery at Celebration of Maslenitsa

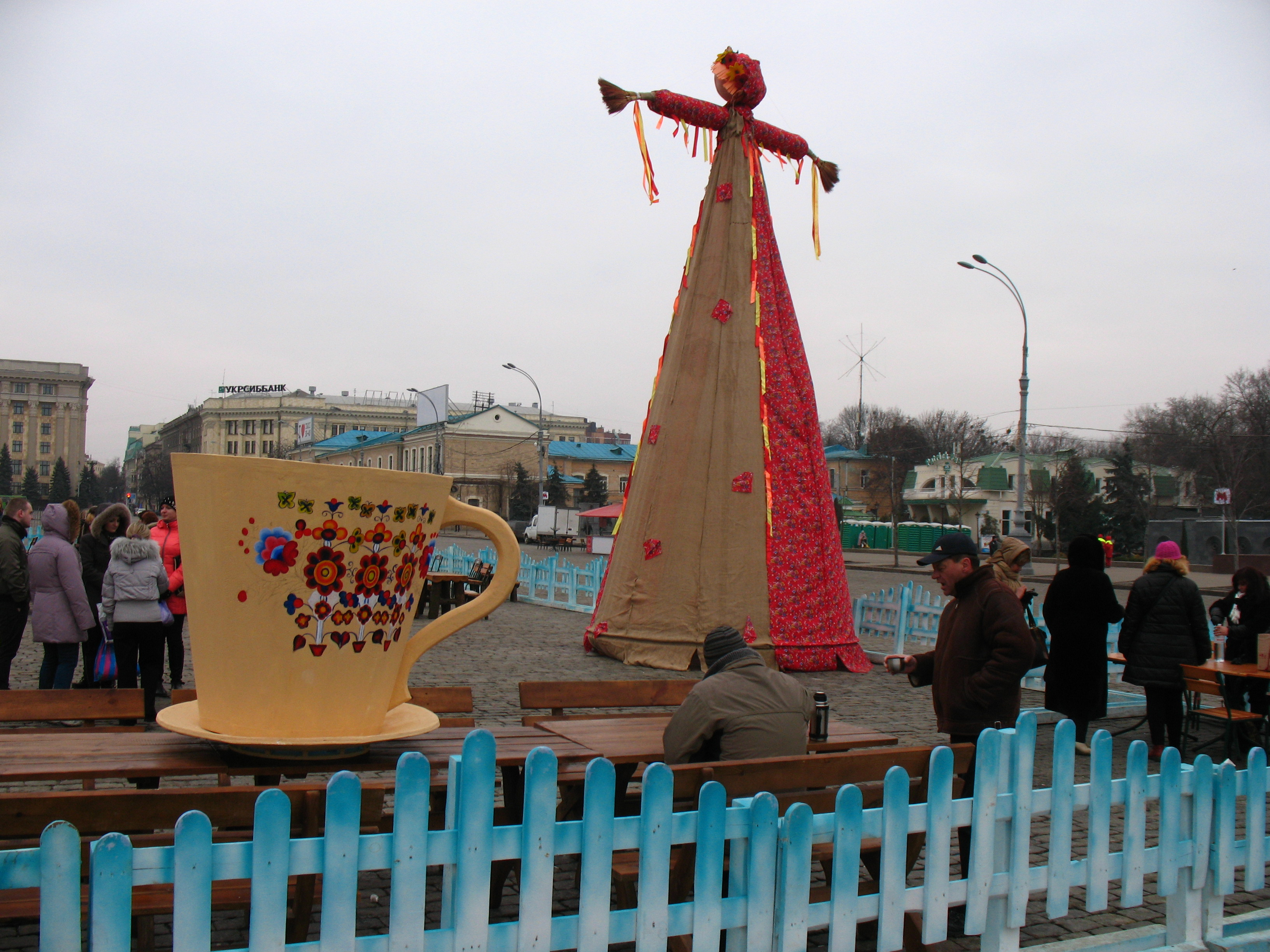
Maslenitsa celebrations in Kharkiv, 2014

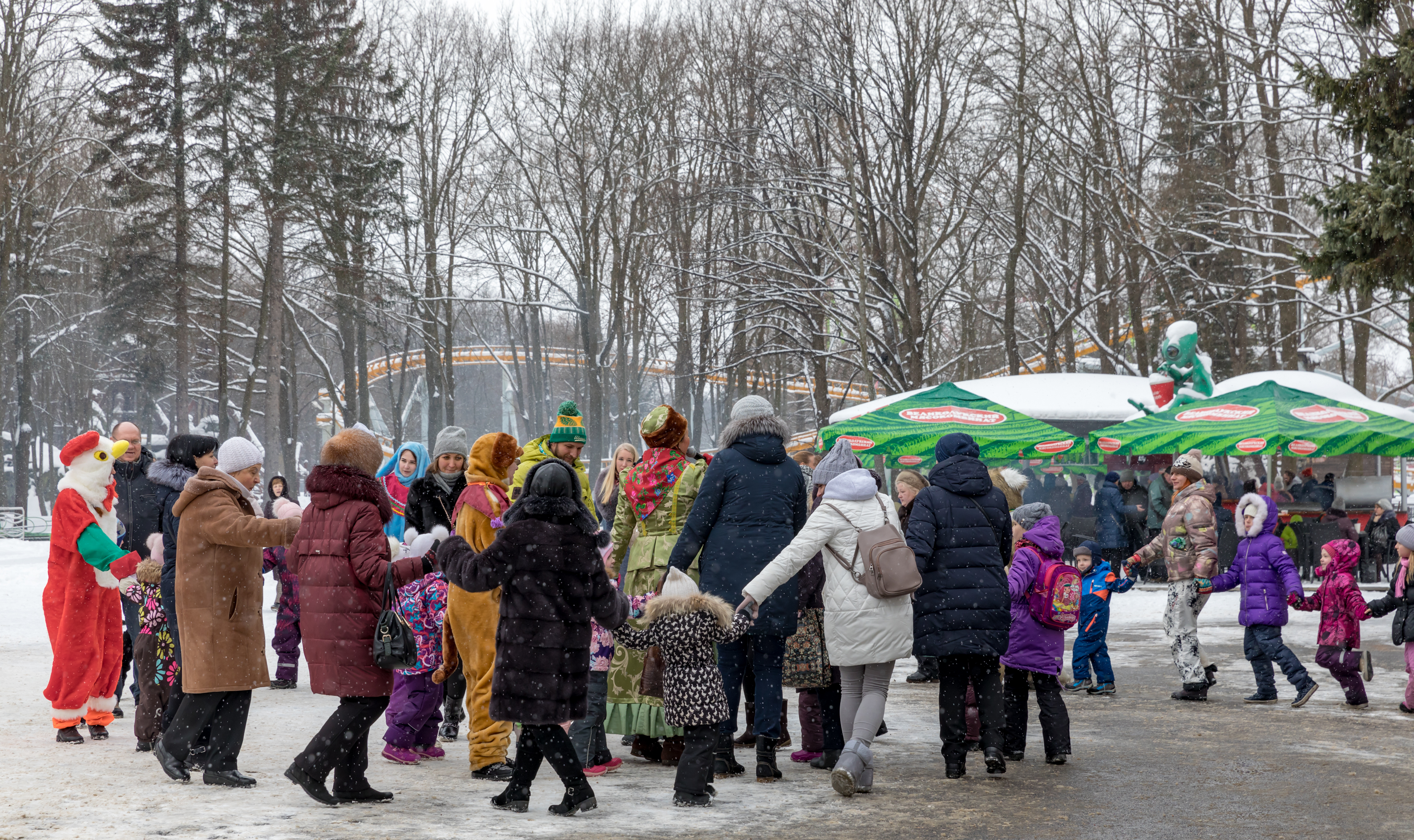
Maslenitsa festivities in St. Petersburg, 2018

== Adaptations ==
In 2012, Russian-Canadian composer Airat Ichmouratov composed an Overture Maslenitsa. It was premiered in Chicoutimi, Canada, on 24 February 2013 by L'Orchestre Symphonique du Saguenay–Lac-Saint-Jean under the baton of French-Canadian conductor Jacques Clément.

== See also ==
- Candlemas
- Slavic carnival
- Fašiangy (in Slovakia)
- Rio Carnival (in Brazil)
- Carnaval (in the Netherlands)
- Fat Thursday (in Poland)
- Mardi Gras (in other countries)
- Mărţişor (in Romania and Moldova)
- Marzanna (in Poland)
- Meteņi (in Latvia)
- Patras Carnival (in Greece)
- Tsiknopempti
- Shrove Tuesday or "Pancake Day" (in the United Kingdom and Ireland)
- Petrushka (ballet)
- Užgavėnės (in Lithuania)
- Farsang (Hungarian carnival)
- Shrovetide
