= Fat Thursday =

Christian tradition before Lent

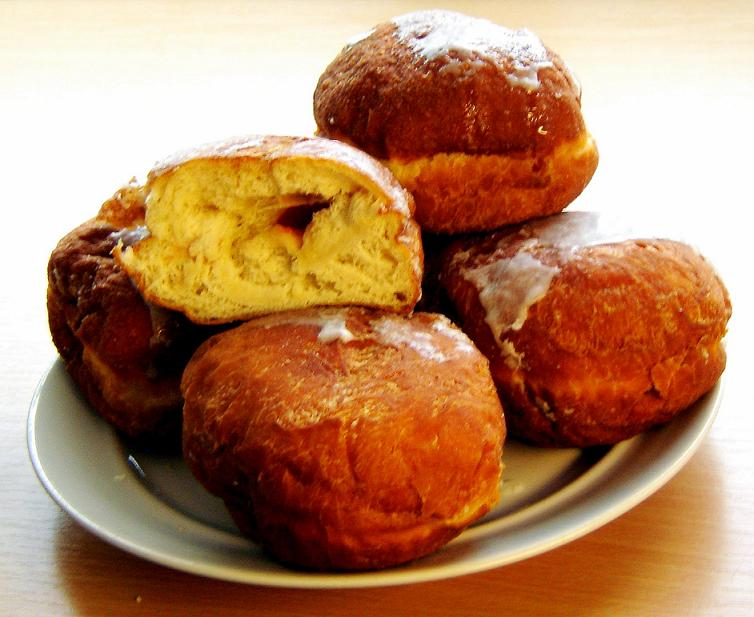
- Plate of Polish pączki
- Type: Christian, cultural
- Significance: Celebration period before fasting season of Lent
- Celebrations: Feasting
- Date: 5 days before Shrove Tuesday and Mardi Gras, 6 days before Ash Wednesday, 52 days before Easter
- 2025 date: February 27
- 2026 date: February 12
- 2027 date: February 4
- 2028 date: February 24
- Frequency: Annual
- Related to: Carnival, Fat Tuesday

Fat Thursday is a Christian tradition in some countries marking the last Thursday before Lent and is associated with the celebration of Carnival. Because Lent is a time of fasting, the days leading up to Ash Wednesday provide the last opportunity for feasting (including simply eating forbidden items) until Easter. Traditionally it is a day dedicated to eating, when people meet in their homes or cafés with their friends and relatives and eat large quantities of sweets, cakes and other meals usually not eaten during Lent. Among the most popular all-national dishes served on that day are pączki in Poland, fist-sized donuts filled with rose hip jam, and angel wings (faworki), puff pastry fingers served with powdered sugar.

== By country ==
=== Germany ===
Weiberfastnacht is an unofficial holiday in the Rhineland. At the majority of workplaces, work ends before noon. Celebrations start at 11:11 am in Germany. In comparison with Rosenmontag, there are hardly any parades, but people wear costumes and celebrate in pubs and in the streets. Beueler Weiberfastnacht ("women's carnival in Beuel") is traditionally celebrated in the Bonn district of Beuel. The tradition is said to have started here in 1824, when local women first formed their own "carnival committee". The symbolic storming of the Beuel town hall is broadcast live on TV. In many towns across the state of North Rhine Westphalia, a ritual "takeover" of the town halls by local women has become tradition. Among other established customs, on that day women cut off the ties of men, which are seen as a symbol of men's status. The men wear the stumps of their ties and get a Bützchen (little kiss) as compensation.

=== Greece ===
Known as Tsiknopempti in Greece, it is part of the traditional celebrations of Apókries (Απόκριες), the Greek Carnival season. The celebration, normally translated as Smelly Thursday, Charred Thursday, or Smoky Thursday, centers on the consumption of large amounts of grilled and roasted meats.

=== Italy ===
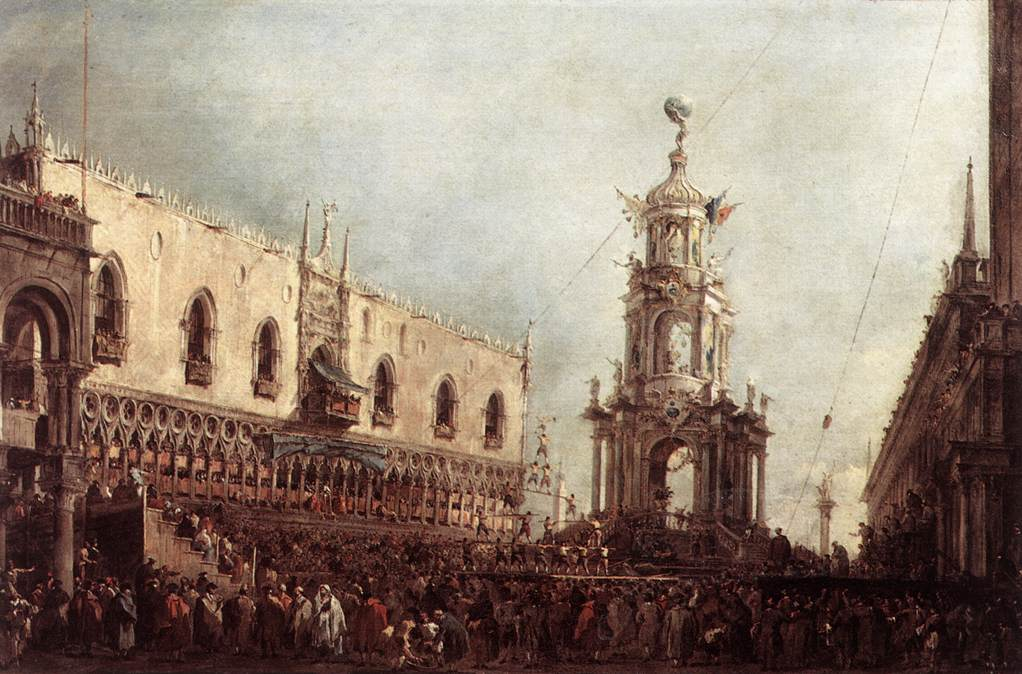
Carnival Thursday on the Piazzetta, Francesco Guardi, 1766–1770

Giovedì grasso (Fat Thursday) is celebrated in Italy, but it is not very different from martedì grasso (Shrove Tuesday). In Venice at the turn of the twentieth century, for example, it was marked by "masquerades, a battle of flowers on the Plaza, a general illumination and the opening of the lottery". The English writer Marie Corelli mentioned giovedì grasso (as "Giovedi Grasso") in her second novel, Vendetta (1886), as a day when "the fooling and the mumming, the dancing, shrieking, and screaming would be at its height."

=== Netherlands ===
In Cologne, since 1824, the so-called Weiberfastnacht is known. On the Thursday before carnaval, women wear men's clothes, reversing the roles and thus literally "being the man". In the Dutch border village Groenstraat a precursor to the Auwwieverbal (Old women ball) or Auw Wieverdaag (old women day) was known already in the early 19th century. The people at that time earned a living by breeding goats and selling women's hair. The Thursday before carnaval, men would sell the hair to their French buyers. After the sale, as the man had plenty of money, they would go visit the pubs. Out of fear that their men would squander the money raised by their hair, the women would find their husbands to prevent them from wasting it on alcohol. The search along the pubs transformed later to the Ouwewijvenbal. The women, this time incognito, firmly asserted themselves to their husbands and other men.

=== Poland ===
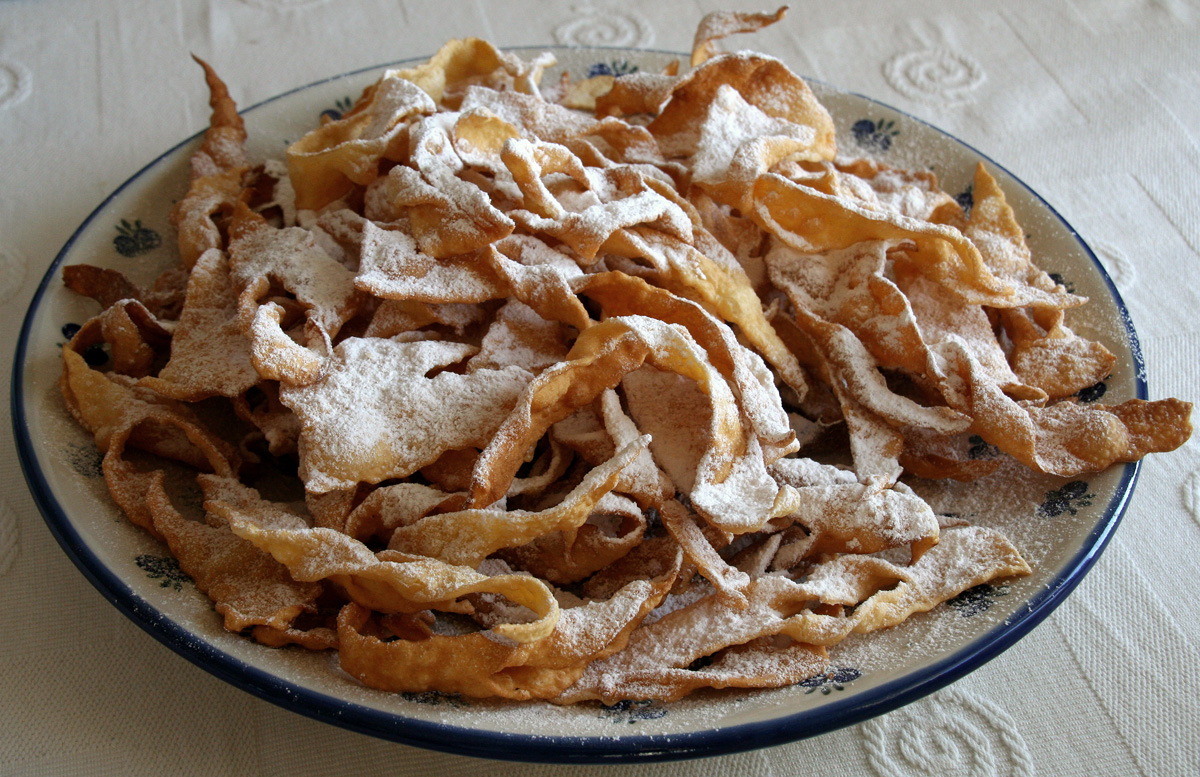
A plate of angel wings

In Poland, Fat Thursday is called tłusty czwartek. People purchase their favorite pastries from their local bakeries. Traditional foods include pączki (doughnuts), which are large deep-fried yeast pastries, traditionally filled with fruit jam or rose petal jam (though others are often used) and topped with powdered sugar, icing or glaze. Angel wings (faworki or chrusty) are also commonly consumed on this day.

=== Slovenia ===
In Slovenia, Fat Thursday is celebrated with specific culinary traditions. People often enjoy special foods that are rich and hearty. A common treat is “krof,” a type of doughnut that is usually filled with jam, particularly apricot, and dusted with powdered sugar. These doughnuts are a staple of the celebration and are enjoyed by many.

Apart from krof, other fatty and rich foods are also consumed, reflecting the tradition’s focus on indulgence and enjoyment before the austerity of Lent. The celebration is not just about food; it’s also a time for social gatherings, family get-togethers, and community events, often accompanied by music and festivities.

=== Spain ===
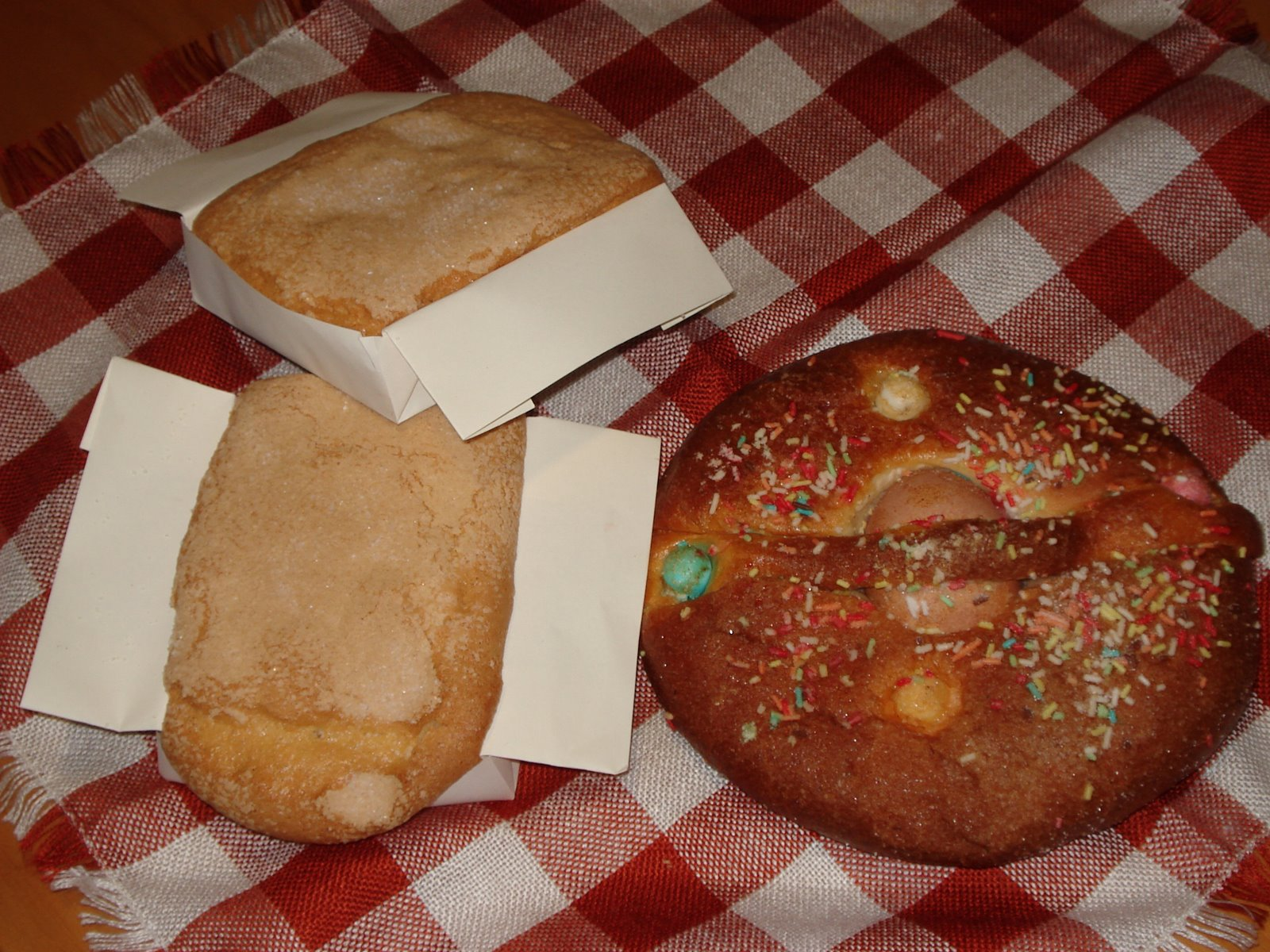
"Bizcochos" and "mona" on Fat Thursday in Albacete, Spain

In Spain this celebration is called jueves lardero or jueves de comadre and in Catalan-speaking areas, dijous gras, a children's holiday. In Albacete in Spain community of Castille-La Mancha, jueves lardero or Dia de la Mona is celebrated with a round pastry with a boiled egg in the middle called mona. In Aragon a meal is prepared with a special sausage from Graus while in Catalonia the tradition is to eat sweet Bunyols and Botifarra d’ou.

=== Middle East ===
Lebanese and Syrian Catholics have celebrated the day as "Drunkard's Thursday" or "Khamis El Sakara" with the latter having dolmas, kibbe nayyeh and drinking arak as the traditional food.

== See also ==
- Mardi Gras
- Maslenitsa (a similar holiday in Russia)
- Shrove Tuesday
- Tsiknopempti
