= Three Hours' Agony =

Christian devotion on Good Friday

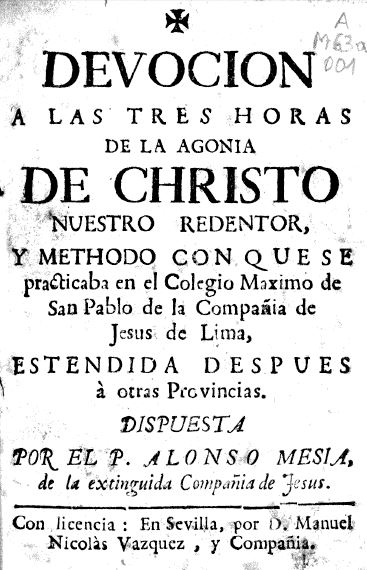
Front page of the Devocion a las tres horas by P. Alonso Messia SJ.

The Three Hours' Agony (also known as the Tre Ore, The Great Three Hours, or Three Hours' Devotion) is a Christian service held in Roman Catholic, Lutheran, Anglican and Methodist churches on Good Friday from noon till 3 p.m. to commemorate the three hours of Christ's hanging at the cross.

The Jesuit priest Alphonsus Messia (died 1732) is said to have devised this devotion in Lima, Peru. It was introduced to Rome around 1788 and spread around the world to many Christian denominations. In 1815, Pope Pius VII decreed a plenary indulgence to those who practise this devotion on Good Friday.
