= Good Friday =

Christian holiday

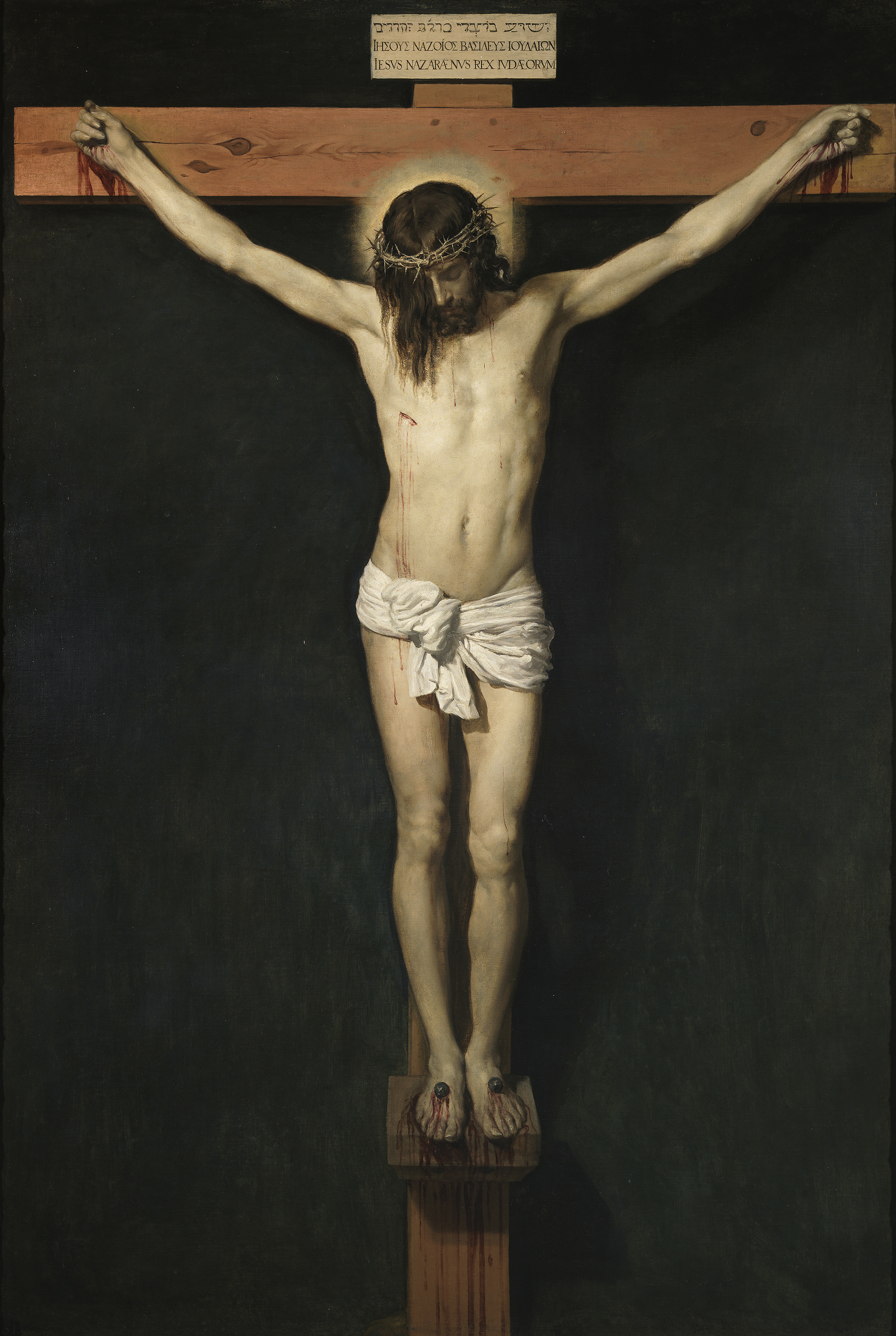
- Christ Crucified by Diego Velázquez, 1632
- Observed by: Christians
- Type: Christian
- Significance: Commemoration of the Passion, crucifixion and the death of Jesus Christ
- Observances: Worship services, prayer and vigil services, fasting, almsgiving
- Date: The Friday immediately preceding Easter Sunday
- 2025 date: April 18 (Western); April 18 (Eastern)
- 2026 date: April 3 (Western); April 10 (Eastern)
- 2027 date: March 26 (Western); April 30 (Eastern)
- 2028 date: April 14 (Western); April 14 (Eastern)
- Related to: Passover, Christmas (which celebrates the birth of Jesus), Septuagesima, Quinquagesima, Shrove Tuesday, Ash Wednesday, Lent, Palm Sunday, Holy Wednesday, Maundy Thursday, and Holy Saturday which lead up to Easter, Easter Sunday (primarily), Divine Mercy Sunday, Ascension, Pentecost, Whit Monday, Trinity Sunday, Corpus Christi and Feast of the Sacred Heart which follow it. It is related to the Feast of the Exaltation of the Holy Cross, which focuses on the benefits, graces, and merits of the Cross, rather than Jesus Christ's death.

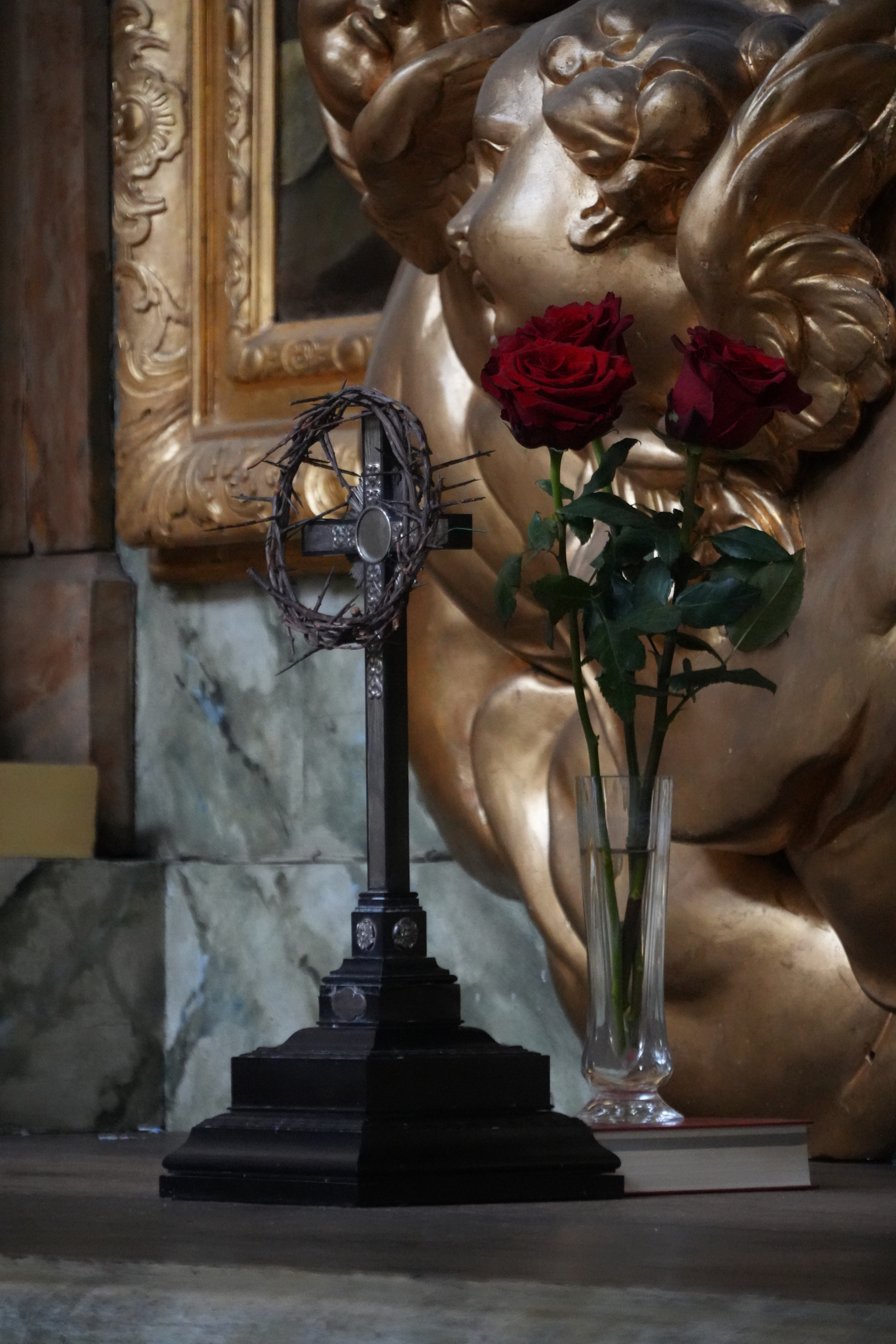
The altar cross of Hedvig Eleonora Evangelical-Lutheran Church on Good Friday in Östermalm, Sweden

Good Friday, also known as Holy Friday, Great Friday, Great and Holy Friday, or Friday of the Passion of the Lord, is a solemn Christian holy day commemorating the crucifixion of Jesus and his death at Calvary (Golgotha), part of the Passion of Jesus. It is observed during Holy Week as part of the Paschal Triduum.

Members of many Christian denominations, including the Catholic, Eastern Orthodox, Lutheran, Anglican, Methodist, Oriental Orthodox, United Protestant, and some Reformed traditions (including certain Continental Reformed, Presbyterian, and Congregationalist churches), observe Good Friday with fasting and church services. In many Catholic, Lutheran, Anglican, and Methodist churches, the Service of the Great Three Hours' Agony is held from noon until 3 p.m.— the hours the Bible records darkness covering the land until Jesus' death on the cross. In the Catholic, Lutheran, and Anglican traditions, the Stations of the Cross are prayed in the evening of Good Friday, as with other Fridays of Lent. Members of the Moravian Church have a Good Friday tradition of cleaning gravestones in Moravian cemeteries.

The date of Good Friday varies from one year to the next in both the Gregorian and Julian calendars. Eastern and Western Christianity disagree over the computation of the date of Easter and therefore of Good Friday. Good Friday is a widely instituted legal holiday around the world. Some predominantly Christian countries, such as Germany, have laws prohibiting certain acts—public dancing, horse racing—in remembrance of the somber nature of Good Friday.

== Etymology ==
The term Good Friday comes from the secondary meaning of the word good that is defined as 'pious, holy'. Less common examples of expressions based on this obsolete sense of good include 'the good book' for the Bible, 'good tide' for Christmas or Shrovetide, and Good Wednesday for the Wednesday in Holy Week. A common folk etymology explains the use of the word good in the current sense by the good that has come from Jesus's death on the cross according to Christian belief: "Christians believe that Jesus's death on the cross was the ultimate sacrifice for humanity's sins, saving mankind from death."

Another common folk etymology analyses Good Friday incorrectly as a corruption of the hypothetical, imagined term God Friday, similarly to the (linguistically correct) derivation of goodbye from a contraction of 'God be with ye'. In Old English, the day was called Long Friday (langa frigedæg [ˈlɑŋɡɑ ˈfriːjedæj])—referring to the lengthy observances of fasting and religious services, making it a day of extended devotion—and equivalents of this term are still used in Scandinavian languages and Finnish.

== Biblical accounts ==
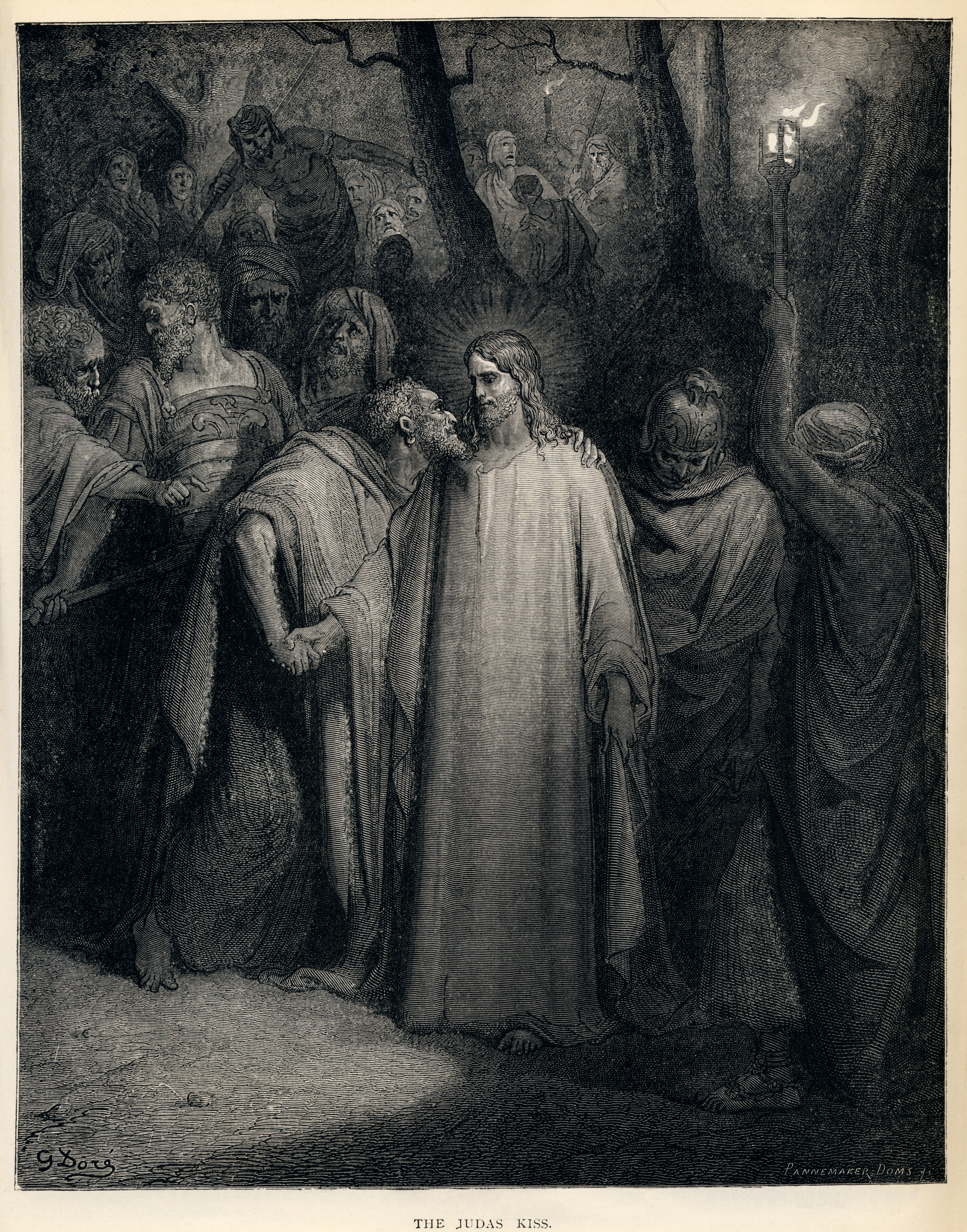
The Judas Kiss by Gustave Doré, 1866

According to the accounts in the Gospels, the royal soldiers, guided by Jesus' disciple Judas Iscariot, arrested Jesus in the Garden of Gethsemane. Judas received money (30 pieces of silver) for betraying Jesus and told the guards that whomever he kisses is the one they are to arrest. Following his arrest, Jesus was taken to the house of Annas, the father-in-law of the high priest, Caiaphas. There he was interrogated with little result and sent bound to Caiaphas the high priest where the Sanhedrin had assembled.

Conflicting testimony against Jesus was brought forth by many witnesses, to which Jesus answered nothing. Finally the high priest adjured Jesus to respond under solemn oath, saying "I adjure you, by the Living God, to tell us, are you the Anointed One, the Son of God?" Jesus testified ambiguously, "You have said it, and in time you will see the Son of Man seated at the right hand of the Almighty, coming on the clouds of Heaven." The high priest condemned Jesus for blasphemy, and the Sanhedrin concurred with a sentence of death. Peter, waiting in the courtyard, also denied Jesus three times to bystanders while the interrogations were proceeding just as Jesus had foretold.

In the morning, the whole assembly brought Jesus to the Roman governor Pontius Pilate under charges of subverting the nation, opposing taxes to Caesar, and making himself a king. Pilate authorized the Jewish leaders to judge Jesus according to their own law and execute sentencing; however, the Jewish leaders replied that they were not allowed by the Romans to carry out a sentence of death.

Pilate questioned Jesus and told the assembly that there was no basis for sentencing. Upon learning that Jesus was from Galilee, Pilate referred the case to the ruler of Galilee, King Herod, who was in Jerusalem for the Passover Feast. Herod questioned Jesus but received no answer; Herod sent Jesus back to Pilate. Pilate told the assembly that neither he nor Herod found Jesus to be guilty; Pilate resolved to have Jesus whipped and released. Under the guidance of the chief priests, the crowd asked for Barabbas, who had been imprisoned for committing murder during an insurrection. Pilate asked what they would have him do with Jesus, and they demanded, "Crucify him." Pilate's wife had seen Jesus in a dream earlier that day, and she forewarned Pilate to "have nothing to do with this righteous man." Pilate had Jesus flogged and then brought him out to the crowd to release him. The chief priests informed Pilate of a new charge, demanding Jesus be sentenced to death "because he claimed to be God's son." This possibility filled Pilate with fear, and he brought Jesus back inside the palace and demanded to know from where he came.

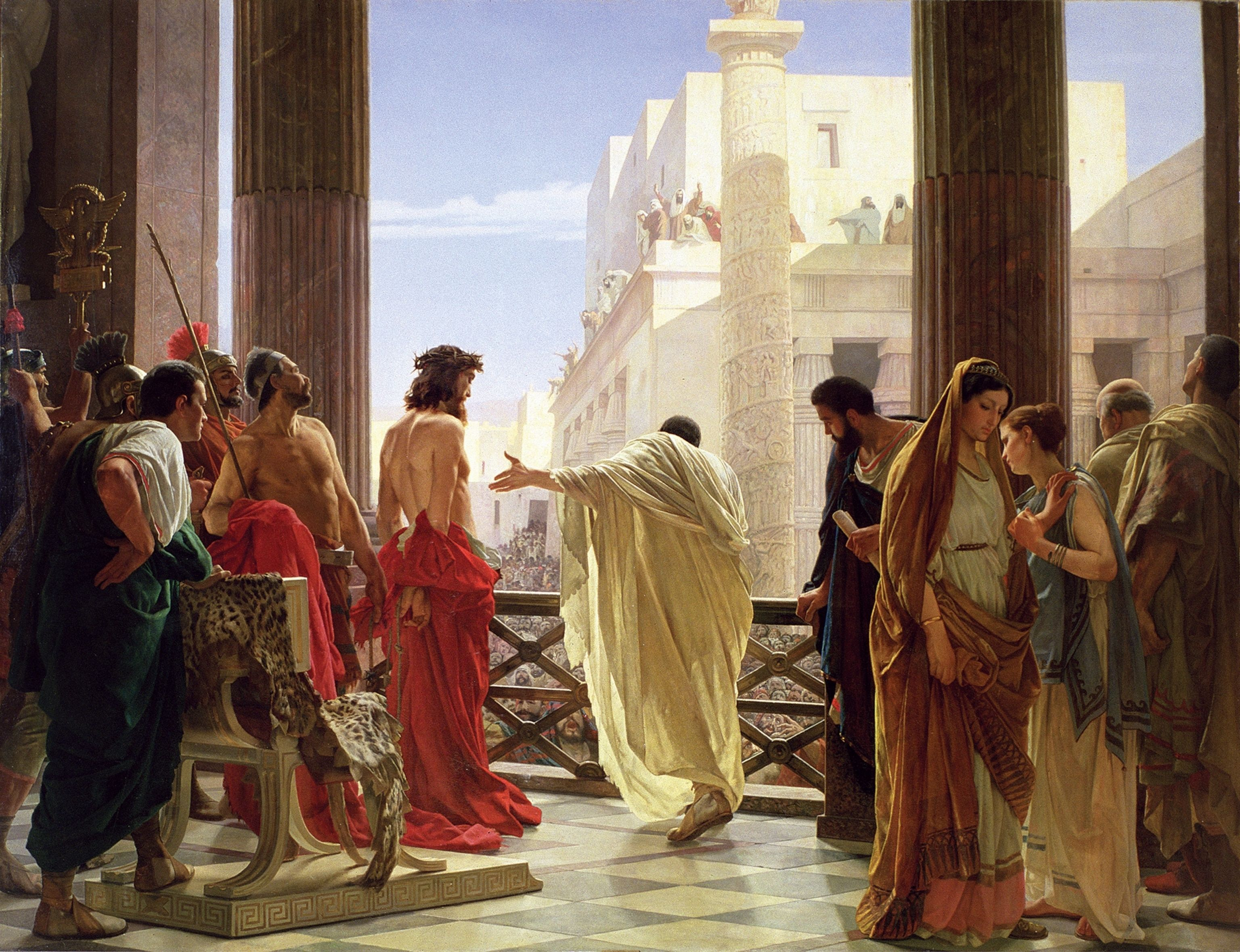
Antonio Ciseri's depiction of Ecce Homo with Jesus and Pontius Pilate, 19th century

Coming before the crowd one last time, Pilate declared Jesus innocent and washed his own hands in water to show he had no part in this condemnation. Nevertheless, Pilate handed Jesus over to be crucified in order to forestall a riot. The sentence written was "Jesus of Nazareth, King of the Jews." Jesus carried his cross to the site of execution (assisted by Simon of Cyrene), called the "place of the Skull", or "Golgotha" in Hebrew and in Latin "Calvary". There he was crucified along with two criminals.

Jesus agonized on the cross for three hours, from noon to 3 pm, darkness fell over the whole land. In the gospels of Mathew and Mark, Jesus is said to have spoken from the cross, quoting the messianic Psalm 22: "My God, my God, why have you forsaken me?"

With a loud cry, Jesus gave up his spirit. There was an earthquake, tombs broke open, and the curtain in the Temple was torn from top to bottom. The centurion on guard at the site of crucifixion declared, "Truly this was God's Son!"

Joseph of Arimathea, a member of the Sanhedrin and a secret follower of Jesus, who had not consented to his condemnation, went to Pilate to request the body of Jesus. Another secret follower of Jesus and member of the Sanhedrin named Nicodemus brought about a hundred-pound weight mixture of spices and helped wrap the body of Jesus. Pilate asked confirmation from the centurion of whether Jesus was dead. A soldier pierced the side of Jesus with a lance causing blood and water to flow out, and the centurion informed Pilate that Jesus was dead.

Joseph of Arimathea took Jesus' body, wrapped it in a clean linen shroud, and placed it in his own new tomb that had been carved in the rock in a garden near the site of the crucifixion. Nicodemus also brought 75 pounds of myrrh and aloes, and placed them in the linen with the body, in keeping with Jewish burial customs. They rolled a large rock over the entrance of the tomb. Then they returned home and rested, because Shabbat had begun at sunset.

== Eastern Orthodox ==
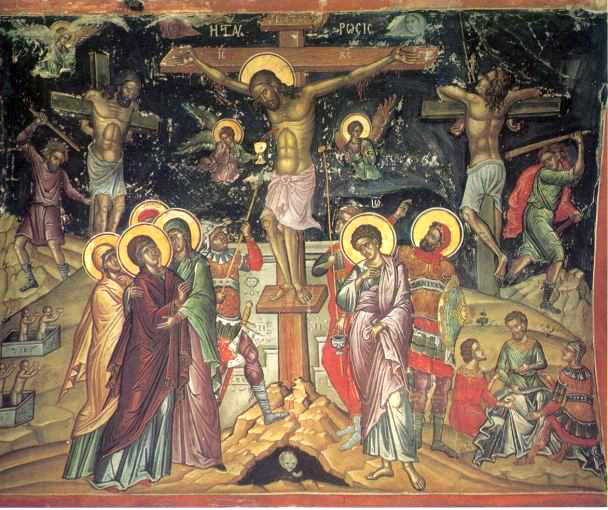
Icon of the Crucifixion, 16th century, by Theophanes the Cretan (Stavronikita Monastery, Mount Athos)

Byzantine Christians (Eastern Christians who follow the Rite of Constantinople: Orthodox Christians, Eastern Lutherans and Greek-Catholics) call this day "Great and Holy Friday", or simply "Great Friday". Because the sacrifice of Jesus through his crucifixion is recalled on this day, the Divine Liturgy (the sacrifice of bread and wine) is never celebrated on Great Friday, except when this day coincides with the Great Feast of the Annunciation, which falls on the fixed date of 25 March (for those churches which follow the traditional Julian Calendar, 25 March currently falls on 7 April of the modern Gregorian Calendar). Also on Great Friday, the clergy no longer wear the purple or red that is customary throughout Great Lent, but instead don black vestments. There is no "stripping of the altar" on Holy and Great Thursday as in the West; instead, all of the church hangings are changed to black, and will remain so until the Divine Liturgy on Great Saturday.

The faithful revisit the events of the day through the public reading of specific Psalms and the Gospels, and singing hymns about Christ's death. Rich visual imagery and symbolism, as well as stirring hymnody, are remarkable elements of these observances. In the Orthodox understanding, the events of Holy Week are not simply an annual commemoration of past events, but the faithful actually participate in the death and the resurrection of Jesus.

Great and Holy Friday is sometimes observed as an absolute fast, and adult Byzantine Christians are expected to abstain from all food and drink the entire day to the extent that their health permits. "On this Holy day neither a meal is offered nor do we eat on this day of the crucifixion. If someone is unable or has become very old [or is] unable to fast, he may be given bread and water after sunset. In this way we come to the holy commandment of the Holy Apostles not to eat on Great Friday." (cf. Black Fast)

=== Matins of Holy and Great Friday ===
The Byzantine Christian observance of Holy and Great Friday, which is formally known as The Order of Holy and Saving Passion of our Lord Jesus Christ, begins on Thursday night with the Matins of the Twelve Passion Gospels. Scattered throughout this Matins service are twelve readings from all four of the Gospels which recount the events of the Passion from the Last Supper through the Crucifixion and burial of Jesus. Some churches have a candelabrum with twelve candles on it, and after each Gospel reading one of the candles is extinguished.

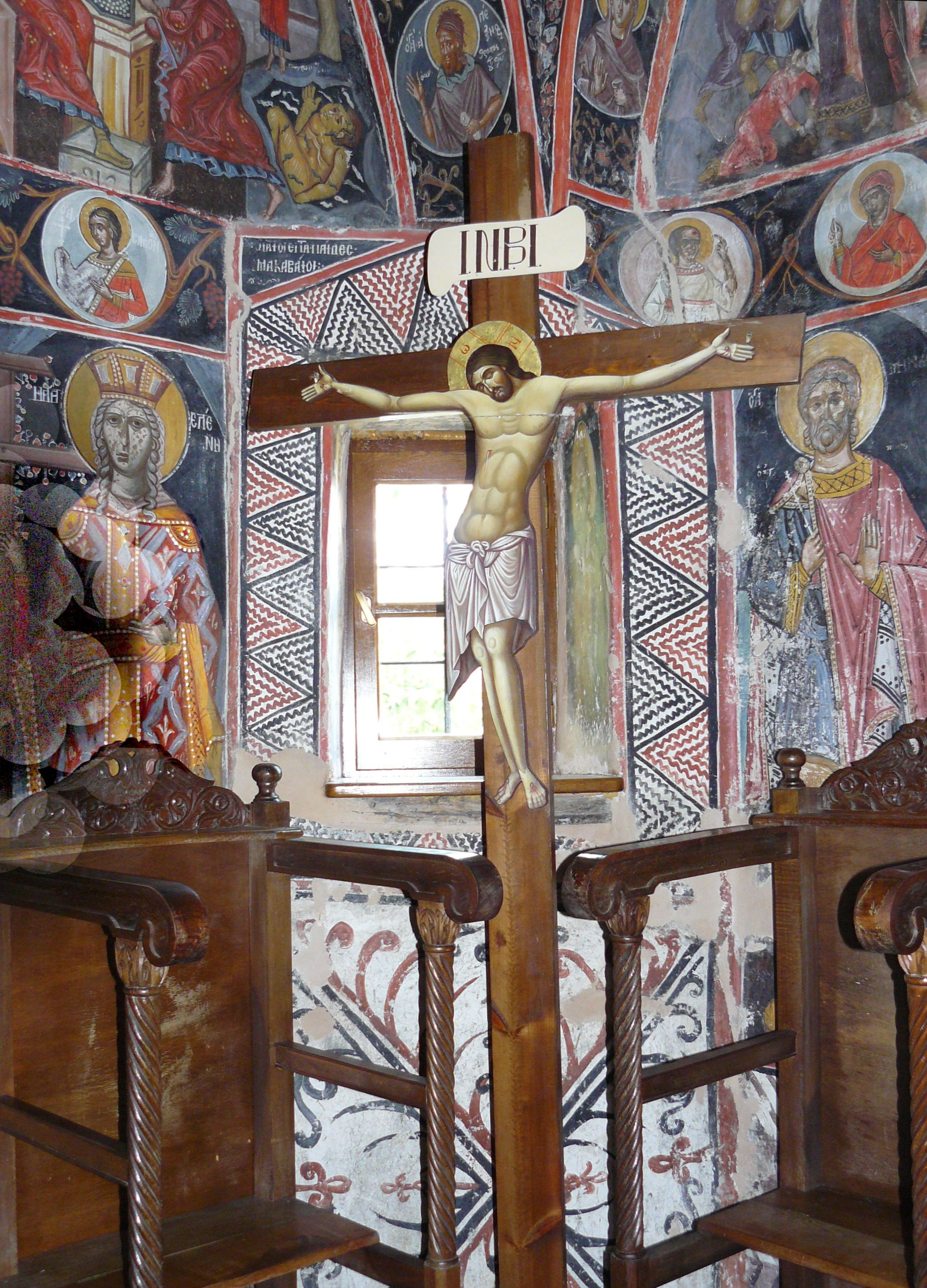
Good Friday cross from the Catholicon at Holy Trinity Monastery, Meteora, Greece

The first of these twelve readings is the longest Gospel reading of the liturgical year, and is a concatenation from all four Gospels. Just before the sixth Gospel reading, which recounts Jesus being nailed to the cross, a large cross is carried out of the sanctuary by the priest, accompanied by incense and candles, and is placed in the center of the nave (where the congregation gathers) to the accompaniment of the hymn Sēmeron kremātai epí xýlou:

Today He who hung the earth upon the waters is hung upon the Cross (three times).
He who is King of the angels is arrayed in a crown of thorns.
He who wraps the Heavens in clouds is wrapped in the purple of mockery.
He who in Jordan set Adam free receives blows upon His face.
The Bridegroom of the Church is transfixed with nails.
The Son of the Virgin is pierced with a spear.
We venerate Thy Passion, O Christ (three times).
Show us also Thy glorious Resurrection.

The readings are:

1. John 13:31–18:1 – Christ's last sermon, Jesus prays for the apostles
2. John 18:1–28 – The agony in the garden, the mockery and denial of Christ
3. Matthew 26:57–75 – The mockery of Christ, Peter denies Christ
4. John 18:28–19:16 – Pilate questions Jesus; Jesus is condemned; Jesus is mocked by the Romans.
5. Matthew 27:3–32 – Judas commits suicide; Jesus is condemned; Jesus mocked by the Romans; Simon of Cyrene compelled to carry the cross
6. Mark 15:16–32 – Jesus dies
7. Matthew 27:33–54 – Jesus dies
8. Luke 23:32–49 – Jesus dies
9. John 19:25–37 – Jesus dies
10. Mark 15:43–47 – Joseph of Arimathea buries Jesus
11. John 19:38–42 – Joseph of Arimathea buries Jesus
12. Matthew 27:62–66 – The Jews set a guard

During the service, all come forward to kiss the feet of Christ on the cross. After the Canon, a brief, moving hymn, The Wise Thief is chanted by singers who stand at the foot of the cross in the center of the nave. The service does not end with the First Hour, as usual, but with a special dismissal by the priest:

May Christ our true God, Who for the salvation of the world endured spitting, and scourging, and buffeting, and the Cross, and death, through the intercessions of His most pure Mother, of our holy and God-bearing fathers, and of all the saints, have mercy on us and save us, for He is good and the Lover of mankind.

=== Royal Hours ===
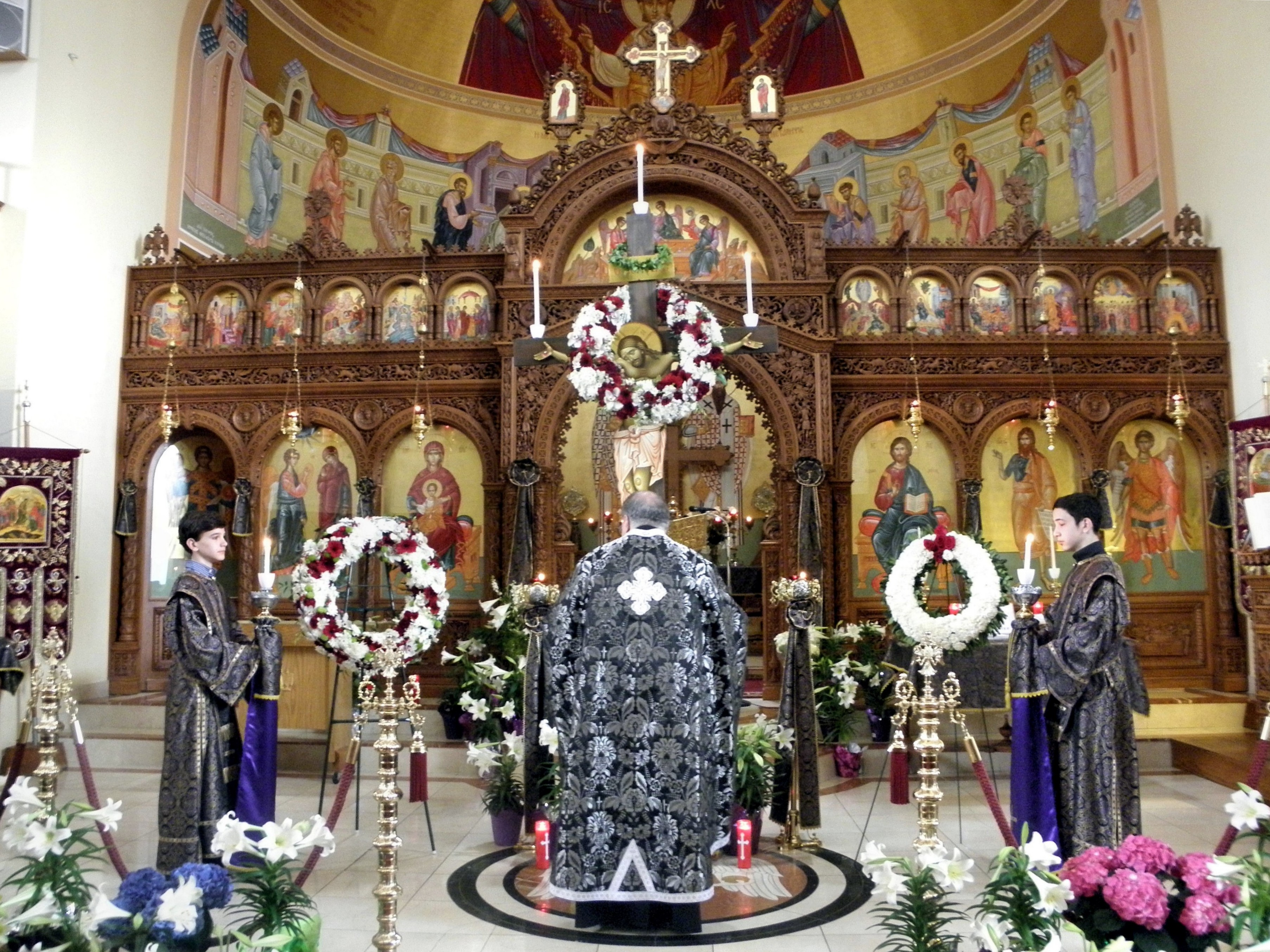
Vigil during the Service of the Royal Hours

The next day, in the forenoon on Friday, all gather again to pray the Royal Hours, a special expanded celebration of the Little Hours (including the First Hour, Third Hour, Sixth Hour, Ninth Hour and Typica) with the addition of scripture readings (Old Testament, Epistle and Gospel) and hymns about the Crucifixion at each of the Hours (some of the material from the previous night is repeated). This is somewhat more festive in character, and derives its name of "Royal" from both the fact that the Hours are served with more solemnity than normal, commemorating Christ the King who humbled himself for the salvation of mankind, and also from the fact that this service was in the past attended by the Emperor and his court.

=== Vespers of Holy and Great Friday ===
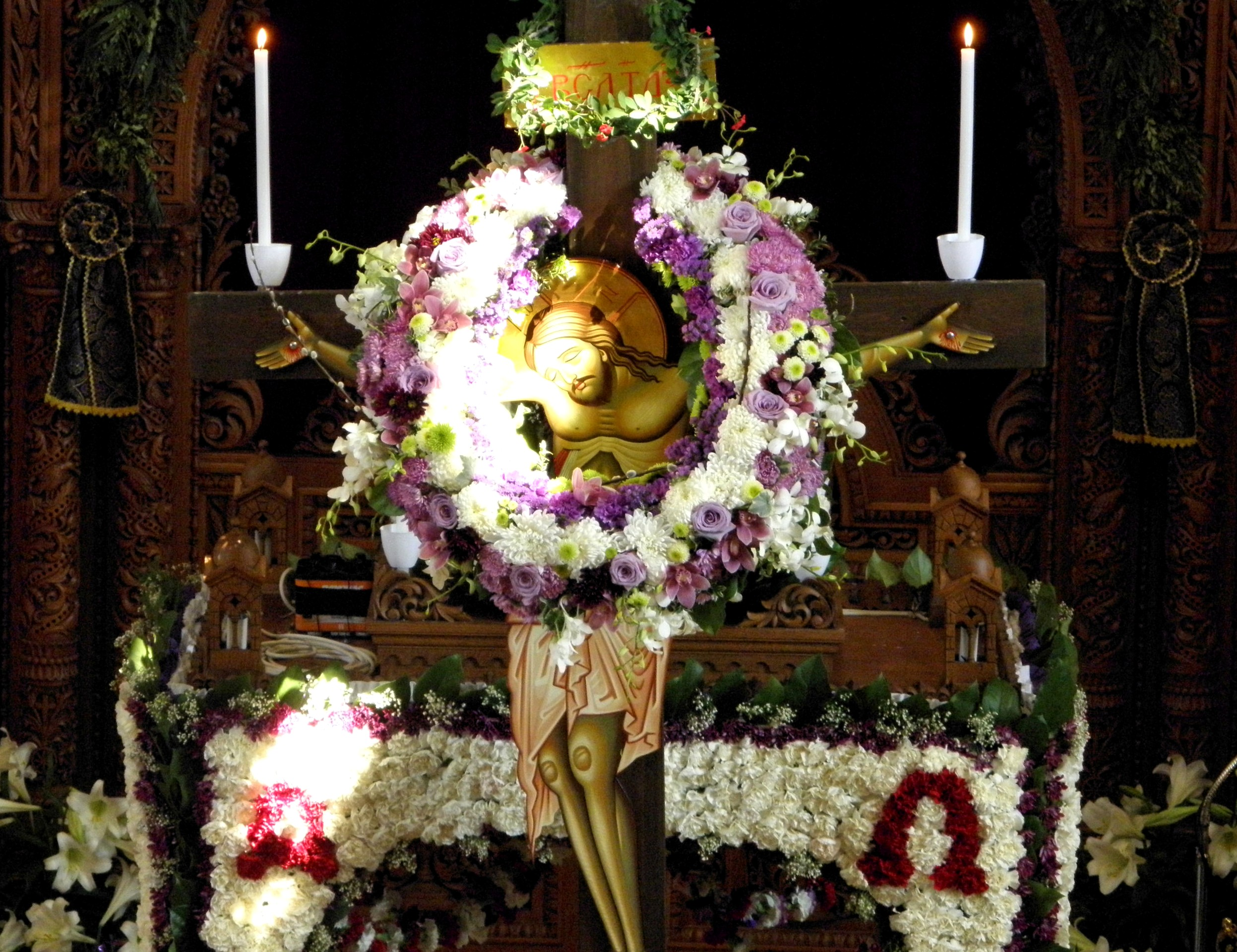
The crucified Christ, just before the Deposition from the Cross and the placing of the Epitaphios in the Sepulchre

In the afternoon, around 3 pm, all gather for the Vespers of the Taking-Down from the Cross, commemorating the Deposition from the Cross. Following Psalm 103 (104) and the Great Litany, 'Lord, I call' is sung without a Psalter reading. The first five stichera (the first being repeated) are taken from the Aposticha at Matins the night before, but the final 3 of the 5 are sung in Tone 2. Three more stichera in Tone 6 lead to the Entrance. The Evening Prokimenon is taken from Psalm 21 (22): 'They parted My garments among them, and cast lots upon My vesture.'

There are then four readings, with Prokimena before the second and fourth:

- Exodus 33:11–23 – God shows Moses His glory
- The second Prokimenon is from Psalm 34 (35): 'Judge them, O Lord, that wrong Me: fight against them that fight against Me.'
- Job 42:12–20 – God restores Job's wealth (note that verses 18–20 are found only in the Septuagint)
- Isaiah 52:13–54:1 – The fourth Suffering Servant song
- The third Prokimenon is from Psalm 87 (88): 'They laid me in the lowest pit: in dark places and in the shadow of death.'
- 1 Corinthians 1:18–2:2 – St. Paul places Christ crucified as the centre of the Christian life

An Alleluia is then sung, with verses from Psalm 68 (69): 'Save Me, O God: for the waters are come in, even unto my soul.'

The Gospel reading is a composite taken from three of the four the Gospels (Matthew 27:1–38; Luke 23:39–43; Matthew 27:39–54; John 19:31–37; Matthew 27:55–61), essentially the story of the crucifixion as it appears according to St. Matthew, interspersed with St. Luke's account of the confession of the Good Thief and St. John's account of blood and water flowing from Jesus' side. During the Gospel, the body of Christ (the soma) is removed from the cross, and, as the words in the Gospel reading mention Joseph of Arimathea, is wrapped in a linen shroud, and taken to the altar in the sanctuary.

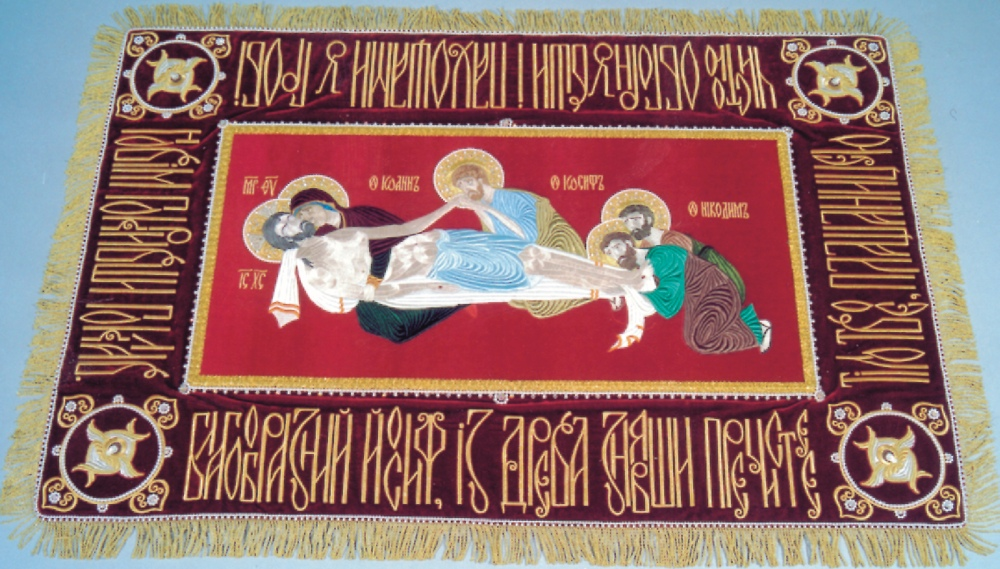
The epitaphios ("winding sheet"), depicting the preparation of the body of Jesus for burial

The Aposticha reflects on the burial of Christ. Either at this point (in the Greek use) or during the troparion following (in the Slav use):

Noble Joseph, taking down Thy most pure body from the Tree, wrapped it in pure linen and spices, and he laid it in a new tomb.

An epitaphios or "winding sheet" (a cloth embroidered with the image of Christ prepared for burial) is carried in procession to a low table in the nave which represents the Tomb of Christ; it is often decorated with an abundance of flowers. The epitaphios itself represents the body of Jesus wrapped in a burial shroud, and is a roughly full-size cloth icon of the body of Christ. The service ends with a hope of the Resurrection:

The Angel stood by the tomb, and to the women bearing spices he cried aloud: 'Myrrh is fitting for the dead, but Christ has shown Himself a stranger to corruption.

Then the priest may deliver a homily and everyone comes forward to venerate the epitaphios. In the Slavic practice, at the end of Vespers, Compline is immediately served, featuring a special Canon of the Crucifixion of our Lord and the Lamentation of the Most Holy Theotokos by Symeon the Logothete.

=== Matins of Holy and Great Saturday ===
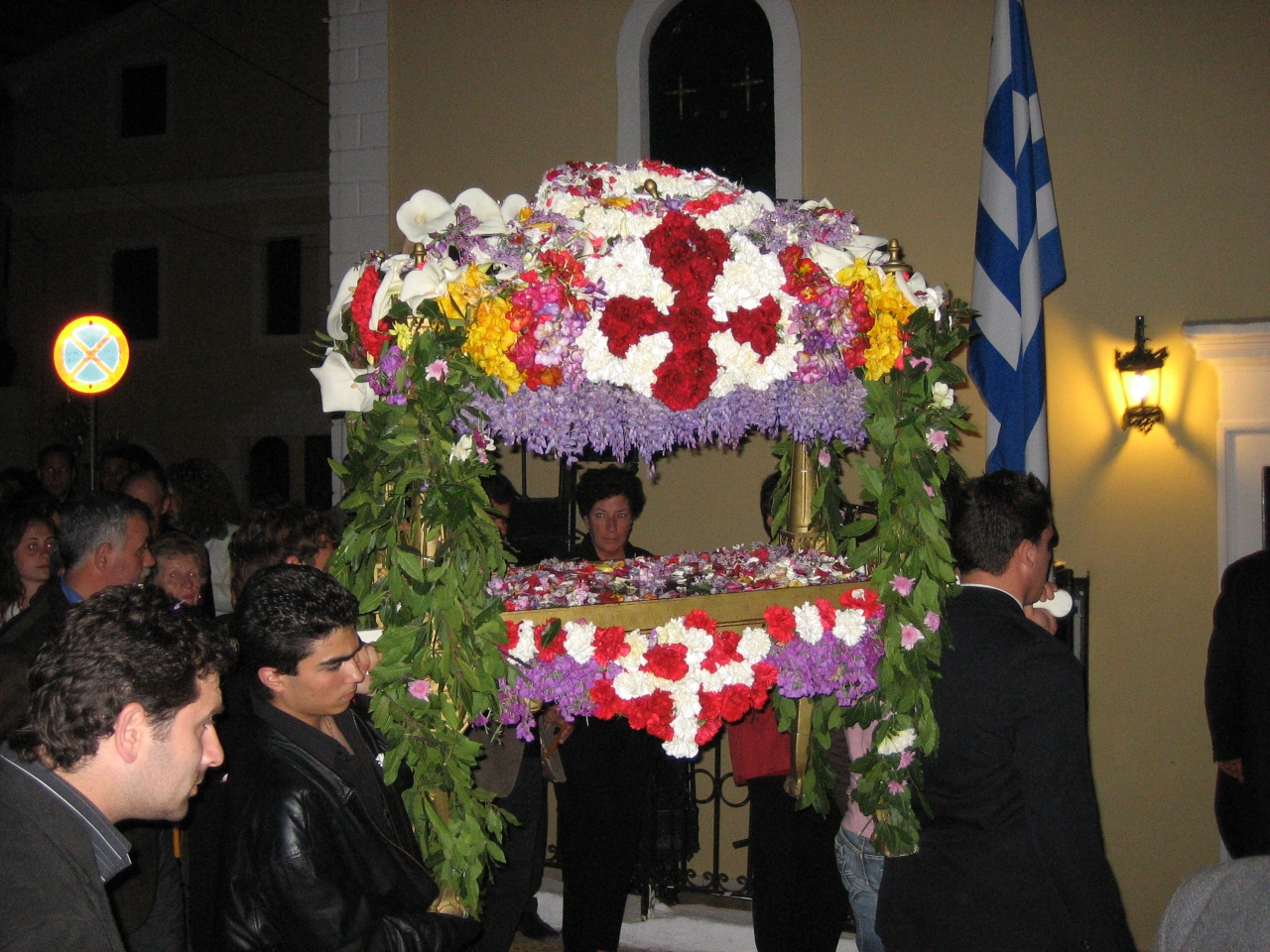
The Epitaphios being carried in procession in a church in Greece

On Friday night, the Matins of Holy and Great Saturday, a unique service known as The Lamentation at the Tomb (Epitáphios Thrēnos) is celebrated. This service is also sometimes called Jerusalem Matins. Much of the service takes place around the tomb of Christ in the center of the nave. In Greek communities all over the world, the Epitaphios procession is a ceremonial funeral procession for Christ that takes place in Greek Orthodox and Byzantine Catholic traditions on Good Friday, where a decorated kouvouklion is carried around local cities. The decorated kouvouklion symbolizes the casket or tomb of Jesus Christ, and when it is fully decorated with flowers, candles, and the special iconographic cloth depicting the dead body of Christ known as the epitaphios cloth, the entire object is referred to as the Epitaphios.

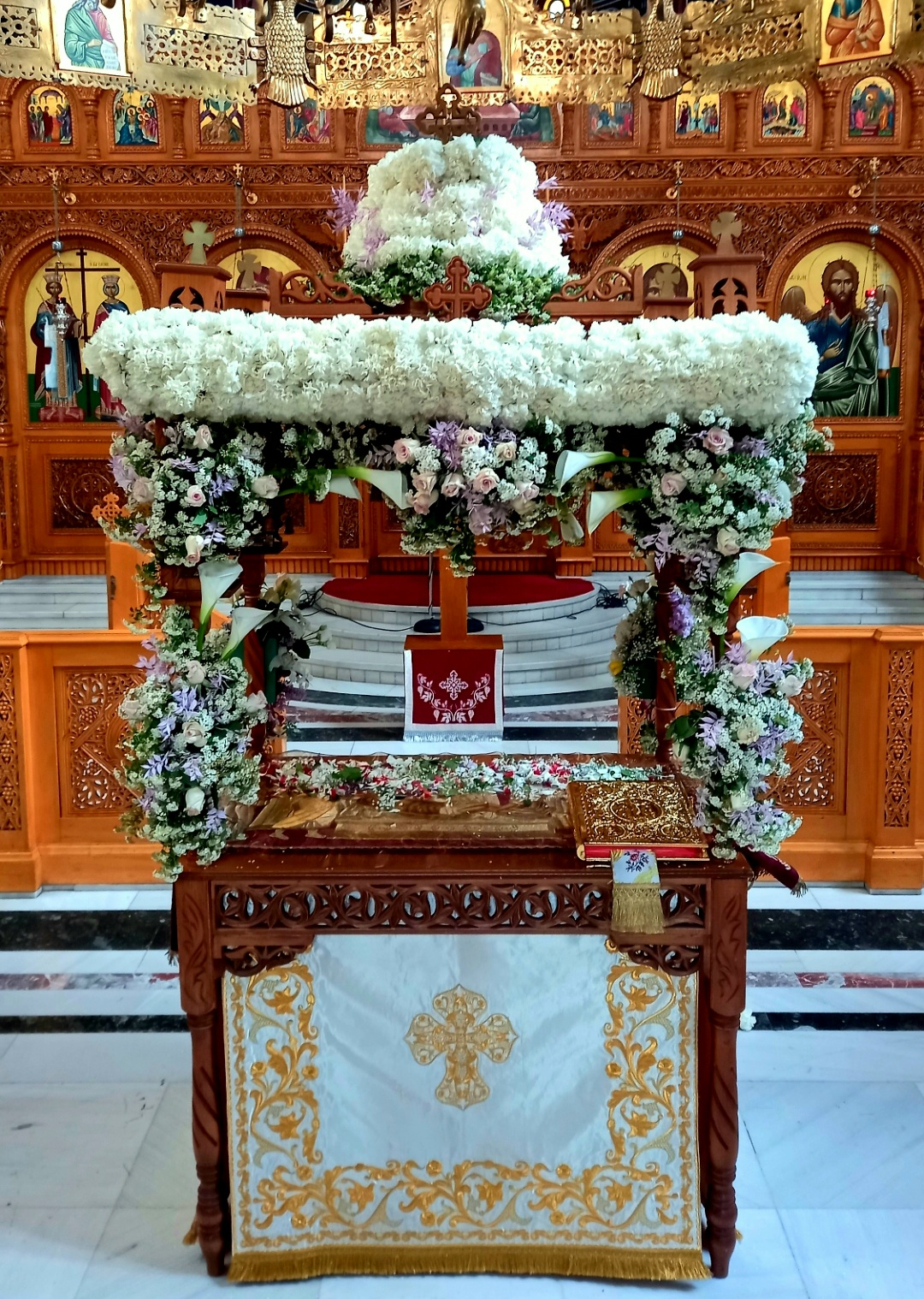
Epitaphios adorned for veneration, Church of Saints Constantine and Helen, Hippodromion Sq., Thessaloniki, Greece

A unique feature of the service is the chanting of the Lamentations or Praises (Enkōmia), which consist of verses chanted by the clergy interspersed between the verses of Psalm 118 (which is by far the longest psalm in the Bible). The Enkōmia are the best-loved hymns of Greek Byzantine hymnography, both their poetry and their music being uniquely suited to each other and to the spirit of the day.

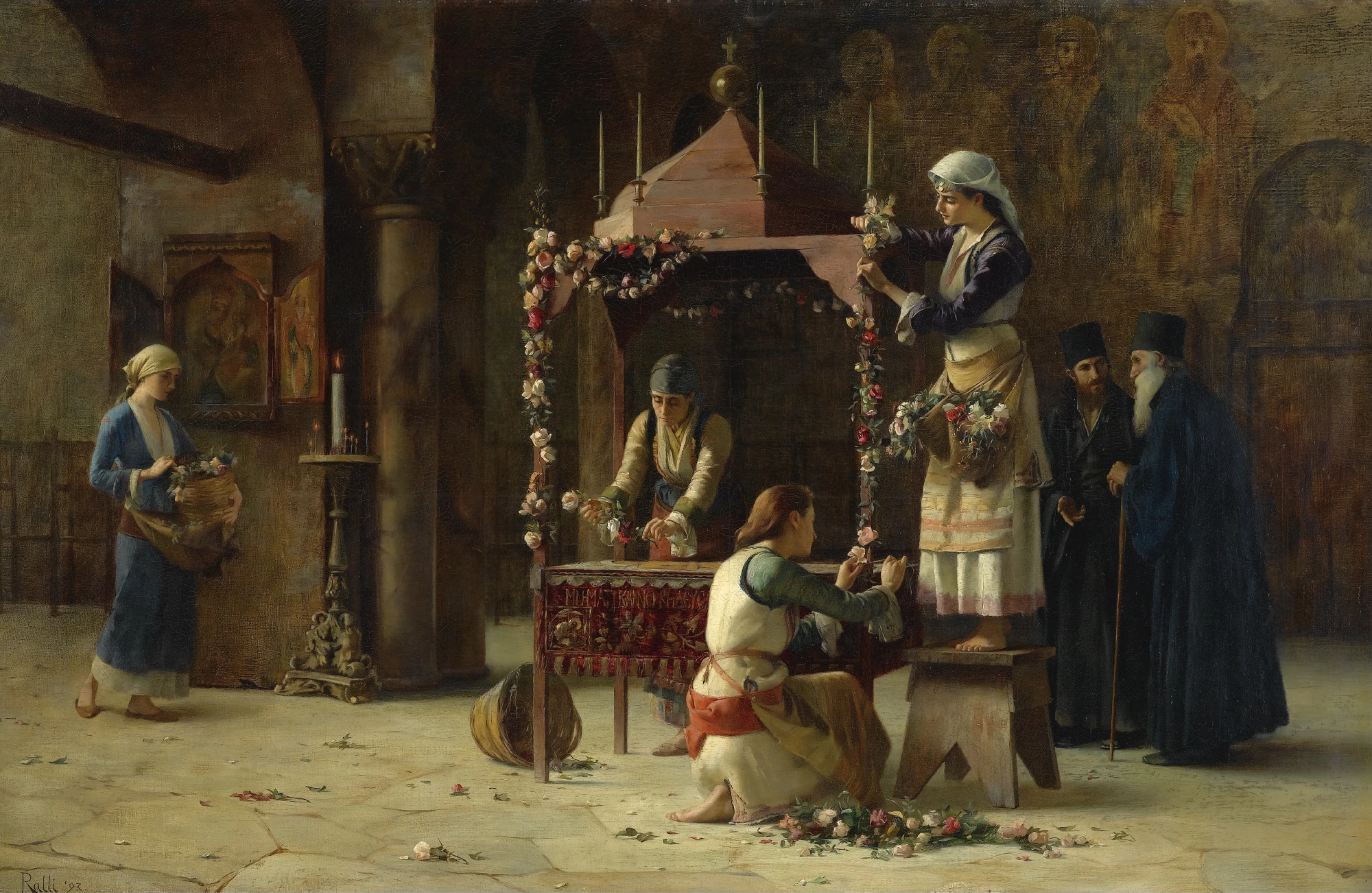
Holy Friday, Greece by Théodore Jacques Ralli c. 1893, Greek women decorating the kouvouklion with flowers featuring the iconographic cloth known as the Epitaphios

They consist of 185 tercet antiphons arranged in three parts (stáseis or "stops"), which are interjected with the verses of Psalm 118, and nine short doxastiká ("Gloriae") and Theotókia (invocations to the Virgin Mary). The three stáseis are each set to its own music, and are commonly known by their initial antiphons: Ἡ ζωὴ ἐν τάφῳ, "Life in a grave", Ἄξιον ἐστί, "Worthy it is", and Αἱ γενεαὶ πᾶσαι, "All the generations". Musically they can be classified as strophic, with 75, 62, and 48 tercet stanzas each, respectively.

The climax of the Enkōmia comes during the third stásis, with the antiphon "Ω γλυκύ μου ἔαρ", a lamentation of the Virgin for her dead Child ("O, my sweet spring, my sweetest child, where has your beauty gone?"). Later, during a different antiphon of that stasis ("Early in the morning the myrrh-bearers came to Thee and sprinkled myrrh upon Thy tomb"), young girls of the parish place flowers on the Epitaphios and the priest sprinkles it with rose-water. The author(s) and date of the Enkōmia are unknown. Their High Attic linguistic style suggests a dating around the 6th century, possibly before the time of St. Romanos the Melodist.

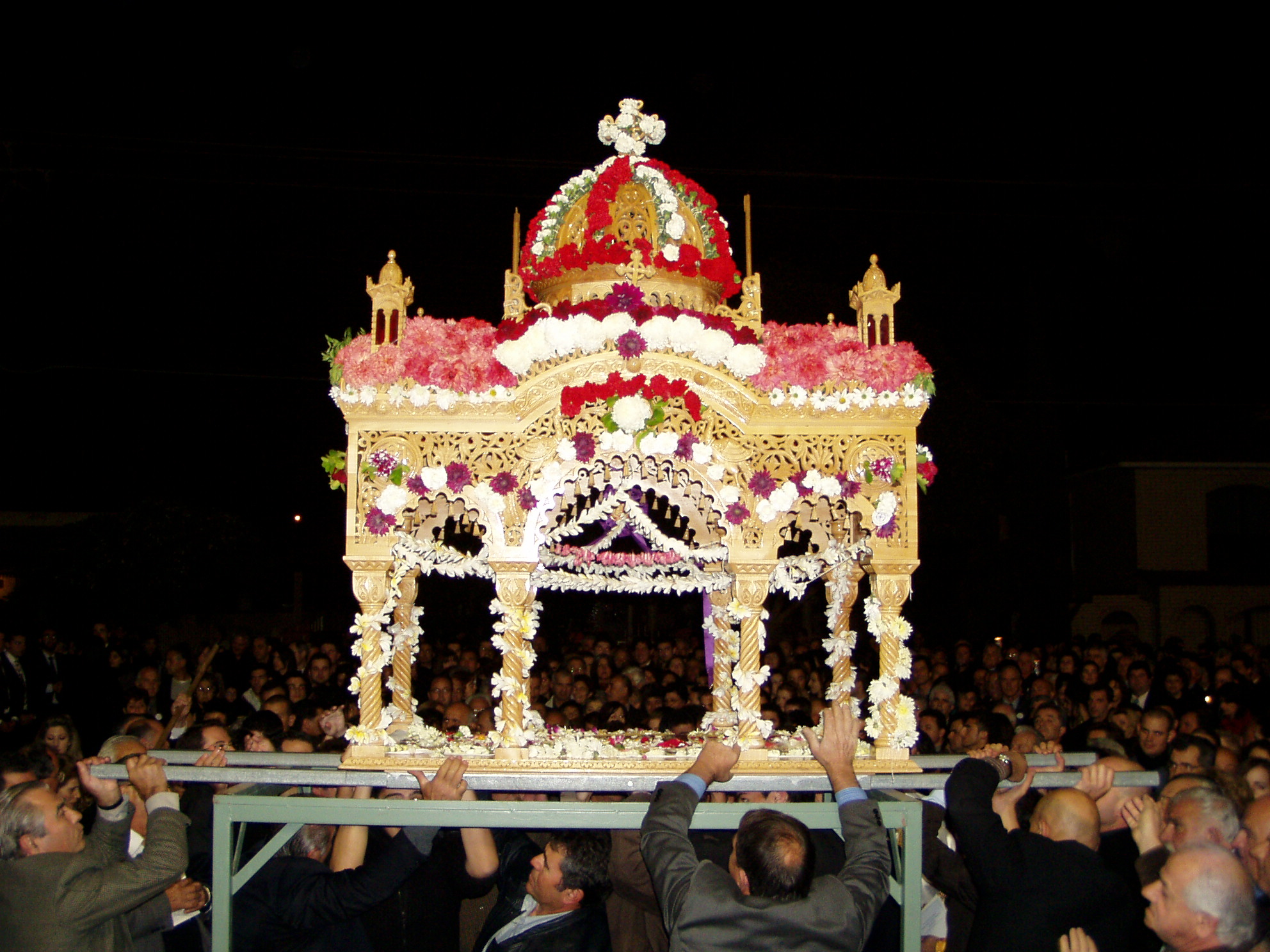
The Epitaphios mounted upon return of procession, at an Orthodox Church in Adelaide, Australia

The Evlogitaria (Benedictions) of the Resurrection are sung as on Sunday, since they refer to the conversation between the myrrh-bearers and the angel in the tomb, followed by kathismata about the burial of Christ. Psalm 50 (51) is then immediately read, and then followed by a much loved-canon, written by Mark the Monk, Bishop of Hydrous and Kosmas of the Holy City, with irmoi by Kassiani the Nun. The high-point of the much-loved Canon is Ode 9, which takes the form of a dialogue between Christ and the Theotokos, with Christ promising His Mother the hope of the Resurrection. This Canon will be sung again the following night at the Midnight Office.

Lauds follows, and its stichera take the form of a funeral lament, while always preserving the hope of the Resurrection. The doxasticon links Christ's rest in the tomb with His rest on the seventh day of creation, and the theotokion ("Most blessed art thou, O Virgin Theotokos...) is the same as is used on Sundays.

At the end of the Great Doxology, while the Trisagion is sung, the epitaphios is taken in procession around the outside of the church, and is then returned to the tomb. Some churches observe the practice of holding the epitaphios at the door, above waist level, so the faithful must bow down under it as they come back into the church, symbolizing their entering into the death and resurrection of Christ. The epitaphios will lie in the tomb until the Paschal Service early Sunday morning. In some churches, the epitaphios is never left alone, but is accompanied 24 hours a day by a reader chanting from the Psalter.

When the procession has returned to the church, a troparion is read, similar to the ones read at the Sixth Hour throughout Lent, focusing on the purpose of Christ's burial. A series of prokimena and readings are then said:

- The first prokimenon is from Psalm 43 (44): 'Arise, Lord, and help us: and deliver us for Thy Name's sake.'
- Ezekiel 37:1–14 – God tells Ezekiel to command bones to come to life.
- The second prokimenon is from Psalm 9 (9–10), and is based on the verses sung at the kathismata and Lauds on Sundays: 'Arise, O Lord my God, lift up Thine hand: forget not Thy poor forever.'
- 1 Corinthians 5:6–8; Galatians 3:13–14 – St. Paul celebrates the Passion of Christ and explains its role in the life of Gentile Christians.
- The Alleluia verses are from Psalm 67 (68), and are based on the Paschal verses: 'Let God arise, and let His enemies be scattered.'
- Matthew 27:62–66 – The Pharisees ask Pilate to set a watch at the tomb.

At the end of the service, a final hymn is sung as the faithful come to venerate the Epitaphios.

== Roman Catholic ==
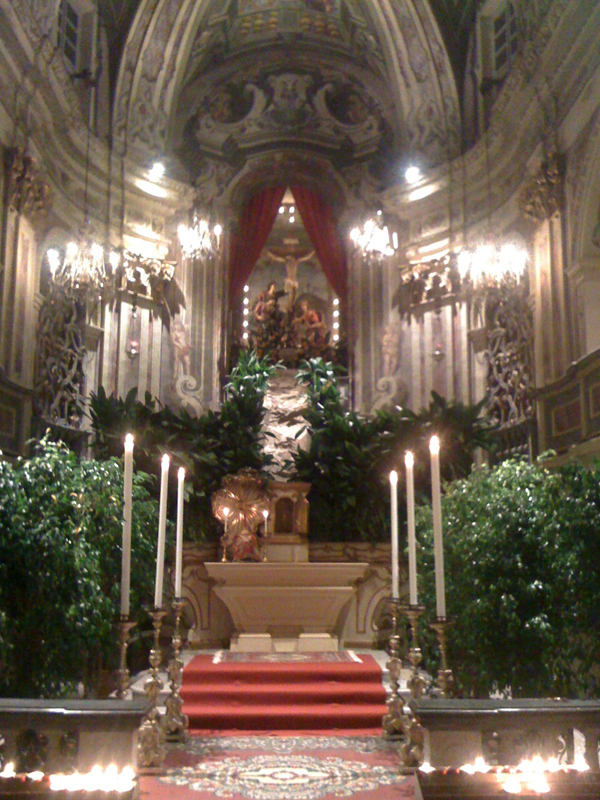
Good Friday at San Giovannino church in Alessandria, Italy

In Latin, the name used by the Catholic Church until 1955 was Feria sexta in Parasceve ("Friday of Preparation [for the Sabbath]"). In the 1955 reform of Holy Week, it was renamed Feria sexta in Passione et Morte Domini ("Friday of the Passion and Death of the Lord"), and in the new rite introduced in 1970, shortened to Feria sexta in Passione Domini ("Friday of the Passion of the Lord").

=== Day of Fasting ===
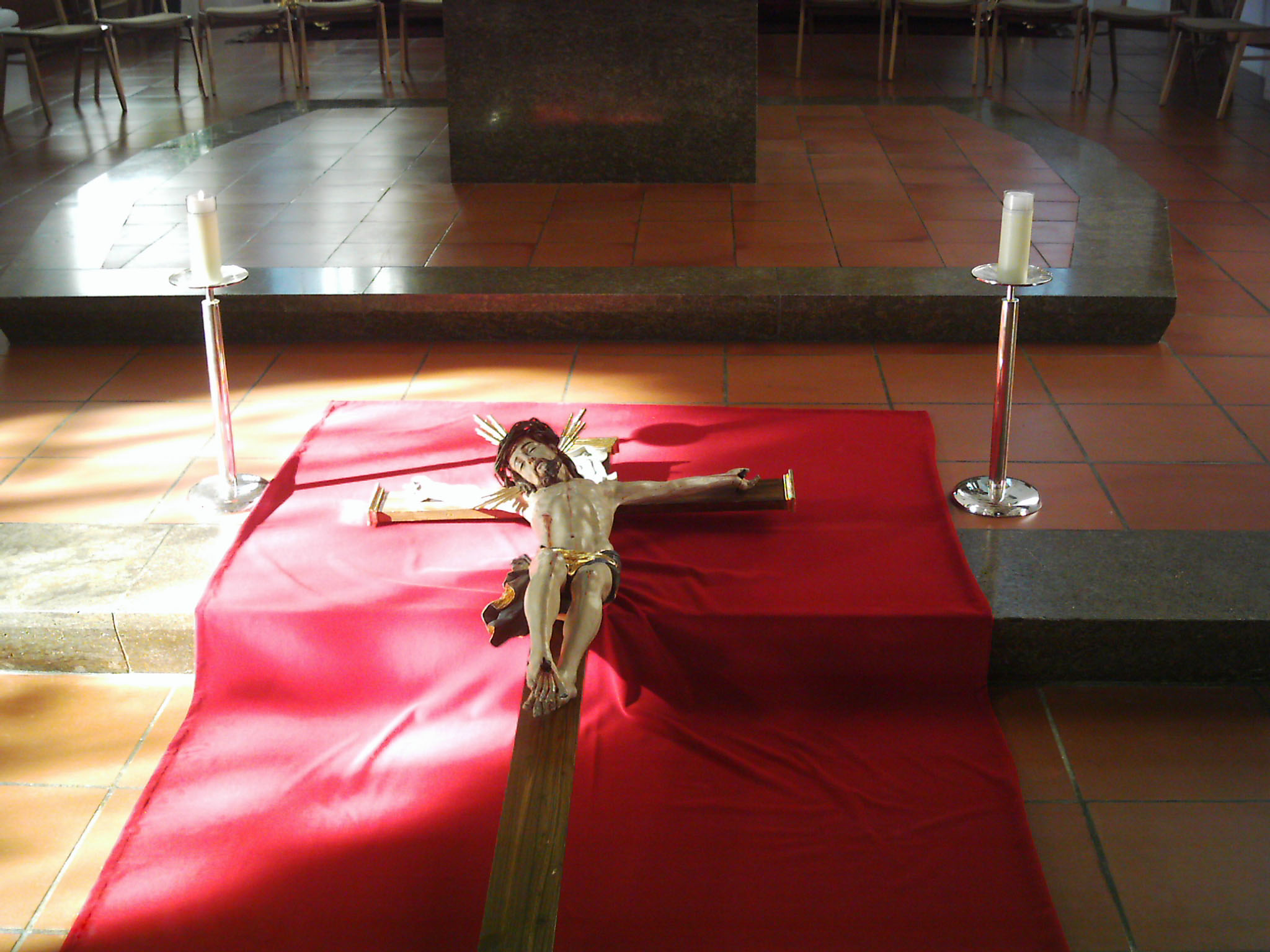
Crucifix prepared for veneration

The Catholic Church regards Good Friday and Holy Saturday as the Paschal fast, in accordance with Article 110 of Sacrosanctum Concilium. In the Latin Church, a fast day is understood as having only one full meal and two collations (a smaller repast, the two of which together do not equal the one full meal) – although this may be observed less stringently on Holy Saturday than on Good Friday.

=== Services on the day ===
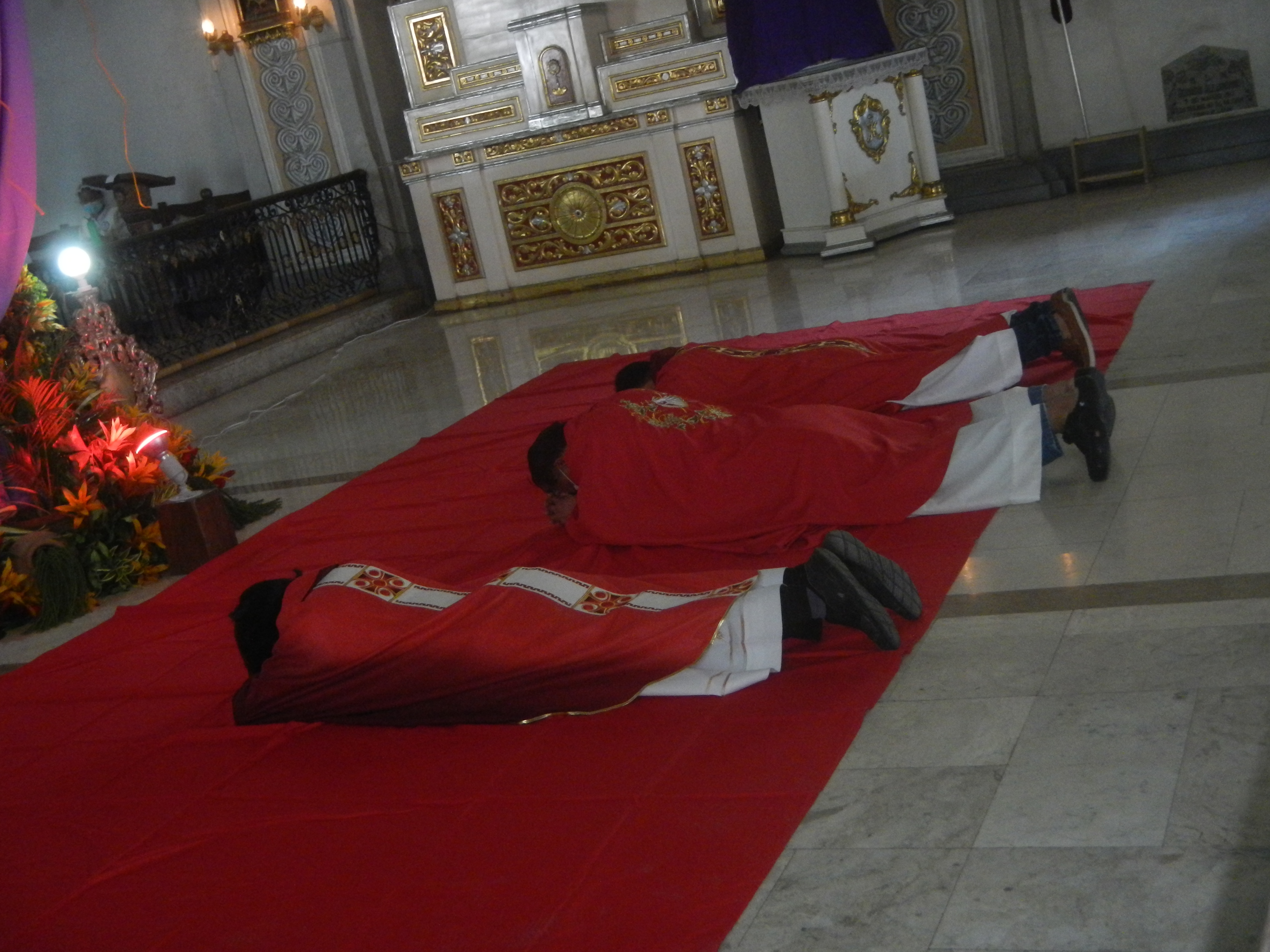
At the start of a Good Friday service, the priest and deacon (if any) lie flat on the floor as a sign of humility, grief and sorrow at the sacrifice of Christ on the cross.

The Roman Rite has no celebration of Mass between the Mass of the Lord's Supper on Holy Thursday (Maundy Thursday) evening and the Easter Vigil unless a special exemption is granted for rare solemn or grave occasions by the Vatican or the local bishop. The only sacraments celebrated during this time are Baptism (for those in danger of death), Penance, and Anointing of the Sick. While there is no celebration of the Eucharist, it is distributed to the faithful only in the Celebration of the Passion of the Lord, but can also be taken at any hour to the sick who are unable to attend this celebration.

The Collection for the Holy Places is taken up on Good Friday.

The Celebration of the Passion of the Lord takes place in the afternoon, ideally at three o'clock; however, for pastoral reasons (especially in countries where Good Friday is not a public holiday), it is permissible to celebrate the liturgy earlier, even shortly after midday, or at a later hour. The celebration consists of three parts: the liturgy of the word, the adoration of the cross, and the Holy communion. The altar is bare, without cross, candlesticks and altar cloths. It is also customary to empty the holy water fonts in preparation of the blessing of the water at the Easter Vigil. Traditionally, no bells are rung on Good Friday or Holy Saturday until the Easter Vigil.

The liturgical colour of the vestments used is red. Before 1970, vestments were black except for the Communion part of the rite when violet was used. If a bishop or abbot celebrates, he wears a plain mitre (mitra simplex). Before the reforms of the Holy Week liturgies in 1955, black was used throughout.

Aside from the celebration of the Solemn Liturgy of the Passion the usual offices of the Liturgy of the Hours are said by all those canonically required and celebrated publicly in religious communities. The liturgy consists of the normal major hours of Matins and Laudes (these first two morning services are often combined to form the office of Good Friday Tenebrae), the minor hours of Terce, Sext and None. It excludes the evening major and minor hours, Vespers and Compline respectively, which are only prayed by those who are unable to attend a celebration of the Liturgy of the Passion, giving the days pattern of worship an abrupt conclusion representing Jesus's death.

=== Three Hours' Agony ===
The Three Hours' Devotion based on the Seven Last Words from the Cross begins at noon and ends at 3 pm, the time that the Christian tradition teaches that Jesus died on the cross.

=== Liturgy ===
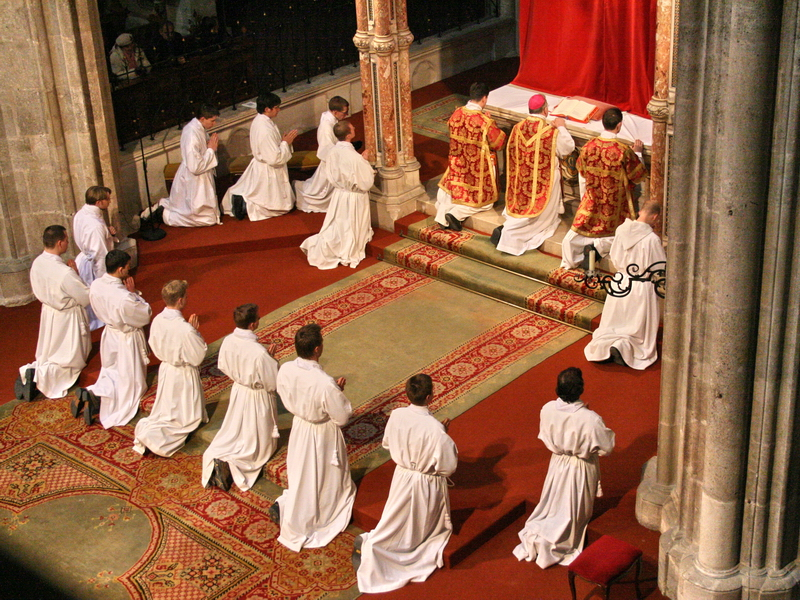
The Great Intercessions are sung at Heiligenkreuz Abbey, Austria

The Good Friday liturgy consists of three parts: the Liturgy of the Word, the Veneration of the Cross, and the Holy Communion.

- The Liturgy of the Word consists of the clergy and assisting ministers entering in complete silence, without any singing. They then silently make a full prostration. This signifies the abasement (the fall) of (earthly) humans. It also symbolizes the grief and sorrow of the Church. Then follows the Collect prayer, and the reading or chanting of Isaiah 52:13–53:12, Hebrews 4:14–16, Hebrews 5:7–9, and the Passion account from the Gospel of John, traditionally divided between three deacons, yet usually read by the celebrant and two other readers. In the older form of the Mass known as the Tridentine Mass the readings for Good Friday are taken from Exodus 12:1–11 and the Gospel according to St. John (John 18:1–40); (John 19:1–42).
- The Great Intercessions also known as orationes sollemnes immediately follows the Liturgy of the Word and consists of a series of prayers for the Church, the Pope, the clergy and laity of the Church, those preparing for baptism, the unity of Christians, the Jews, those who do not believe in Christ, those who do not believe in God, those in public office, and those in special need. After each prayer intention, the deacon calls the faithful to kneel for a short period of private prayer; the celebrant then sums up the prayer intention with a Collect-style prayer. As part of the pre-1955 Holy Week Liturgy, the kneeling was omitted only for the prayer for the Jews.
- The Adoration of the Cross has a crucifix, not necessarily the one that is normally on or near the altar at other times of the year, solemnly unveiled and displayed to the congregation, and then venerated by them, individually if possible and usually by kissing the wood of the cross, while hymns and the Improperia ("Reproaches") with the Trisagion hymn are chanted.
- Holy Communion is bestowed according to a rite based on that of the final part of Mass, beginning with the Lord's Prayer, but omitting the ceremony of "Breaking of the Bread" and its related acclamation, the Agnus Dei. The Eucharist, consecrated at the evening Mass of the Lord's Supper on Maundy Thursday, is distributed at this service. Before the Holy Week reforms of Pope Pius XII in 1955, only the priest received Communion in the framework of what was called the Mass of the Presanctified, which included the usual Offertory prayers, with the placing of wine in the chalice, but which omitted the Canon of the Mass. The priest and people then depart in silence, and the altar cloth is removed, leaving the altar bare except for the crucifix and two or four candlesticks.

=== Stations of the Cross ===
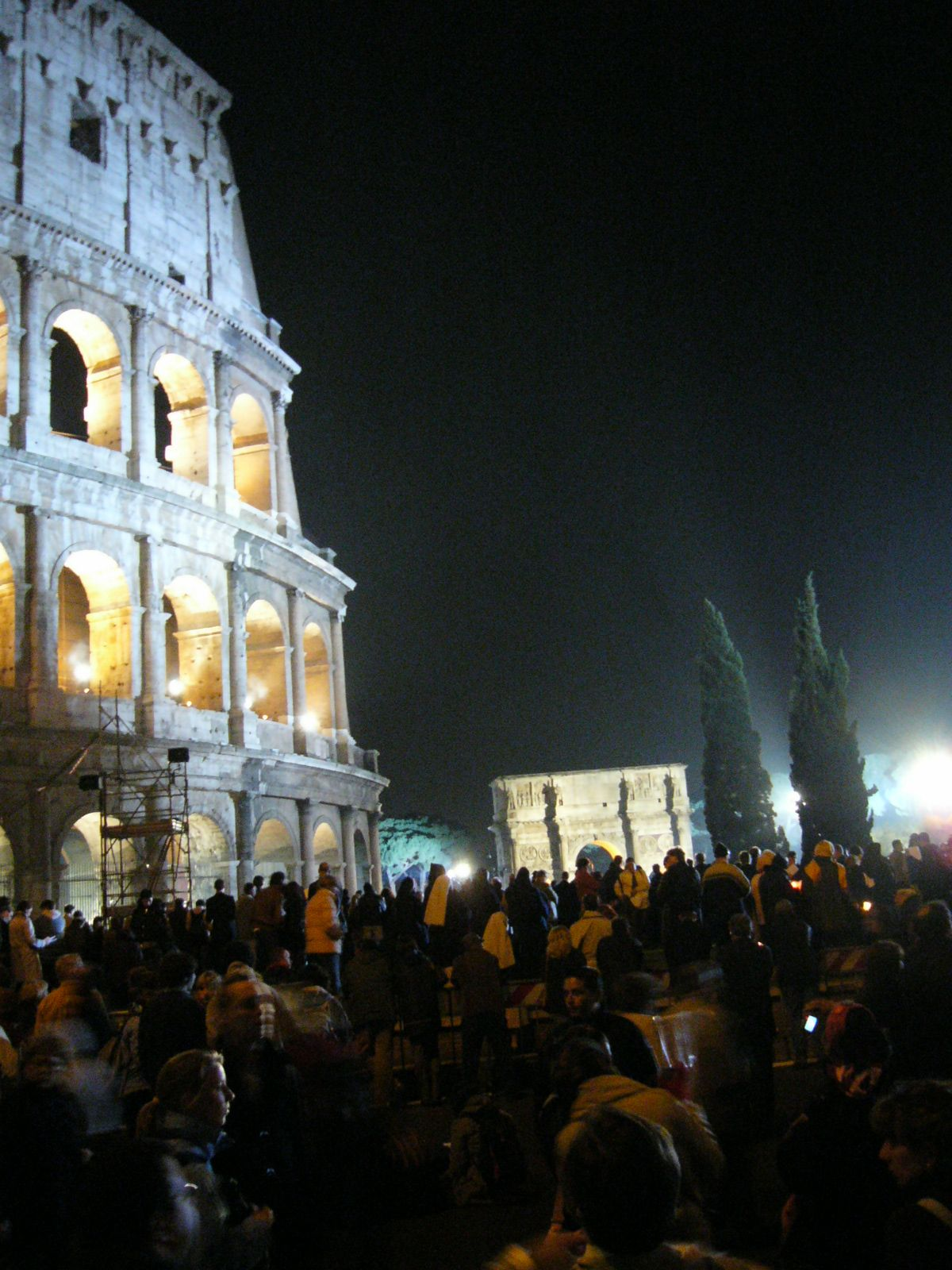
The Way of the Cross, celebrated at the Colosseum in Rome on Good Friday

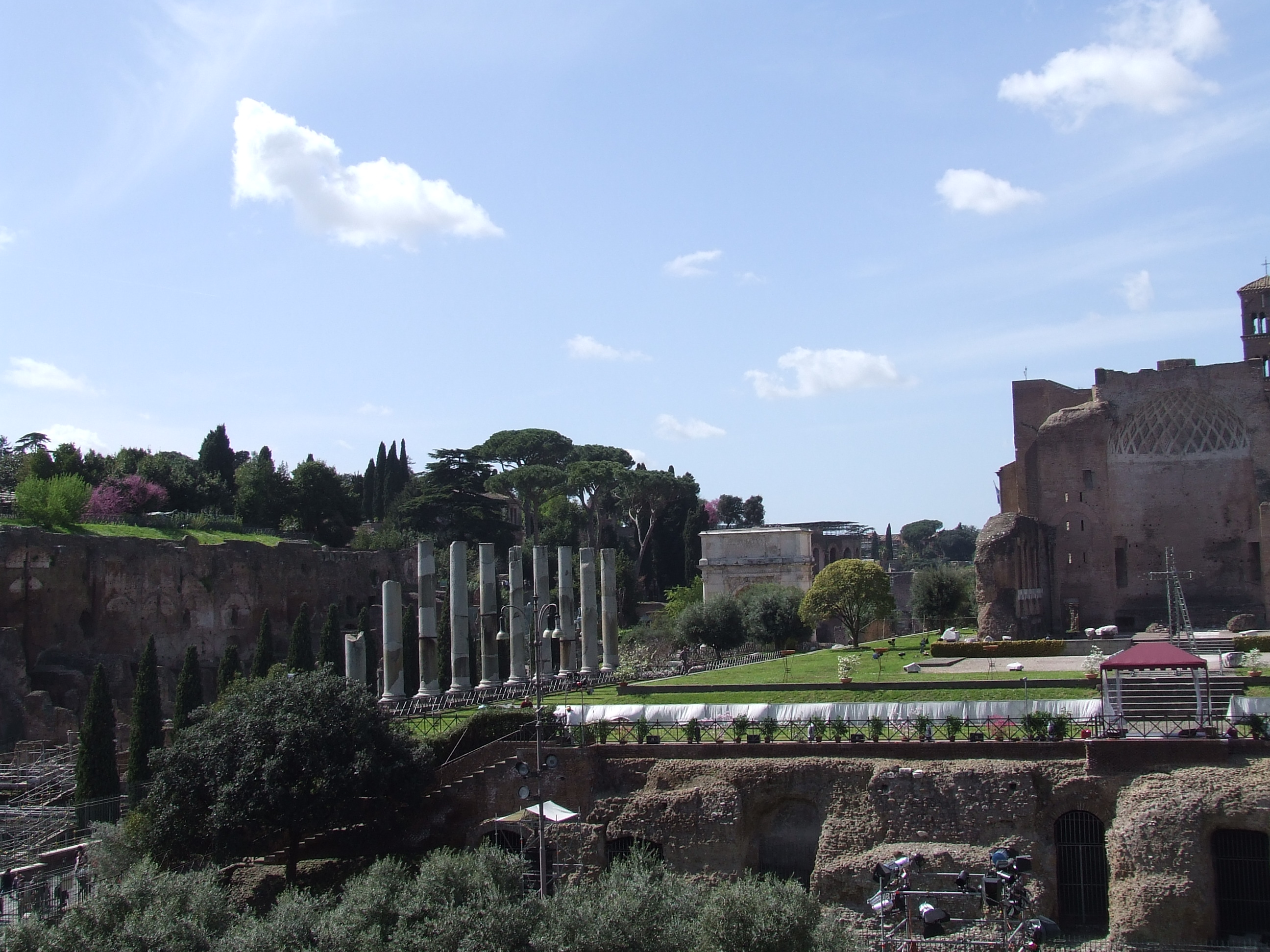
Canopy erected at the "Temple of Venus and Rome" during the "Way of the Cross" ceremony in Rome

In addition to the prescribed liturgical service, the Stations of the Cross are often prayed either in the church or outside, and a prayer service may be held from midday to 3.00 pm, known as the Three Hours' Agony. In countries such as Malta, Italy, the Philippines, Puerto Rico and Spain, processions with statues representing the Passion of Christ are held.

In Rome, since the papacy of John Paul II, the heights of the Temple of Venus and Roma and their position opposite the main entrance to the Colosseum have been used to good effect as a public address platform. This may be seen in the photograph below where a red canopy has been erected to shelter the Pope as well as an illuminated cross, on the occasion of the Way of the Cross ceremony. The Pope, either personally or through a representative, leads the faithful through meditations on the stations of the cross while a cross is carried from there to the Colosseum.

=== Plenary indulgence ===
In the Roman Catholic Church, plenary indulgence is obtained if the faithful venerates the cross with piety in the solemn Celebration of the Passion of the Lord on Good Friday.

=== Novena to the Divine Mercy ===
The novena to the Divine Mercy begins on that day and lasts until the Saturday before Divine Mercy Sunday. Both days are linked in terms of content, as the mercy of God flows from the Sacred Heart of Jesus that was pierced on the cross.

=== Collecta Pro Terra Sancta ===
Paul VI established the Collecta Pro Terra Sancta to be held on Good Friday, a fundraising that was confirmed by all subsequent popes.

== Protestant ==
=== Lutheran Church ===
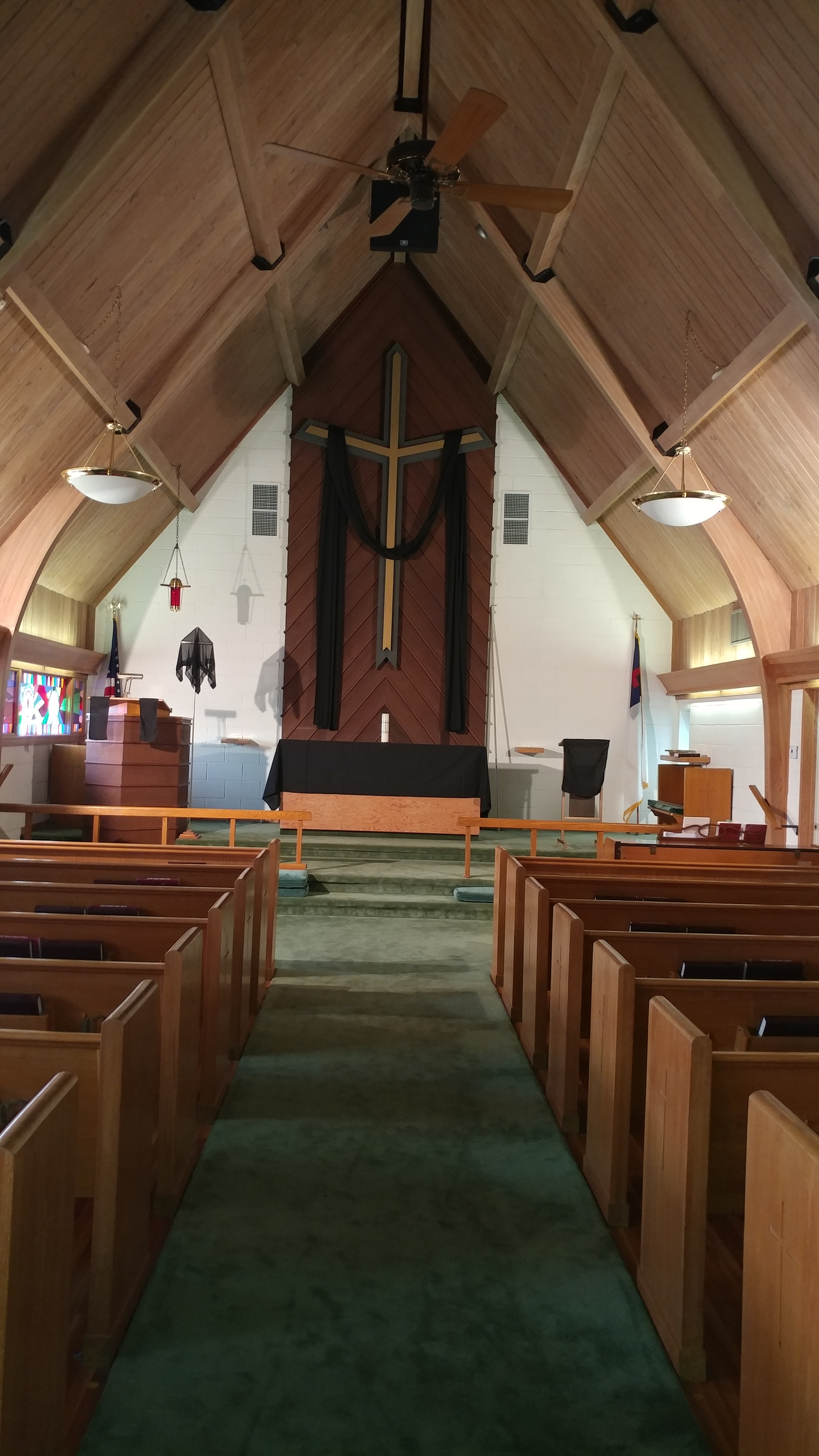
The chancel of this Lutheran church is adorned with black paraments on Good Friday, the liturgical colour associated with Good Friday in the Lutheran Churches.

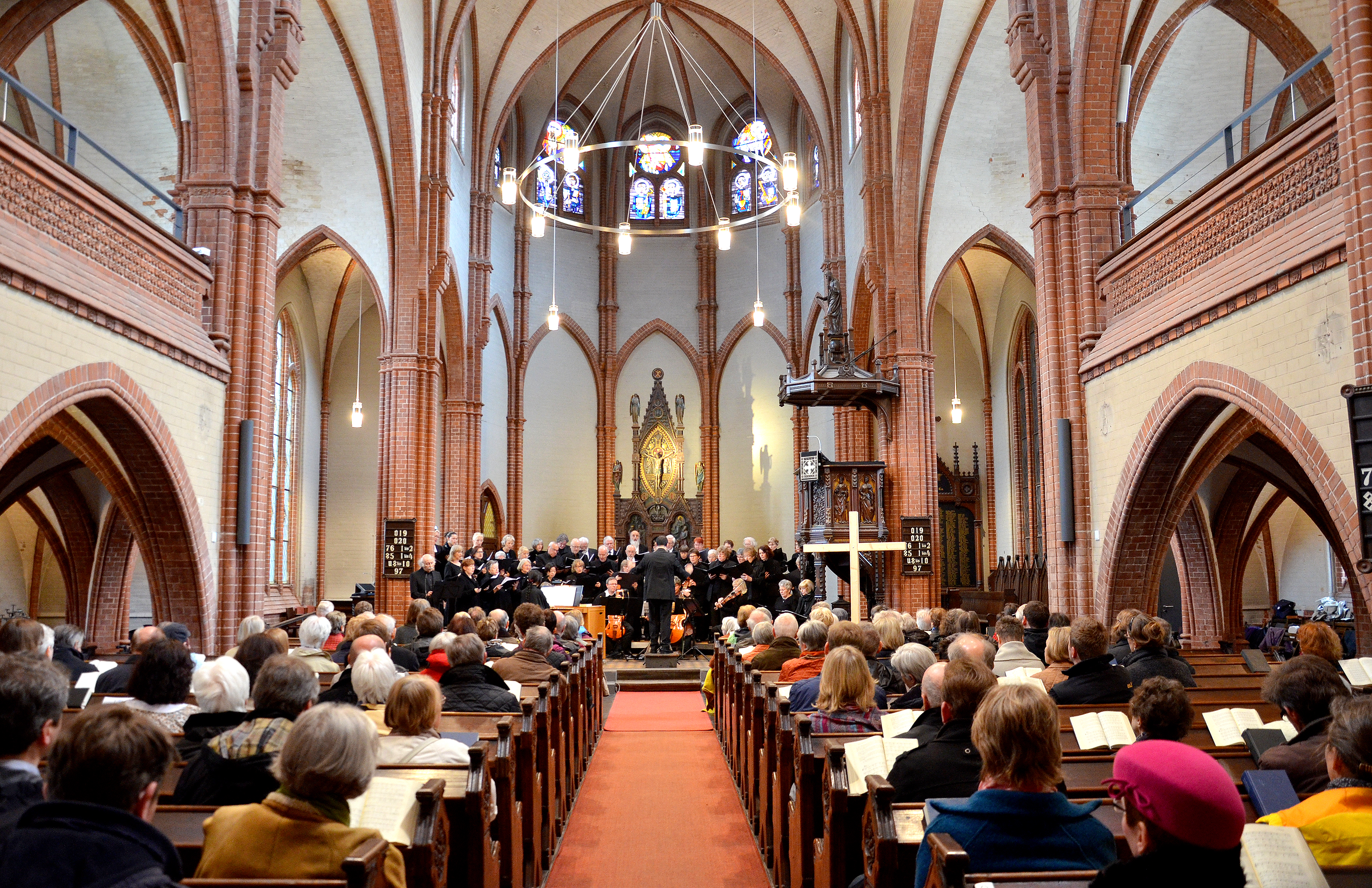
Good Friday service in a Lutheran church in Hanover, Germany, 2014

In Lutheran tradition from the 16th to the 20th century, Good Friday is one of the most important religious holidays, abstention from all worldly works was expected. During that time, Lutheranism had no restrictions on the celebration of the Eucharist on Good Friday; on the contrary, it was a prime day on which to receive the Eucharist, and services were often accentuated by special music such as the St Matthew Passion by Johann Sebastian Bach. The liturgical movement led to the observance of Good Friday as part of the larger sweep of the great Three Days (Paschal Triduum): Maundy Thursday, Good Friday, and the Vigil of Easter. The three days remain one liturgy which celebrates the death and resurrection of Jesus. As part of the liturgy of the three days, Lutherans generally fast from the Eucharist on Good Friday. Rather, it is celebrated in remembrance of the Last Supper on Maundy Thursday and at the Vigil of Easter. On Good Friday, the main liturgy (Swedish: Långfredagens gudstjänst) is that of the Liturgy of the Lord's Passion, usually held at 3 pm. In the evening, Lutheran congregations may observe the Stations of the Cross, or the tenebrae, with the latter typically conducted in candlelight and consisting of a collection of passion accounts from the four gospels (though other Lutheran congregations may typically observe the tenebrae on Spy Wednesday).

The Good Friday liturgy appointed in Evangelical Lutheran Worship, the worship book of the Evangelical Lutheran Church in America, specifies a liturgy similar to the revised Roman Catholic liturgy for Good Friday. A rite for adoration of the crucified Christ includes the optional singing of the Solemn Reproaches. At noon, a number of Lutheran churches observe the Three Hours' Agony service centered on the remembrance of the Seven Last Words from the Cross, sayings of Jesus assembled from the four gospels.

Along with observing a general Lenten fast, many Lutherans emphasize the importance of Good Friday as a day of fasting within the calendar. A Handbook for the Discipline of Lent recommends the Lutheran guideline to "Fast on Ash Wednesday and Good Friday with only one simple meal during the day, usually without meat".

=== Anglican Communion ===
In the Anglican Communion, the Black Fast has been historically observed by devout believers. The Black Fast was especially popular during the 19th century as it sought to imitate "the fasting of the ancient church."

The 1662 Book of Common Prayer did not specify a particular rite to be observed on Good Friday but local custom came to mandate an assortment of services, including the Seven Last Words from the Cross and a three-hour service consisting of Matins, Ante-communion (using the Reserved Sacrament in high church parishes) and Evensong. In recent times, revised editions of the Prayer Book and Common Worship have re-introduced pre-Reformation forms of observance of Good Friday corresponding to those in today's Roman Catholic Church, with special nods to the rites that had been observed in the Church of England prior to the Henrican, Edwardian and Elizabethan reforms, including Creeping to the Cross.

=== Methodist Church ===
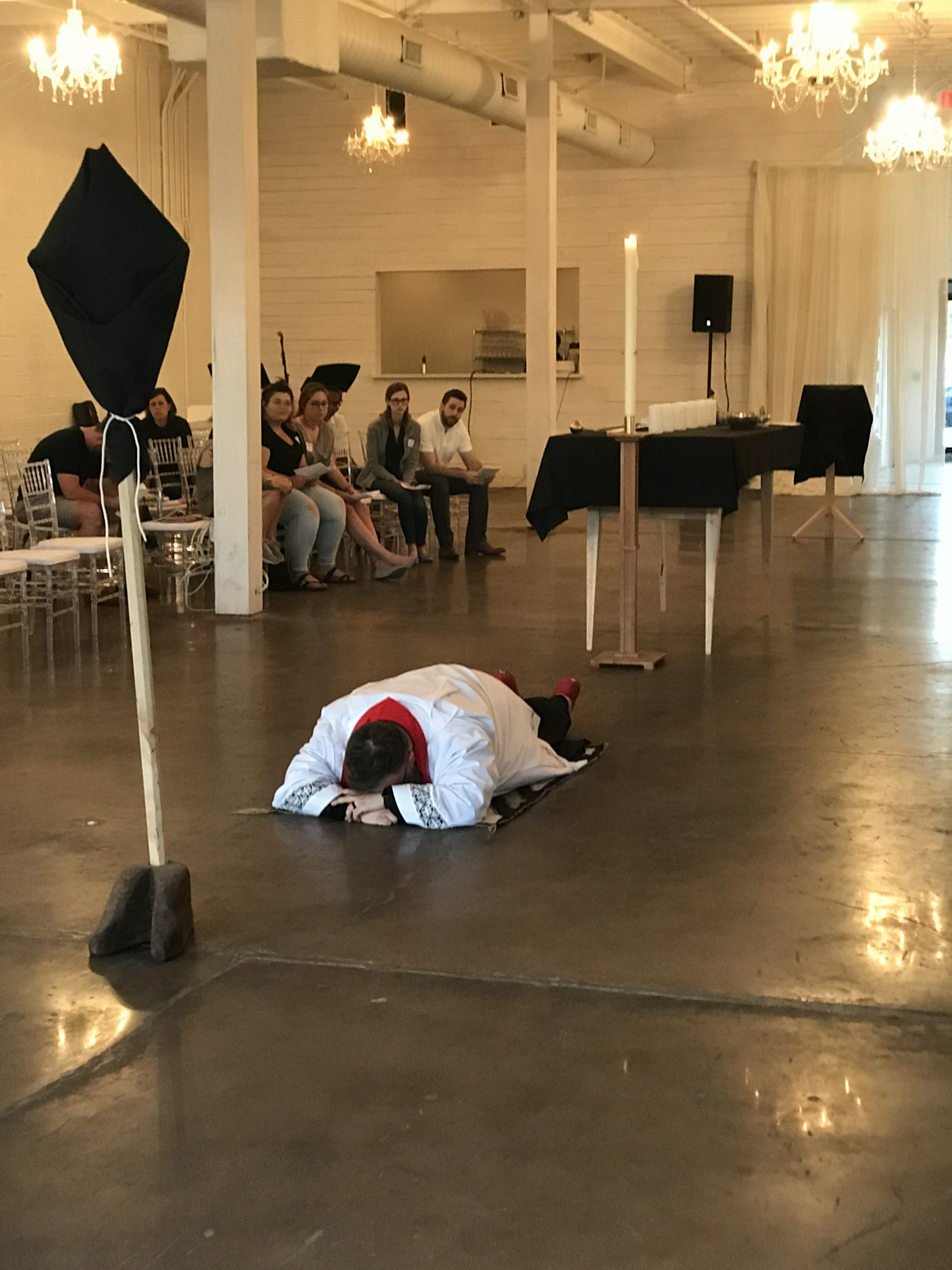
A United Methodist minister prostrates at the start of the Good Friday liturgy at Holy Family Church, in accordance with the rubrics in the Book of Worship. The processional cross is veiled in black, the liturgical colour associated with Good Friday in Methodist Churches.

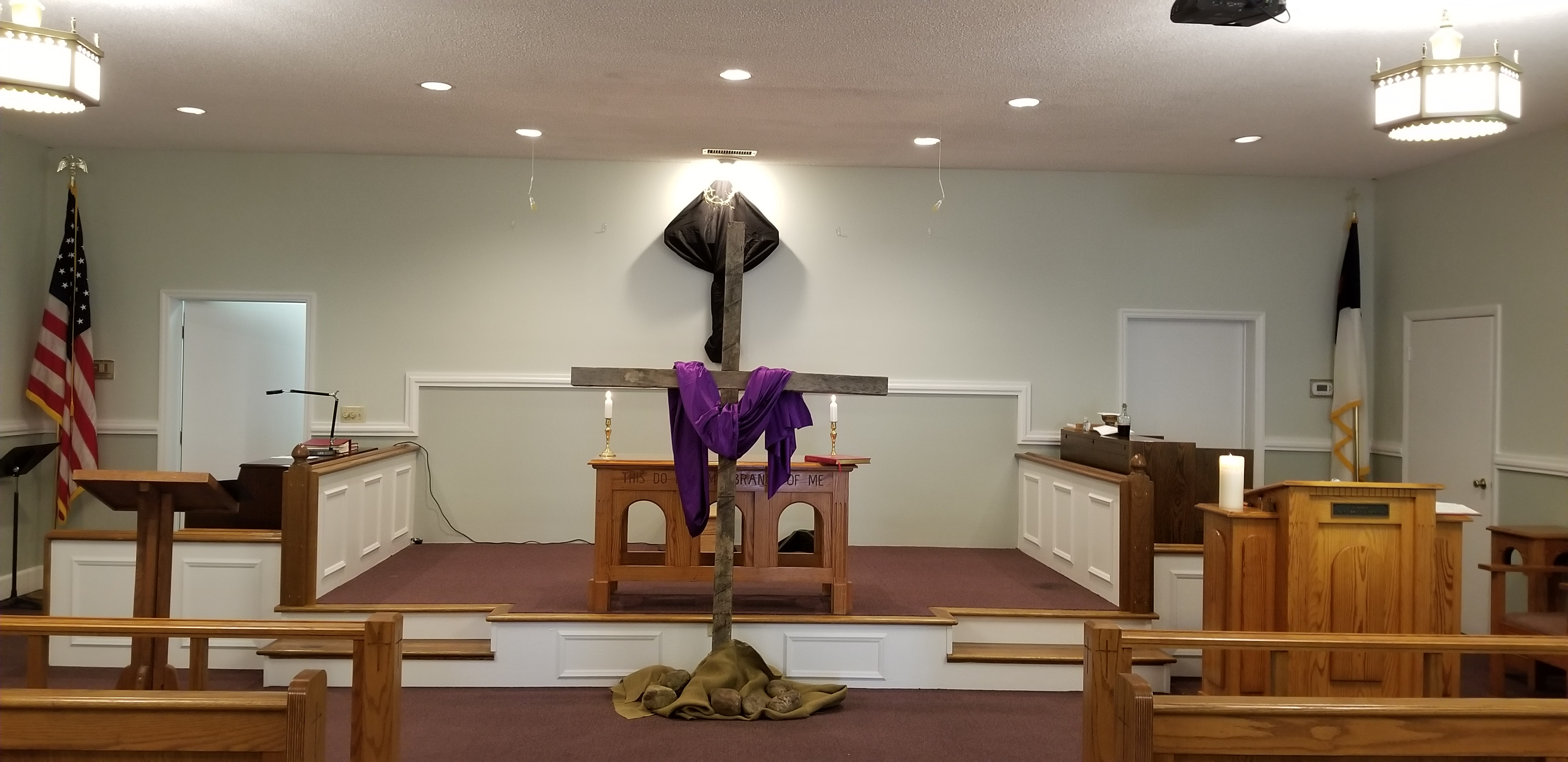
Altar and cross veiled in a Methodist church on Maundy Thursday in preparation for Good Friday

Many Methodist denominations commemorate Good Friday with fasting, as well as a service of worship based on the Seven Last Words from the Cross; this liturgy is known as the Three Hours Devotion as it starts at noon and concludes at 3 pm, the latter being the time that Jesus died on the cross.

On Maundy Thursday, the altar and the cross are usually veiled in black for Good Friday, as black is the liturgical colour for Good Friday in the United Methodist Church. A wooden cross may sit in front of the bare chancel.

=== Moravian Church ===
Moravians hold a Lovefeast on Good Friday as they receive Holy Communion on Maundy Thursday.

Communicants of the Moravian Church practice the Good Friday tradition of cleaning gravestones in Moravian cemeteries.

=== Reformed Churches ===
In the Reformed tradition, Good Friday is one of the evangelical feasts and is thus widely observed with church services, which feature the Solemn Reproaches in the pattern of Psalm 78, towards the end of the liturgy.

=== Other Christian traditions ===
Many Protestant churches hold an Interdenominational service with Lord's Supper.

== Associated customs ==
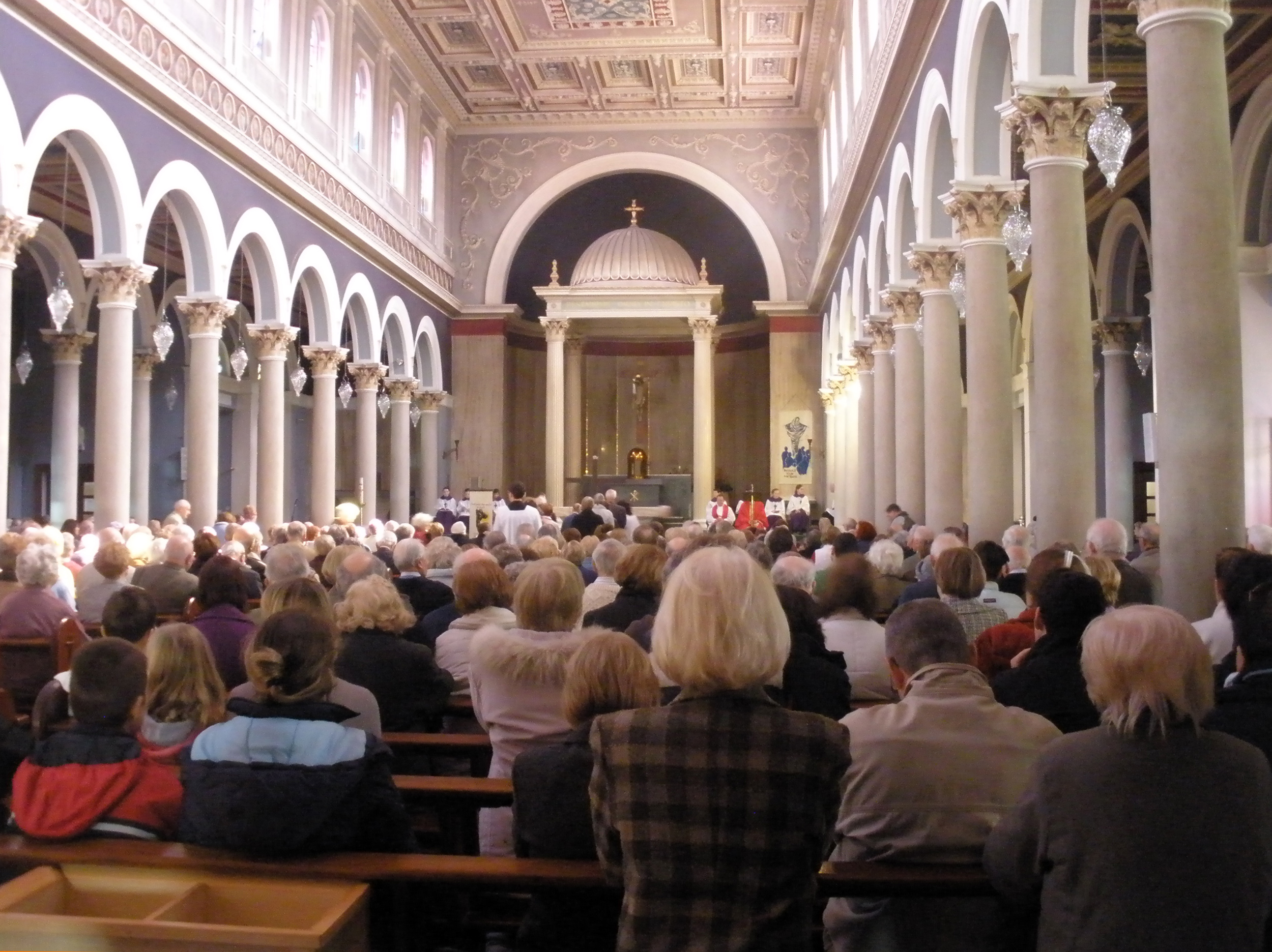
Good Friday service in a Catholic church, Ireland

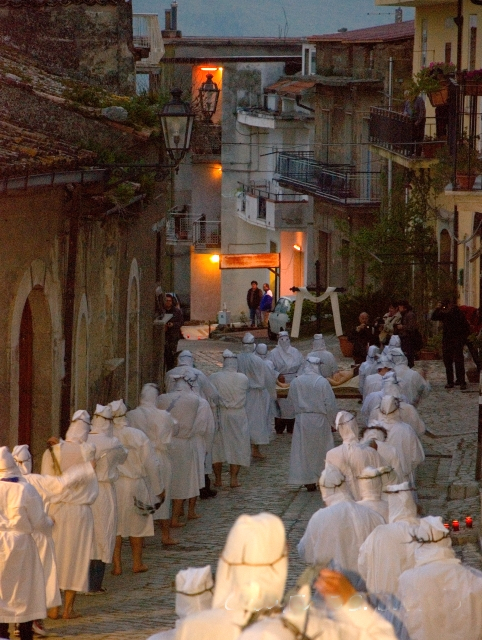
Good Friday procession in San Lorenzo Maggiore, Italy

Good Friday procession with the mourning women of Romont, Switzerland

In many countries and territories with a strong Christian tradition such as Australia, Argentina, Bermuda, Brazil, Canada, the countries of the Caribbean, Chile, Colombia, Costa Rica, Czech Republic, Ecuador, Finland, Germany, Hungary, Latvia, Malta, Mexico, New Zealand, Peru, the Philippines, Portugal, the Scandinavian countries, Singapore, Spain, Switzerland, the United Kingdom, and Venezuela, the day is observed as a public or federal holiday. In the United States, 12 states observe Good Friday as state holiday: Connecticut, Texas, Delaware, Hawaii, Indiana, Tennessee, Florida, Kentucky, Louisiana, New Jersey, North Carolina and North Dakota. One associated custom is strict adherence to the Black Fast, where believers fast from food and liquids during the day and after sunset, a vegetarian meal with water is consumed. St. Ambrose, St. Chrysostom and St. Basil attest to the practice.

The processions of the day, hymns "Crux fidelis" by King John of Portugal, and Eberlin's "Tenebrae factae sunt", followed by "Vexilla Regis" is sung, translated from Latin as the standards of the King advance, and then follows a ceremony that is not a real Mass, it is called the "Mass of the Pre-Sanctified.". This custom is respected also by forgoing the Mass, this is to take heed to the solemnity of the Sacrifice of Calvary. This is where the host of the prior day is placed at the altar, incensed, elevated so "that it may be seen by the people" and consumed. Germany and some other countries have laws prohibiting certain acts, such as dancing and horse racing, that are seen as profaning the solemn nature of the day.

=== Australia ===
Good Friday is a holiday under state and territory laws in all states and territories in Australia. Generally speaking, shops in all Australian states (but not in the two territories of the Northern Territory and the Australian Capital Territory) are required to remain closed for the duration of Good Friday, although there are certain shops which are permitted to open and other shops can apply for exemptions. All schools and universities close on Good Friday in Australia, and Good Friday falls within the school holidays in most years in all states and territories except the Northern Territory, although many states now commence their school holidays in early April regardless of Easter. In 2024, for example, when Good Friday fell on 29 March, only Queensland, Victoria and Western Australia had school holidays which coincided with Good Friday. The vast majority of businesses are closed on Good Friday, although many recreational businesses, such as the Sydney Royal Easter Show, open on Good Friday as among non-religious families Good Friday is a popular day to indulge in such activities.

Cameroon

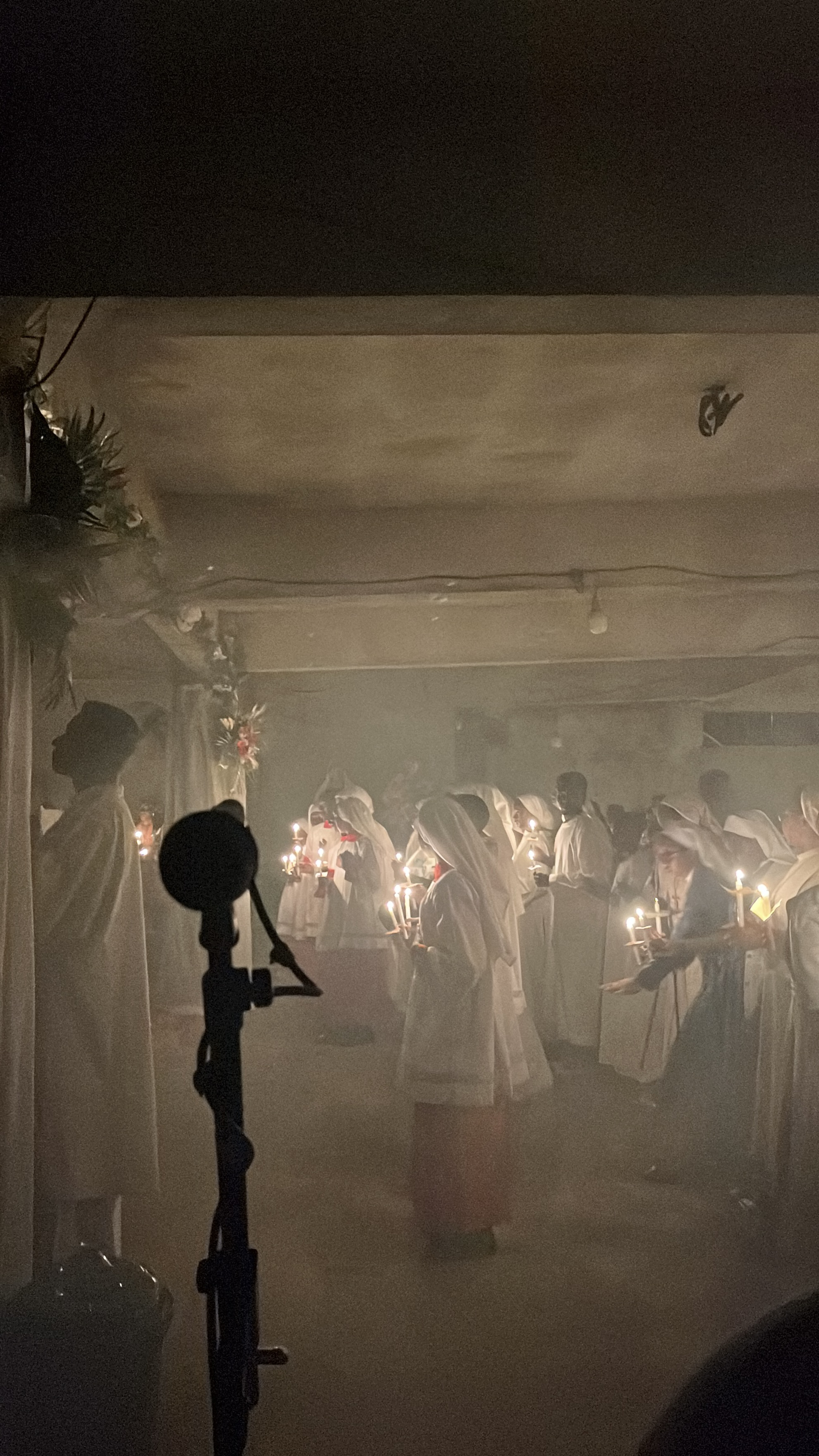
Easter Fire celebration to mark the resurrection of Jesus and the victory of light over darkness in Cameroon

=== Canada ===
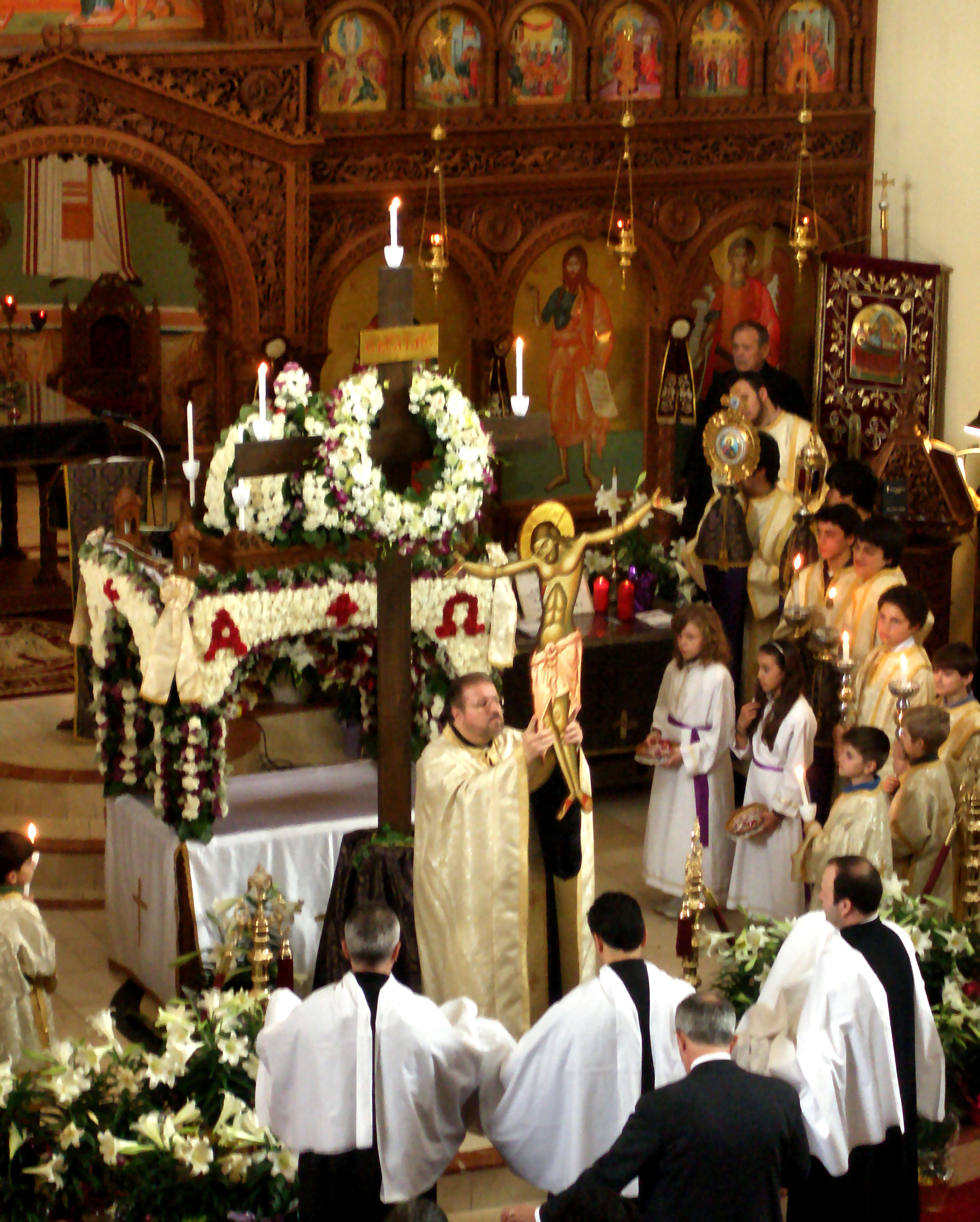
The descent from the cross, commemorated in Vespers of Holy and Great Friday, Greek Orthodox Cathedral in Toronto, Canada

In Canada, Good Friday is a federal statutory holiday. In the province of Quebec "employers can choose to give the day off either on Good Friday or Easter Monday."

=== Cuba ===
In an online article posted on Catholic News Agency by Alejandro Bermúdez on 31 March 2012, Cuban President Raúl Castro, with the Communist Party and his advisers, decreed that Good Friday that year would be a holiday. This was Castro's response to a request made personally to him by Pope Benedict XVI during the latter's Apostolic Visitation to the island and León, Mexico that month. The move followed the pattern of small advances in Cuba's relations with the Vatican, mirroring Pope John Paul II's success in getting Fidel Castro to declare Christmas Day a holiday. Both Good Friday and Christmas are now annual holidays in Cuba.

=== Germany ===
In Germany Good Friday is known as Karfreitag (kara means "sorrow" in Old High German); it is a Stiller Feiertag (silent holiday), and there are strict rules banning activities deemed disrespectful to Christians. Rules vary among the sixteen different federal states, but often prohibit dancing and the use of loud appliances such as lawnmowers and leaf blowers. Nightclubs are shut, and films that may be shown in cinemas are restricted.

In recent times the holiday has been informally called Carfreitag by extreme car enthusiasts, including those from other countries who visit Germany, who tune cars illegally and hold illegal races on public roads. Police seek to prevent unauthorised tuning, illegal races, noise, and pollution. Offenders can be fined and have points put on their licences, and in some cases lose their licences and have their cars confiscated.

=== Hong Kong ===
In Hong Kong, Good Friday was designated a public holiday in the Holidays Ordinance, 1875. Good Friday continues to be a holiday after the transfer of sovereignty from the UK to China in 1997. Government offices, banks, post offices and most offices are closed on Good Friday.

=== Ireland ===
In the Republic of Ireland, Good Friday is not an official public holiday, but most non-retail businesses close for the day. Up until 2018 it was illegal to sell alcoholic beverages on Good Friday, with some exceptions, so pubs and off-licences generally closed. Critics of the ban included the catering and tourism sector, but surveys showed that the general public were divided on the issue. In Northern Ireland, a similar ban operates until 5 pm on Good Friday.

=== Malaysia ===
Although Malaysia is a Muslim majority country, Good Friday is declared as a public holiday in the states of Sabah and Sarawak in East Malaysia as there is a significant Christian indigenous population in both states.

=== Malta ===
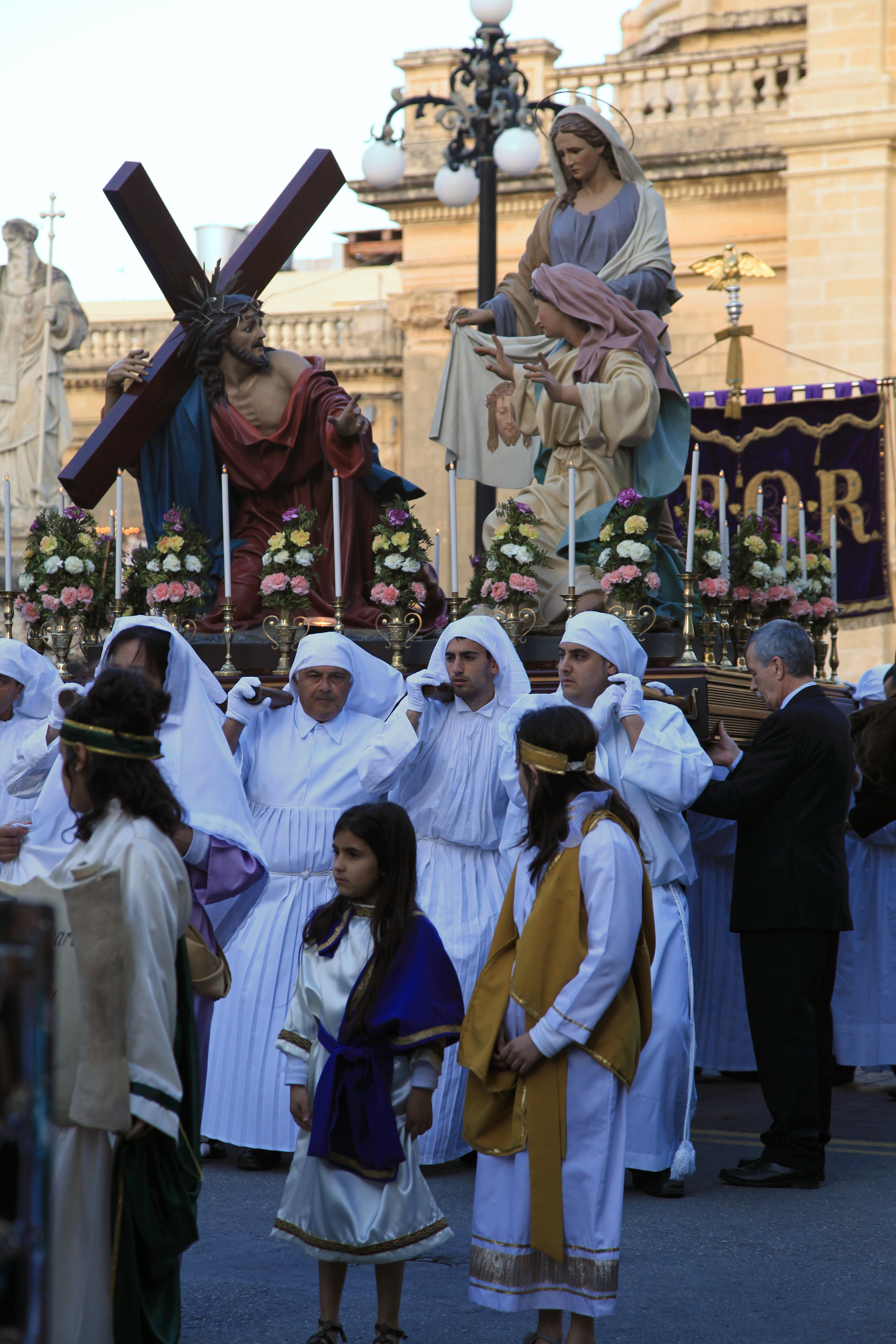
Holy Week procession in Malta

The Holy Week commemorations reach their peak on Good Friday as the Roman Catholic Church celebrates the Passion of Jesus. Solemn celebrations take place in all churches together with processions in different villages around Malta and Gozo. During the celebration, the narrative of the passion is read in some localities, while the Adoration of the Cross follows. Good Friday processions take place in Birgu, Bormla, Għaxaq, Luqa, Mosta, Naxxar, Paola, Qormi, Rabat, Senglea, Valletta, Żebbuġ (Città Rohan) and Żejtun. Processions in Gozo occur in Nadur, Victoria (St. George and Cathedral), Xagħra and Żebbuġ, Gozo.

=== New Zealand ===
In New Zealand, Good Friday is a legal holiday and is a day of mandatory school closure for all New Zealand state and integrated schools. Good Friday is also a restricted trading day in New Zealand, which means that unexempted shops are not permitted to open on this day.

=== Philippines ===
In the predominantly Roman Catholic Philippines, the day is commemorated with street processions, the Way of the Cross, the chanting of the Pasyón, Siete Palabras or the Seven Last Words of Jesus on the Cross, and performances of the Senákulo or Passion play. Some devotees engage in self-flagellation and even have themselves crucified as expressions of penance despite health risks and strong disapproval from the Church.

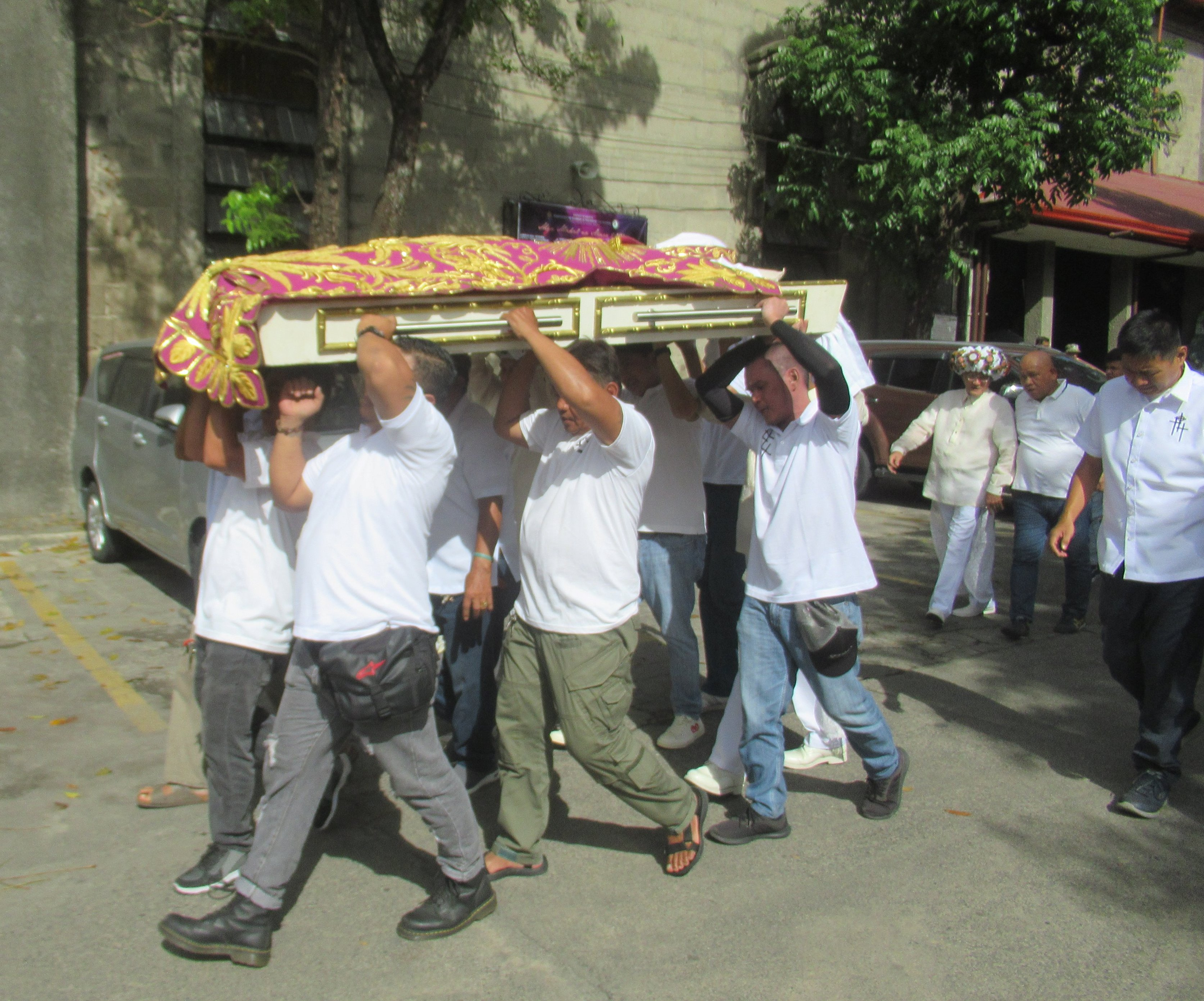
Station 14: Jesus is laid in the tomb (Baliwag Church, 2024)

Church bells are not rung and Masses are not celebrated, while television features movies, documentaries and other shows focused on the religious event and other topics related to the Catholic faith, broadcasting mostly religious content. Malls and shops are generally closed, as are restaurants as it is the second of three public holidays within the week.

After three o'clock in the afternoon (the time at which Jesus is traditionally believed to have died), the faithful venerate the cross in the local church and follow the procession of the Burial of Jesus.

In Cebu and many parts of the Visayan Islands, people usually eat binignit and biko as a form of fasting.

=== Poland ===
In Polish churches, a tableau of Christ's Tomb is unveiled in the sanctuary. Many of the faithful spend long hours into the night grieving at the Tomb, where it is customary to kiss the wounds on the Lord's body. A life-size figure of Jesus lying in his tomb is widely visited by the faithful, especially on Holy Saturday. The tableaux may include flowers, candles, figures of angels standing watch, and the three crosses atop Mt Calvary, and much more. Each parish strives to come up with the most artistically and religiously evocative arrangement in which the Blessed Sacrament, draped in a filmy veil, is prominently displayed.

=== Singapore ===
Good Friday is a public holiday in Singapore.

=== Spain ===
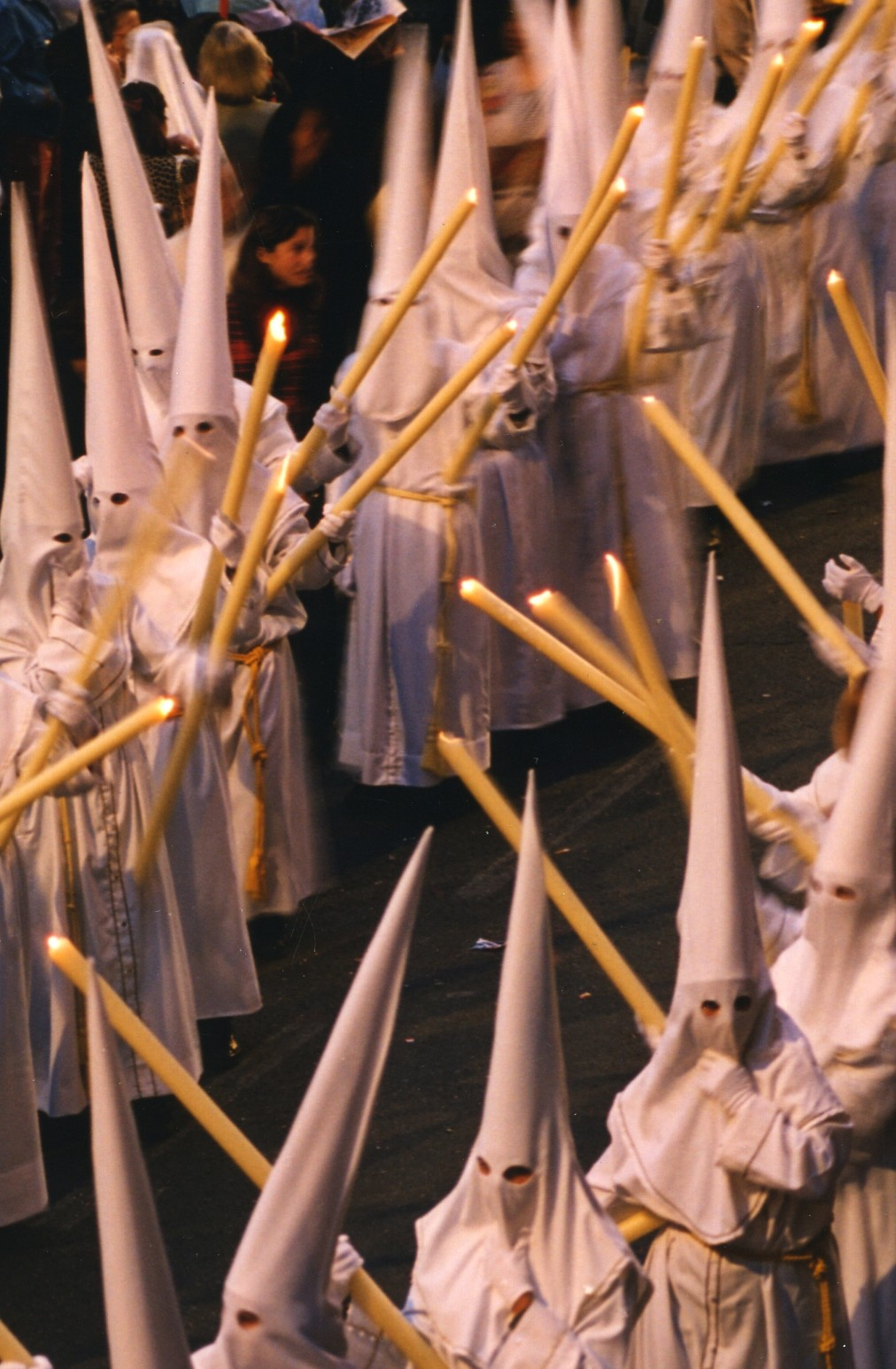
Nazarenos wearing capirotes, in Málaga, Spain

=== United Kingdom ===
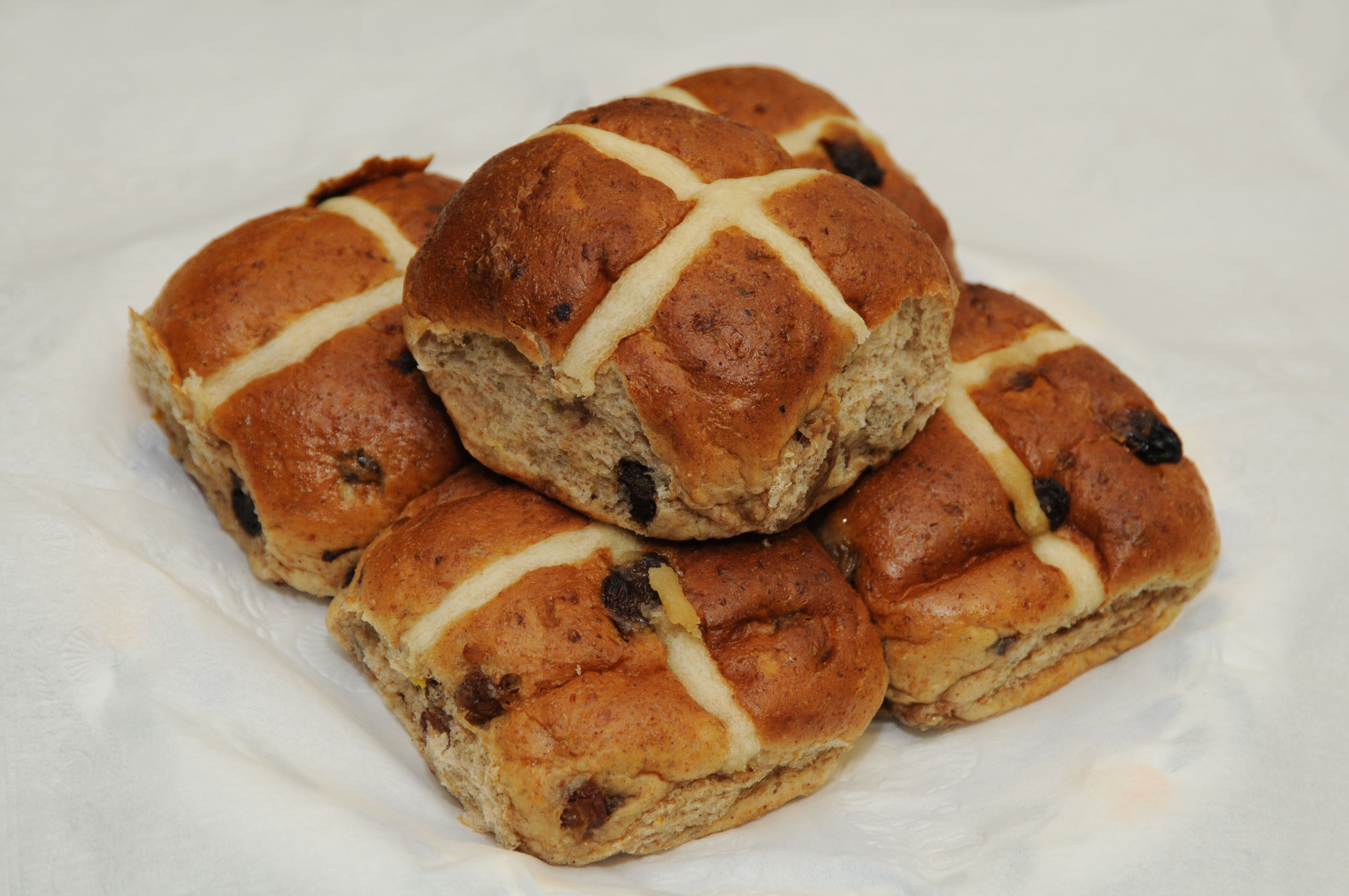
Hot cross buns are traditionally toasted and eaten on Good Friday in Britain, Canada, Australia and New Zealand.

In the UK Good Friday was historically a common law holiday; it is today recognised as an official public holiday (bank holiday). All state schools are closed and most businesses treat it as a holiday for staff; however, many retail stores remain open. Government services in Northern Ireland operate as normal on Good Friday, closing instead on Easter Tuesday.

There has traditionally been no horse racing on Good Friday in the UK. However, in 2008, betting shops and stores opened for the first time on this day, and in 2014 Lingfield Park and Musselburgh staged the UK's first Good Friday race meetings. The BBC Radio 4 7 am News broadcast on Good Friday is traditionally introduced with a verse from Isaac Watts' hymn "When I Survey the Wondrous Cross".

The tradition of Easter plays includes 1960 Eastertime performance of Good Friday: A Play in Verse (1916) Artists Ursula O'Leary (Procula), and William Devlin as Pontius Pilate, perform with the atmospheric sound effects of the BBC Radiophonic Workshop. The Hugh Stewart production for the Home Service used soundware such as the EMS Synthi 100 and ARP Odyssey l.

=== United States ===
In the United States, Good Friday is not a federal government holiday. The postal service operates, and banks regulated by the federal government do not close for Good Friday.

Some states, counties, municipalities, and territories observe the holiday. Good Friday is a state holiday in Connecticut, Delaware, Florida, Hawaii, Indiana, Kentucky (half-day), Louisiana, New Jersey, North Carolina, North Dakota, Tennessee and Texas, and in the territories of Guam, U.S. Virgin Islands, American Samoa, Northern Mariana Islands and Puerto Rico.

State and local government offices and courts are closed, as well as some banks and post offices in these states, and in those counties and municipalities where Good Friday is observed as a holiday.

The stock markets have chosen to be closed on Good Friday, but the foreign exchange and bond trading markets open for a partial business day. Some public schools and universities are closed on Good Friday if it falls within spring break.

In some governmental contexts Good Friday has been referred to by a generic name such as "spring holiday". In 1999, in the case of Bridenbaugh v. O'Bannon, an Indiana state employee sued the governor for giving state employees Good Friday as a day off. The US Seventh Circuit Court of Appeals ruled against the plaintiff, stating that the government could give state employees a paid day off when that day is a religious holiday, including Good Friday, but only so long as the state can provide a valid secular purpose that coincides with the obvious religious purpose of the holiday.

== Calculating the date ==
Dates for Good Friday 2019–2033 In Gregorian dates
Year	Western	Eastern
2019	April 19	April 26
2020	April 10	April 17
2021	April 2	April 30
2022	April 15	April 22
2023	April 7	April 14
2024	March 29	May 3
2025	April 18	
2026	April 3	April 10
2027	March 26	April 30
2028	April 14	
2029	March 30	April 6
2030	April 19	April 26
2031	April 11	
2032	March 26	April 30
2033	April 15	April 22

Good Friday is the Friday before Easter, which is calculated differently in Eastern Christianity and Western Christianity (see Computus for details). Easter falls on the first Sunday following the Paschal Full Moon, the full moon on or after 21 March, taken to be the date of the vernal equinox. The Western calculation uses the Gregorian calendar, while the Eastern calculation uses the Julian calendar, whose 21 March now corresponds to the Gregorian calendar's 3 April. The calculations for identifying the date of the full moon also differ.

In Eastern Christianity, Easter can fall between 22 March and 25 April on Julian Calendar (thus between 4 April and 8 May in terms of the Gregorian calendar, during the period 1900 and 2099), so Good Friday can fall between 20 March and 23 April, inclusive (or between 2 April and 6 May in terms of the Gregorian calendar).

Good Friday and other named days and day ranges around Lent and Easter in Western Christianity, with the fasting days of Lent numbered

== Cultural references ==
Good Friday assumes a particular importance in the plot of Richard Wagner's music drama Parsifal, which contains an orchestral interlude known as the "Good Friday Music".

== Memoration on Wednesday of the Holy Week ==
Some Baptist congregations, the Philadelphia Church of God, and some non-denominational churches oppose the observance of Good Friday, regarding it as a so-called "papist" tradition, and instead observe the Crucifixion of Jesus on Wednesday to coincide with the Jewish sacrifice of the Passover Lamb (which some/many Christians believe is an Old Testament pointer to Jesus Christ). A Wednesday Crucifixion of Jesus allows for him to be in the tomb ("heart of the earth") for three days and three nights as he told the Pharisees he would be (Matthew 12:40), rather than two nights and a day (by inclusive counting, as was the norm at that time) if he had died on a Friday.

However, the Associates for Biblical Research, in support of the traditional Christian observance of Good Friday, state that the Wednesday crucifixion theory contradicts the Jewish way of numbering days, as well as the locution of "three days and three nights" as a Jewish idiom.

== See also ==
- Good Friday Prayer
- Good Friday Prayer for the Jews
- Easter season
- Passion (music)
- Ascension of Jesus
- Life of Jesus in the New Testament
- Salvation in Christianity
