= Lenten supper =

Christian meal

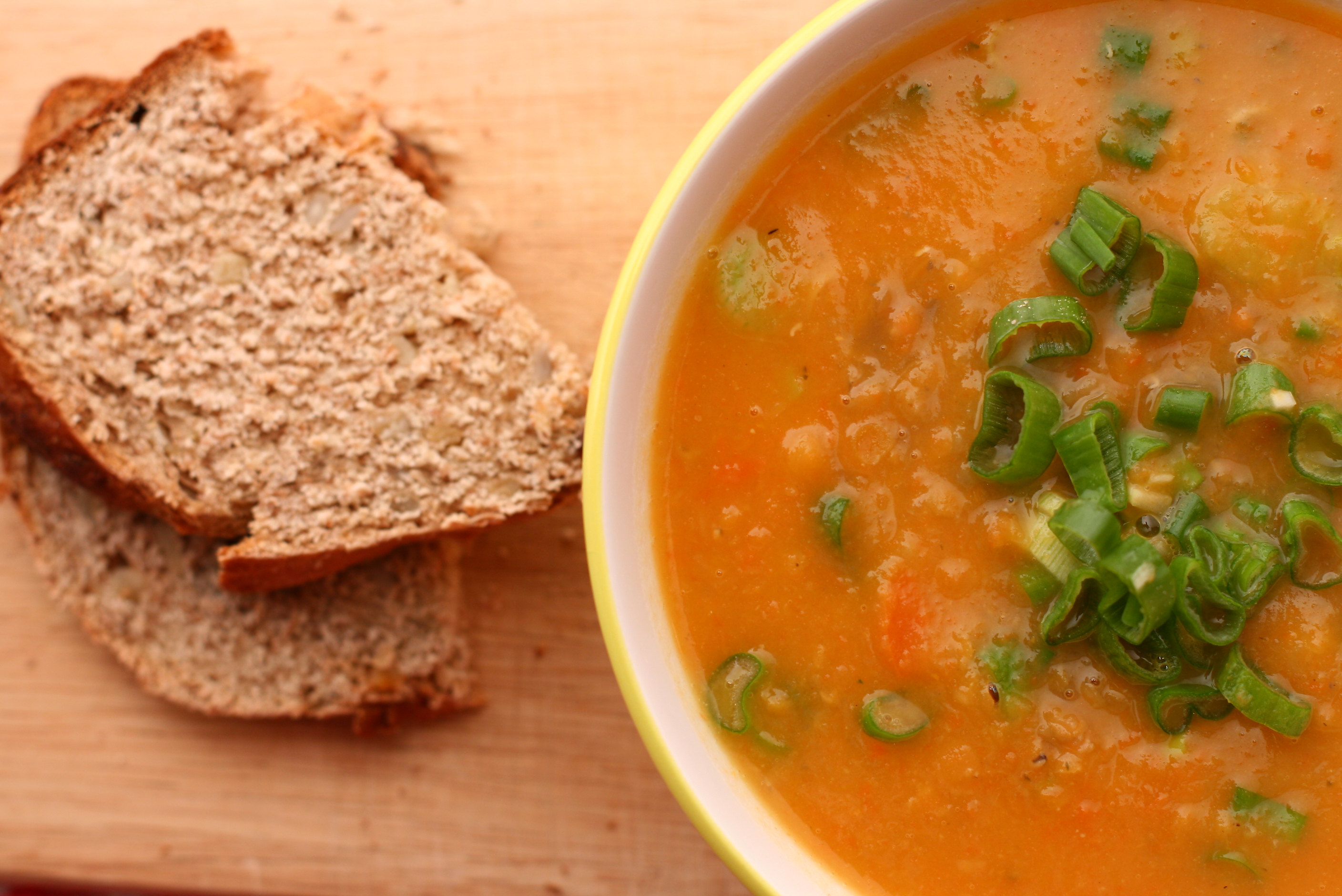
Lenten suppers often consist of a vegetarian soup, bread and water in order to maintain the season's focus on abstinence, sacrifice and simplicity.

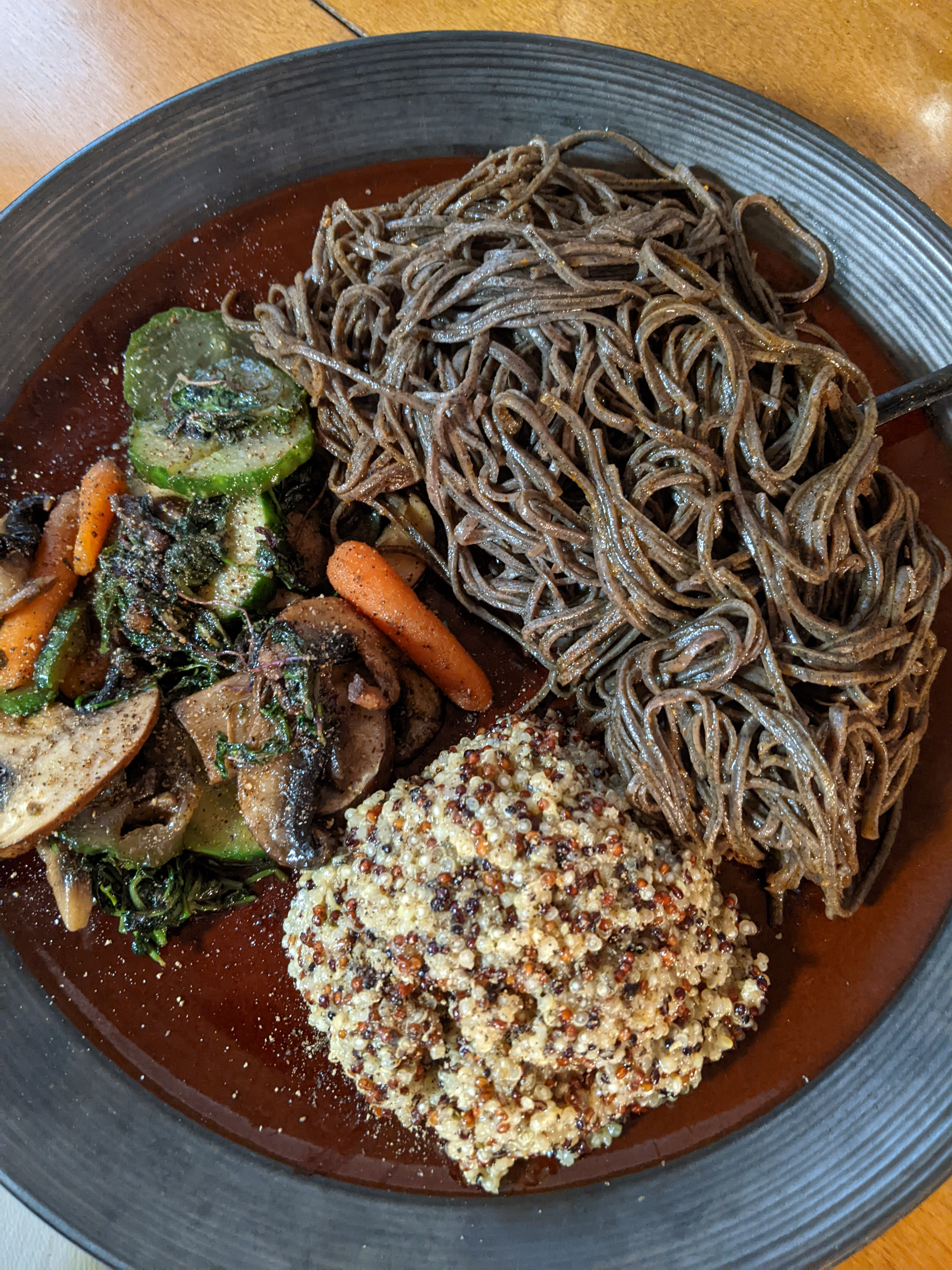
A Lenten supper prepared according to the diet specified in the Daniel Fast: this particular meal includes black bean spaghetti, quinoa, and mixed vegetables composed of cucumbers, mushrooms, microgreens, arugula, and baby carrots.

A Lenten supper is a meal that takes place in the evenings to break the day's fast during the Christian liturgical season of Lent, which is widely observed by members of the Catholic, Lutheran, Moravian, Anglican, Methodist, and United Protestant traditions, in addition to certain Reformed denominations. During Great Lent, Oriental Orthodox Christians and Eastern Orthodox Christians, as well as Christians belonging to the Church of the East, consume Lenten suppers in the evening, typically after sunset.

== History ==
The origin of the Lenten supper lies in the early Church, when Christians would fast from food and water until sunset and then consume a Lenten supper once sundown occurred. The Apostolic Constitutions only allowed for "bread, vegetables, salt and water" in the Lenten supper, with meat, lacticinia, and alcohol being forbidden. For the final week of Lent—Holy Week—only bread and salt was permitted by the Canons of Hippolytus for the Lenten supper. The post-Nicene church father John Chrysostom recorded that "no flesh was eaten during the whole of Lent."

== Practice ==
Lenten suppers occur daily from Mondays through Saturdays at sunset during the Lenten season in the context of Christian family life (if that family is observing all forty days of Lent through fasting); in a communal context, they are often held on Wednesdays (though they can be held any day[s] on Monday through Saturday) on which Christians of various denominations often attend a service of worship and then break that day's Lenten fast together through a community Lenten supper. The traditional Black Fast of Lent is kept by not eating during the day and then breaking the fast after sunset; the Eucharistic Fast enjoins fasting before the reception of Holy Communion, with the duration of this fast depending on the denomination. (Note: Christians do not fast on the first day of the week, the Lord's Day (Sunday), because this day honours the resurrection of Jesus.)

Lenten suppers are often held in the church's parish hall in the public setting and in the context of a family meal in the home setting. A Mealtime Prayer is always offered before Christians partake in the Lenten supper. When they are held on Fridays, often following the Stations of the Cross devotion, they often take the form of a fish fry given that many Christians (especially Catholics, Lutherans, Methodists and Anglicans) practice abstinence from meat on Fridays. Given the Lenten focus on sacrifice, abstinence and plainness, Lenten suppers are simple, having foods like vegetarian soup (such as carrot soup), bread and water, with no desserts (as many people practice vegetarianism and teetotalism as a Lenten sacrifice).

Christians of various traditions, who have voluntarily undertaken the Daniel Fast during the season of Lent, would consume Lenten suppers made from vegetables, fruits, lentils, beans, seeds and nuts, with meat, lacticinia and wine being excluded (cf. Daniel 10:3). A basket for alms is often kept in the parish hall and Christians who are participating in the Lenten supper contribute to it; these alms are then given to the poor, as almsgiving is one of the three pillars of Lent. In some communities, Lenten suppers are an expression of Christian ecumenism, with Wednesday Lenten services that are followed by Lenten suppers being held at a different denomination's local church each week of Lent (e.g. Catholic, Moravian, Lutheran, Anglican, Methodist and Reformed). Christians have also invited non-Christians to Lenten suppers to allow them to learn more about Christianity and to build bridges with other faith communities.

== See also ==
- Christian dietary laws
- Lenten daily devotional
- Agapefeast
