= Ambigu (meal) =

Ambigu is a French term meaning a type of meal service that was popular in the upper class circles of France and Britain during the second half of the 17th Century and 18th Century.

It originated from the needs of high society to provide an elegant but informal format for entertaining large numbers of people. This kind of meal, the ambigu or collation (at a collation, a term used in French courts of the early modern period, all the food was cold, whereas an ambigu might include hot dishes) was served late in the day, during the usual hours for dinner and supper.

The ambigu involved the simultaneous presentation of all the courses including the dessert. Although an ambigu could be served to guests seated at a table, in the style of a dinner party, it was typically presented as a buffet, often in bite-sized portions. It could be served in the main salon of the house, the terrace or garden, and in a grotto surrounded by fountains.

An aspect that made the ambigu so popular was its ability to incorporate musical performances, dances, or other forms of entertainment without the rigid formality and hierarchy of a traditional banquet.

This made it ideal for fêtes at Versailles becoming increasingly famous and popular during the early years of Louis XIV's reign.
