= Friday fast =

Christian practice of abstaining from meat, lacticinia and alcohol on Fridays

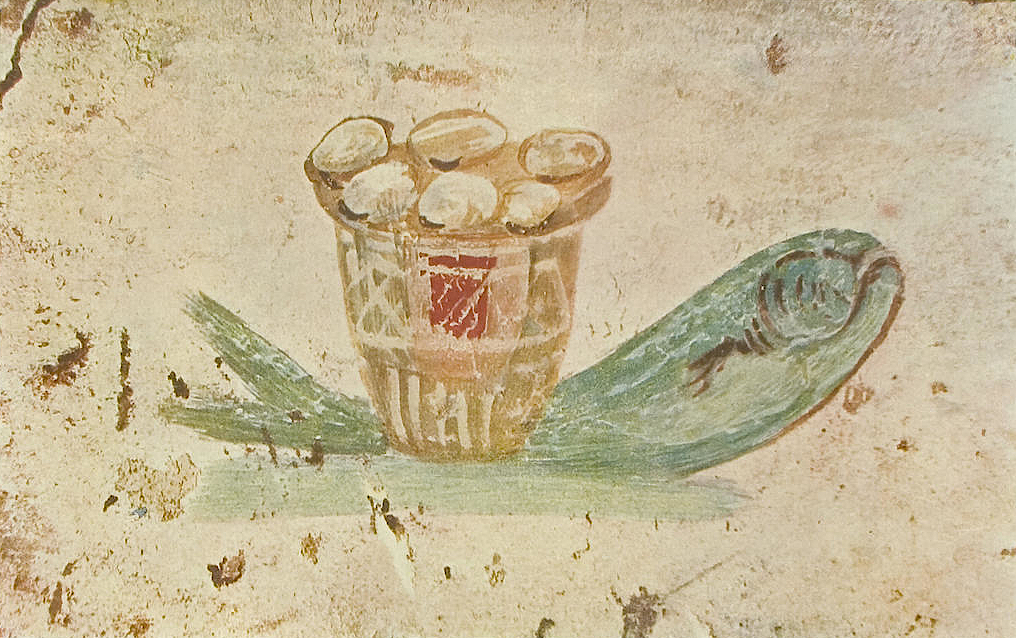
Depiction of bread and fish in the Crypt of Lucina

The Friday fast is a Christian practice of variously (depending on the denomination) abstaining from meat, dairy products, oil or wine on Fridays or holding a fast on Fridays, which is found most frequently in the Eastern Orthodox, Oriental Orthodox, Catholic, Lutheran, Anglican and Methodist traditions.

The Teaching of the Twelve Apostles, written in the first century A.D., directed Christians to fast on both Wednesdays (the fourth day of the week) and Fridays (the sixth day of the week). The Wednesday fast is done in remembrance of the story of the betrayal of Christ by Judas on Spy Wednesday, while the Friday fast is done in commemoration of the crucifixion of Jesus Christ on Good Friday. As such, all Fridays of the year have been historically kept in many parts of Christendom as a day of strict fasting and abstinence from alcohol, meat and lacticinia (milk and milk products). Abstinence from meat on Fridays is done as a sacrifice by many Christians because they believe that on Good Friday, Jesus sacrificed his flesh for humanity. In the Eastern Orthodox Church, in addition to fasting from food until sundown, the faithful are enjoined to abstain from sexual relations on Fridays as well.

== In Christianity ==
=== In Orthodoxy ===
According to Nicodemus the Hagiorite, Orthodox Christians are required to fast on Wednesdays and Fridays, which to eat but once a day, in the afternoon, without consuming oil or wine. The Wednesday fast is observed because on this day the council of the Jews was gathered to betray Jesus Christ; the Friday fast because on this day he suffered death. The supper that is eaten after the fast is broken in the evening is usually vegan.

=== In Catholicism ===
In Catholicism, specific regulations are passed by individual episcopates. In the United States in 1966, the Conference of Catholic Bishops passed Norms II and IV that bound all persons from age fourteen to abstain from meat on Fridays of Lent and through the year. Previously, the requirement to abstain from meat on all Fridays of the year applied for those age seven or older. Canons 1252 and 1253 of the 1983 Code of Canon Law express this same rule, and added that Bishops may permit substitution of other penitential practices for Fridays outside of Lent, but that some form of penance shall be observed on all Fridays of the year in commemoration of the day of the week of the Lord's Crucifixion. Abstinence on all Fridays outside of Lent is still the preferred practice among many Catholics, who choose to maintain this tradition rather than substituting an alternative penance. Most Episcopal Conferences have not allowed the substitution of an alternative penance for Fridays of Lent. No Episcopal Conference has lifted the obligation for either fasting or abstinence for Ash Wednesday and Good Friday.

Fast and abstinence is regulated by Canons 1250–1253 of the 1983 Code of Canon Law. They specify that all Fridays throughout the year and the time of Lent are penitential times throughout the entire church. All adults (those who have attained the "age of majority", which is 18 years in canon law) are bound by ecclesiastical law to fast on Ash Wednesday and Good Friday until the beginning of their sixtieth year. All persons who have completed their fourteenth year are bound by the law of abstinence on all Fridays unless the Friday is a solemnity and again on Ash Wednesday; but, in practice, this requirement has been greatly reduced by the Episcopal Conferences because under Canon 1253, it is these Conferences that have the authority to set down the local norms for fasting and abstinence in their territories. The precept to both fast and abstain on Ash Wednesday and Good Friday is usually not dispensed from.

Catholics may eat only one full meal on a fast day. Additionally, they are permitted to eat up to two small meals or snacks, known as collations. Church requirements on fasting only relate to solid food, not to drink, so church law does not restrict the amount of water or other beverages, even alcoholic drinks, which may be consumed. Church law on fasting has changed over the centuries since fasting is a discipline which may be altered by legitimate church authorities.

=== In Lutheranism ===
The Evangelical Lutheran Church of America states the following principles for fasting during Lent:

1. Fast on Ash Wednesday and Good Friday with only one simple meal during the day, usually without meat.
2. Refrain from eating meat (bloody foods) on all Fridays in Lent, substituting fish for example.
3. Eliminate a food or food group for the entire season. Especially consider saving rich and fatty foods for Easter.
4. Consider not eating before receiving Communion in Lent.
5. Abstain from or limit a favorite activity (television, movies, etc.) for the entire season, and spend more time in prayer, Bible study, and reading devotional material.

It is the practice of many Lutherans to abstain from alcohol and meat on the Fridays of Lent; a Black Fast has been historically kept by Lutherans on Good Friday.

=== In Anglicanism ===
The Book of Common Prayer of the Church of England designates "All the Fridays in the Year, except Christmas Day" as "days of fasting or abstinence", alongside the forty days of Lent, the Ember Days, the Rogation Days, and the vigils of the most prominent feast days.

The 1928 Book of Common Prayer of the Protestant Episcopal Church in the United States of America describes "All the Fridays in the Year, except Christmas Day and the Epiphany, or any Friday which may intervene between these Feasts" as days "on which the church requires such a measure of abstinence as is more especially suited to extraordinary acts and exercises of devotion".

=== In Methodism ===
The Methodist churches traditionally encourage their adherents to fast on Fridays throughout the year. The General Rules written by the founder of Methodism, John Wesley, state: "It is expected of all who desire to continue in these societies that they should continue to evidence their desire of salvation, by attending upon all the ordinances of God, such are: the public worship of God; the ministry of the Word, either read or expounded; the Supper of the Lord; family and private prayer; searching the Scriptures; and fasting or abstinence." A principal Methodist liturgical book The Sunday Service of the Methodists (put together by Wesley), as well as the Directions Given to Band Societies (25 December 1744), mandate fasting and abstinence from meat on all Fridays of the year (except Christmas Day, if it falls on a Friday), a practice that was reemphasized by Phoebe Palmer and became standard in the Methodist churches of the holiness movement.

Wesley required fasting on both Wednesdays (in remembrance of the Betrayal of Christ) and Fridays (in remembrance of His crucifixion and death) for those seeking ordination.

== See also ==
- Christian vegetarianism
- Eucharistic fast
- Lenten sacrifice
- Meat-free day
- Sunday Sabbatarianism
