= Lenten sacrifice =

Sacrifices during the season Lent

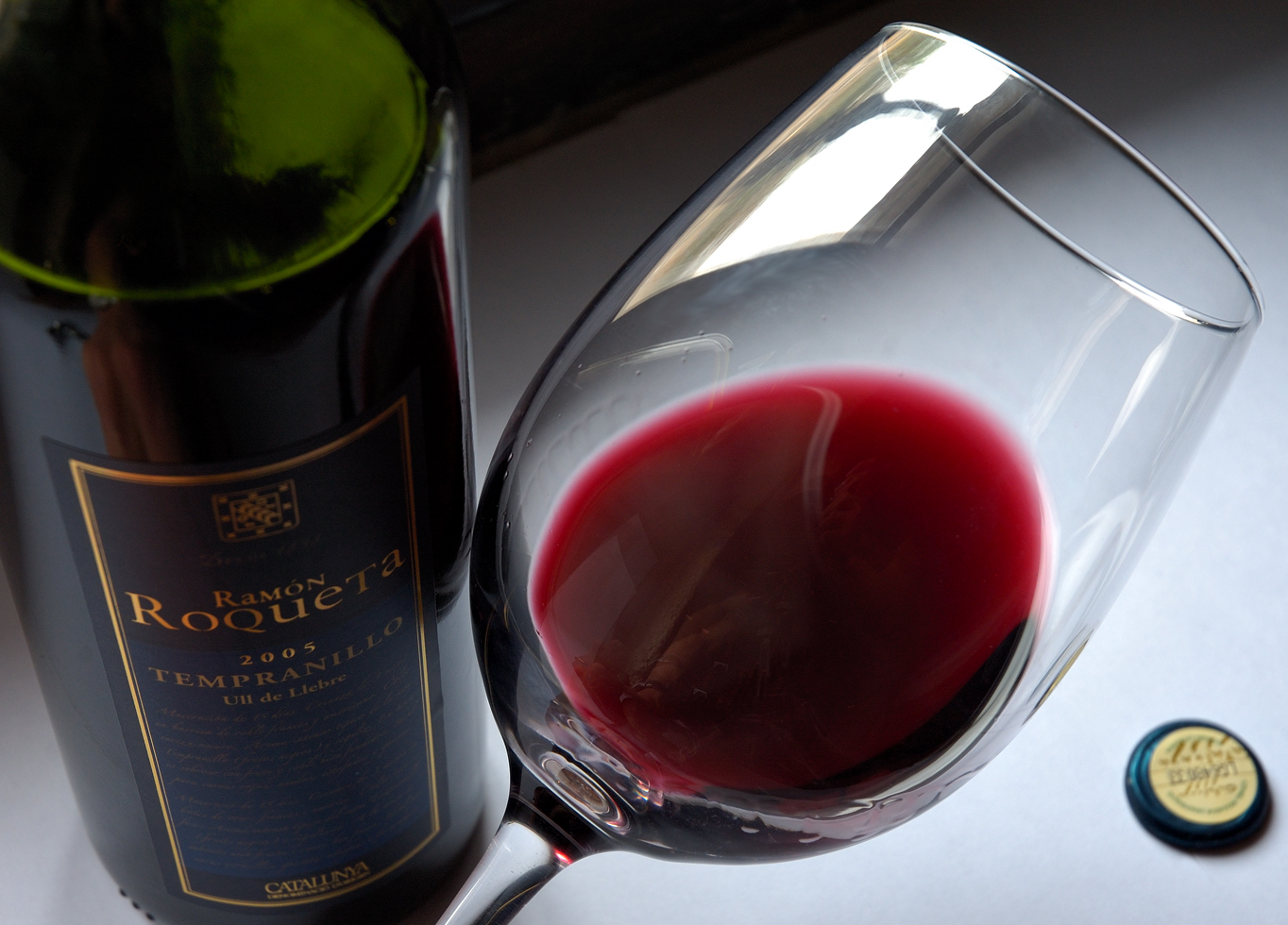
Many Christians choose to practice teetotalism during Lent, thus giving up alcoholic beverages during the liturgical season.

A Lenten sacrifice is a spiritual practice where Christians, particularly Catholics, Lutherans, Anglicans, Methodists, Moravians and the United Protestants voluntarily renounce a pleasure or luxury during the observance of Lent, which begins on Ash Wednesday. The tradition of Lent has its roots in Jesus Christ praying and fasting for forty days in the desert according to the gospels of Matthew, Mark and Luke. When Lent is over and Easter Sunday arrives, the faithful are able to indulge in what they sacrificed during the Lenten season.

== Examples of Lenten sacrifices ==
Common Lenten sacrifices include abstaining from pleasures such as chocolate, sugar, sweets, or soft drinks. Some Christians choose to practice temperance throughout the Lenten season, thus giving up alcoholic beverages; in light of this, temperance drinks experience a surge of popularity during the Lenten season. Others, on the first day of Lent, pledge to give up sinful behaviours, such as using profanity, and hope to permanently rid themselves of these habits even after the arrival of Eastertide. While making a Lenten sacrifice, it is customary for Christians to pray for strength to keep it; many often wish others for doing so as well, e.g. "May God bless your Lenten sacrifice."

Many Christians sacrifice the eating of meat and commit to vegetarianism for the entire Lenten season. It is commonplace for many Christians (especially Roman Catholics, Lutherans, Anglicans, and Methodists) to observe the Friday Fast throughout Lent, which includes abstaining from meat on the Fridays of Lent.

Some Christian clergy, both Roman Catholic and Methodist, have encouraged the faithful not to give up social media for Lent as they believe that Christians can use social media for evangelism.

== Spiritual and charitable acts ==
Prayer, fasting and almsgiving are the three pillars of Lent, with Lent-observing Christians striving to practice these throughout the Lenten season. Christian denominations often set certain requirements for the practice of fasting, such as those found in Pope Paul VI's apostolic constitution Paenitemini in the Catholic Church, A Handbook for the Discipline of Lent in Lutheranism, the Book of Common Prayer in Anglicanism, and The Sunday Service of the Methodists. The faithful are encouraged to practice prayer more intensively and to take part more in church services and devotions (e.g. the Way of the Cross). Likewise, they engage in works of mercy and give alms, along with participating in other means of grace. The Lenten sacrifice is related to these three pillars of Lent. The money an individual would normally spend on rich foods, such as sweets or soft drinks, is donated as alms for the poor (cf. offering). The giving away of one's own money as alms for the needy can itself be considered a Lenten sacrifice. In addition to making their Lenten sacrifice, many Christians choose to add a Lenten spiritual discipline, such as reading a daily devotional or praying through a Lenten calendar, to draw themselves nearer to God. Traditionally, the Lenten sacrifice is maintained from Ash Wednesday through Holy Saturday with the Sundays of Lent being included; historically, fasting and abstinence were enjoined during the weekdays of Lent, with Sundays being days of abstinence.

== See also ==
- Black Fast – Ancient form of Christian fasting
- Christian Vegetarian Association – Christian organization promoting vegetarianism
- Pioneer Total Abstinence Association – Organisation of Roman Catholic teetotallers
- Fasting and abstinence in the Catholic Church
- Fasting in religion – Religious practice
