= Lent =

Christian observance before Easter

Lent; Quadragesima
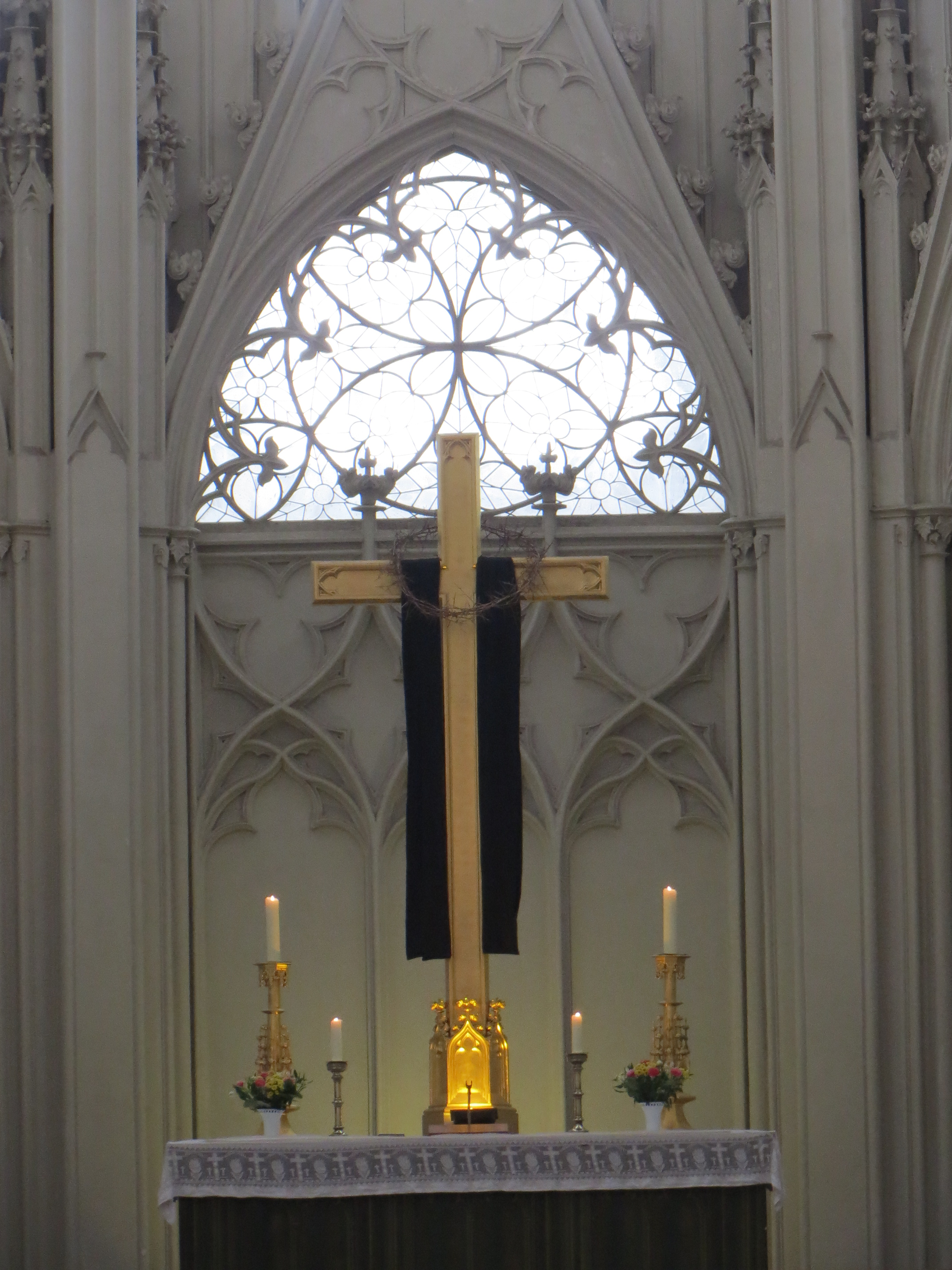
- High altar, barren, with few adornments, as is custom during Lent
- Type: Christian
- Celebrations: Omission of Gloria and Alleluia; Veiling of religious images
- Observances: Fasting; Praying; Alms giving; Abstinence
- Begins: On Ash Wednesday (Western); On Clean Monday (Eastern)
- Ends: On Maundy Thursday (Latin Catholic); On Holy Saturday (Lutheran, Moravian, Anglican, and Western Orthodox); On the Friday before Lazarus Saturday (Eastern); On Easter
- Date: Variable (follows the paschal computus, and depends on denomination)
- 2025 date: 5 March – 17 April or 19 April (Western); 3 March – 11 April (Eastern)
- 2026 date: 18 February – 2 April or 4 April (Western); 23 February – 3 April (Eastern)
- 2027 date: 10 February – 25 March or 27 March (Western); 15 March – 23 April (Eastern)
- 2028 date: 1 March – 13 April or 15 April (Western); 28 February – 7 April (Eastern)
- Frequency: Annual (lunar calendar)
- Related to: Shrovetide, Exodus, Temptation of Christ, Eastertide

Lent (Latin: Quadragesima, 'Fortieth') is the solemn Christian religious observance in the liturgical year in preparation for Easter. It echoes the 40 days Jesus spent fasting in the desert and enduring temptation by Satan, according to the Gospels of Matthew, Mark and Luke, before beginning his public ministry. Lent is usually observed in the Catholic, Lutheran, Moravian, Anglican, United Protestant and Orthodox Christian traditions, among others. A number of Anabaptist, Baptist, Methodist, Reformed (including certain Continental Reformed, Presbyterian and Congregationalist churches), and nondenominational Christian churches also observe Lent, although many churches in these traditions do not.

Which days are enumerated as being part of Lent differs between Christian denominations (see below), although in all of them Lent is described as lasting for a total duration of 40 days, the number of days Jesus, as well as Moses and Elijah, went without food in their respective fasts. In Lent-observing Western Christian denominations, Lent begins on Ash Wednesday and ends approximately six weeks later; depending on the Christian denomination and local custom, Lent concludes either on the evening of Maundy Thursday (Holy Thursday), or at sundown on Holy Saturday when the Easter Vigil is celebrated, though in either case, Lenten fasting observances are maintained until the evening of Holy Saturday. Being the Lord's Day, the Sundays of Lent are not regarded as days of fasting, though historically, abstinence from meat was enjoined on the Sundays of Lent (as with the other days of the Lenten season). In Eastern Christianity – including Eastern Orthodox, Eastern Catholics, Eastern Lutherans, and Oriental Orthodox – Great Lent is observed continuously without interruption for 40 days starting on Clean Monday and ending on Lazarus Saturday before Holy Week.

Lent is a period of penitence, which ends at the arrival of Easter. The purpose of Lent is the preparation of the believer for Easter through prayer, fasting, and almsgiving (the three pillars of Lent), as well as mortifying the flesh, repentance of sins, simple living, and self-denial. In Lent, many Christians commit to fasting, as well as giving up certain luxuries in imitation of Christ's sacrifice during his journey into the desert for 40 days; this is known as one's Lenten sacrifice. Prior to the 6th century, Lent was normatively observed through the practice of the Black Fast, which enjoins fasting from food and liquids, with the allowance of one vegetarian meal after sunset. This form of fasting continues in certain denominations, such as the Coptic Orthodox Church. Many Lent-observing Christians also add a Lenten spiritual discipline, such as reading a daily devotional or praying through a Lenten calendar, to draw themselves near to God. Among Christians of the Roman Catholic, Evangelical Lutheran and Anglican denominations, the Stations of the Cross are a devotion observed during Lent, especially on Fridays, in remembrance of the Via Dolorosa of Jesus.

In most Lent-observing denominations, the last week of Lent is known as Holy Week, which begins with Palm Sunday. Following the New Testament narrative, Jesus' crucifixion is commemorated on Good Friday, and at the beginning of the next week the joyful celebration of Easter, the start of the Easter season, which recalls the resurrection of Jesus. In some Christian denominations, Maundy Thursday, Good Friday, and Holy Saturday form the Easter Triduum. The viewing of and participation in Passion Plays occurs during Lent, especially during Holy Week, which are often interdenominational productions.

== Etymology ==
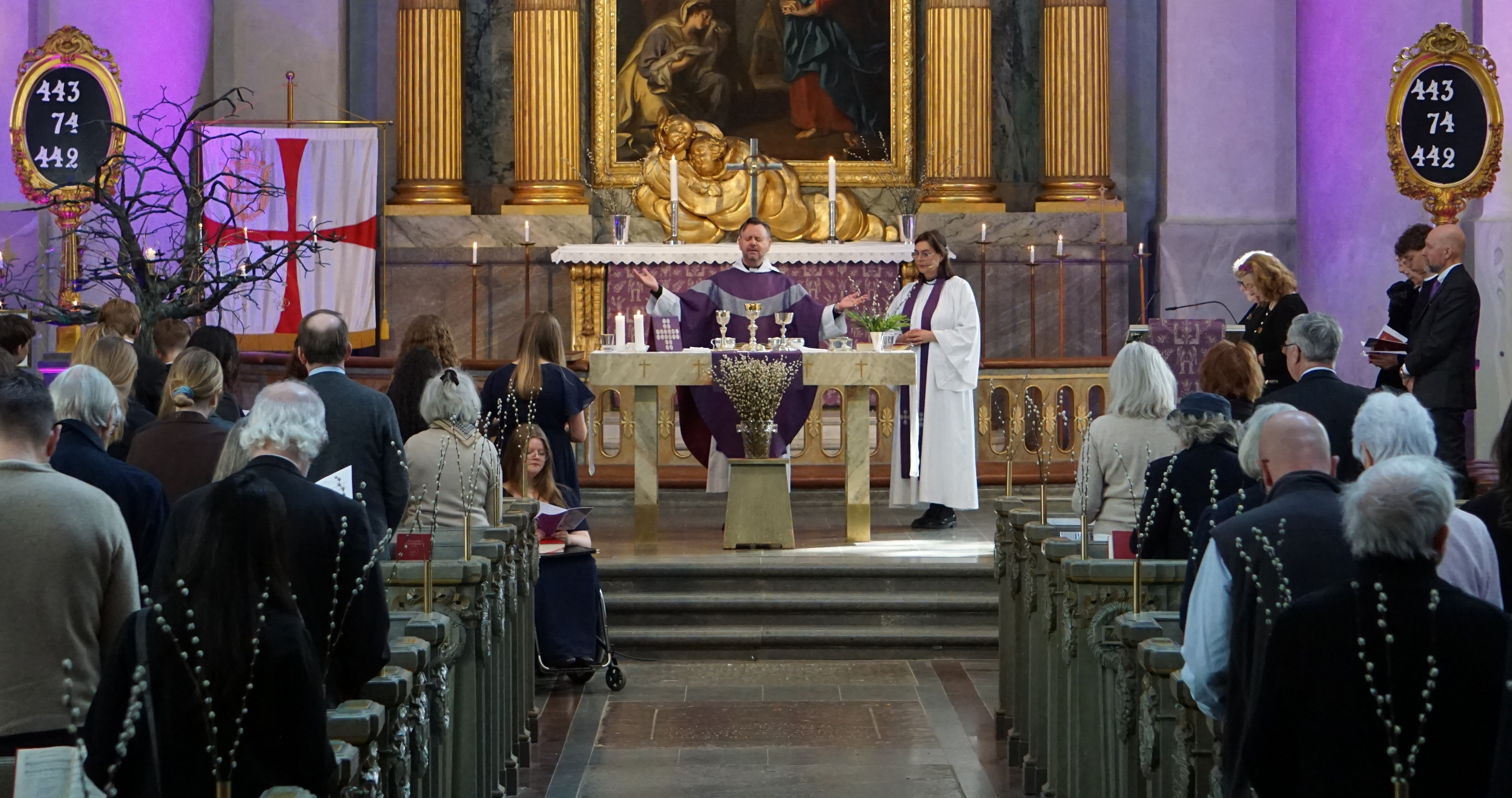
An Evangelical-Lutheran Mass at Hedvig Eleonora Church on the sixth Sunday of Lent. Purple is the liturgical colour of the Lenten season.

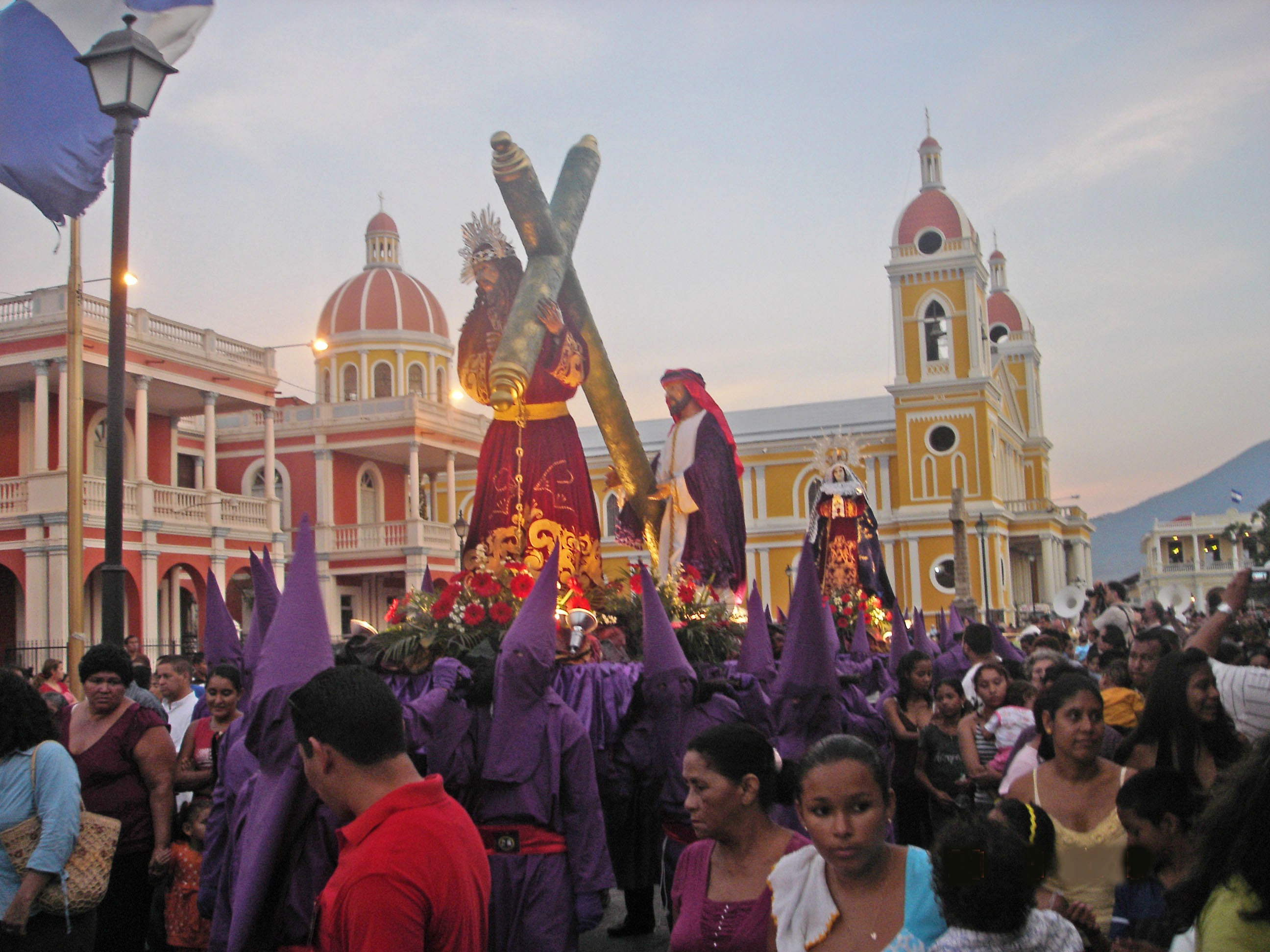
Lent observers, including a confraternity of penitents, carrying out a street procession during Holy Week, in Granada, Nicaragua. The violet colour is often associated with penance and detachment. Similar Christian penitential practice is seen in other Christian countries, sometimes associated with fasting.

The English word Lent is a shortened form of the Old English word lencten, meaning "spring season", as its Dutch language cognate lente (Old Dutch lentin) still does today. A dated term in German, Lenz (Old High German lenzo), is also related. According to the Oxford English Dictionary, 'the shorter form (? Old Germanic type *laŋgito-, *laŋgiton-) seems to be a derivative of *laŋgo- long [...] and may possibly have reference to the lengthening of the days as characterizing the season of spring'. The origin of the -en element is less clear: it may simply be a suffix, or lencten may originally have been a compound of *laŋgo- 'long' and an otherwise little-attested word *-tino, meaning "day".

In languages spoken where Christianity was earlier established, such as Greek and Latin, the term signifies the period dating from the 40th weekday before Easter. In modern Greek the term is Σαρακοστή (Sarakostí), derived from the earlier Τεσσαρακοστή (Tessarakostí), meaning "fortieth". The corresponding word in Latin, quadragesima ("fortieth"), is the origin of the terms used in Latin-derived languages and in some others.

Examples in the Romance language group are: Catalan quaresma, French carême, Galician coresma, Italian quaresima, Occitan quaresma, Portuguese quaresma, Romanian păresimi, Sardinian caresima, Spanish cuaresma, and Walloon cwareme. Examples in non-Latin-based languages are: Albanian kreshma, Basque garizuma, Croatian korizma, Irish and Scottish Gaelic carghas, Swahili kwaresima, Filipino kuwaresma, and Welsh c(a)rawys.

In other languages, the name used refers to the activity associated with the season. Thus it is called "fasting period" in Czech (postní doba), German (Fastenzeit), and Norwegian (fasten/fastetid), and it is called "The Great Fast" in Arabic (الصوم الكبير – al-ṣawm al-kabīr), Syriac (ܨܘܡܐ ܪܒܐ ṣawmā rabbā), Polish (wielki post), Russian (великий пост – vieliki post), Ukrainian (великий піст – velyky pist), and Hungarian (nagyböjt). Romanian, apart from a version based on the Latin term referring to the 40 days (see above), also has a "great fast" version: postul mare. Dutch has three options, one of which means fasting period, and the other two referring to the 40-day period indicated in the Latin term: vastentijd, veertigdagentijd and quadragesima, respectively. In India, it is called चरम चालीसा (Charam Chalisa - meaning, "climax forty"). In Maltese, despite being a descendant of Arabic, the term Randan is used, which is distinctive when compared to the dialects of Arabic. Despite the centuries of Catholic influences, the term remains unchanged since the Arab occupation of Malta.

== Origin ==
The pattern of fasting and praying for 40 days is seen in the Christian Bible, on which basis the liturgical season of Lent was established. In the Old Testament, the prophet Moses went into the mountains for 40 days and 40 nights to pray and fast "without eating bread or drinking water" before receiving the Ten Commandments (cf. Exodus 34:28). Likewise, the prophet Elijah went into the mountains for 40 days and nights to fast and pray "until he reached Horeb, the mountain of God" when "the word of the Lord came to him" (cf. 1 Kings 19:8–9). The early Christian bishop Maximus of Turin wrote that as Elijah by "fasting continuously for a period of forty days and forty nights ... merited to extinguish the prolonged and severe dryness of the whole world, doing so with a stream of rain and steeping the earth's dryness with the bounty of water from heaven", in the Christian tradition, this is interpreted as being "a figure of ourselves so that we, also fasting a total of forty days, might merit the spiritual rain of baptism ... [and] a shower from heaven might pour down upon the dry earth of the whole world, and the abundant waters of the saving bath might saturate the lengthy drought of the Gentiles." In the New Testament, Jesus went into the desert to fast and pray for 40 days and 40 nights; it was during this time that Satan tried to tempt him (cf. Matthew 4:1–3). The 40-day and night fasts of Moses, Elijah, and Jesus prepared them for their work.

Early Christianity records the tradition of fasting before Easter. For the meal of the day consumed after sunset (when the fast is broken), the Apostolic Constitutions permit the consumption of "bread, vegetables, salt and water, in Lent" with "flesh and wine being forbidden." The Canons of Hippolytus authorize only bread and salt to be consumed during Holy Week. The practice of fasting and abstaining from alcohol, meat and lacticinia during Lent thus became established in the Church.

In AD 339, Athanasius of Alexandria wrote that the Lenten fast was a 40-day fast that "the entire world" observed. Saint Augustine of Hippo (AD 354–430) wrote that: "Our fast at any other time is voluntary; but during Lent, we sin if we do not fast." Church Father John Chrysostom (AD 347–407) stated that the early Christians did not consume meat for the whole duration of Lent.

Three main prevailing theories exist on the finalization of Lent as a 40-day fast prior to the arrival of Easter Sunday: First, that it was created at the Council of Nicea in 325 and there is no earlier incarnation. Second, that it is based on an Egyptian Christian post-theophany fast. Third, a combination of origins syncretized around the Council of Nicea. There are early references to periods of fasting prior to baptism. For instance, the Didache, a 1st or 2nd-century Christian text, commends "the baptizer, the one to be baptized, and any others that are able" to fast to prepare for the sacrament.

For centuries it has been common practice for baptisms to take place on Easter, and so such references were formerly taken to be references to a pre-Easter fast. Tertullian, in his 3rd-century work On Baptism, indicates that Easter was a "most solemn day for baptism." However, he is one of only a handful of writers in the ante-Nicene period who indicate this preference, and even he says that Easter was by no means the only favoured day for baptisms in his locale.

Since the 20th century, scholars have acknowledged that Easter was not the standard day for baptisms in the early church, and references to pre-baptismal periods of fasting were not necessarily connected with Easter. There were shorter periods of fasting observed in the pre-Nicene church (Athanasius noted that the 4th-century Alexandrian church observed a period of fasting before Pascha [Easter]). However it is known that the 40-day period of fasting – the season later named Lent – before Eastertide was clarified at the Nicene Council. In 363–64 AD, the Council of Laodicea prescribed the Lenten fast as "of strict necessity".

== Date and duration ==
Some named days and day ranges around Lent and Easter in Western Christianity, with the fasting days of Lent numbered

The 40 days of Lent are calculated differently among the various Christian denominations that observe it, depending on how the date of Easter is calculated, but also on which days Lent is understood to begin and end, and on whether all the days of Lent are counted consecutively. Additionally, the date of Lent may depend on the calendar used by the particular church, such as the (revised) Julian or Gregorian calendars typically used by Catholic, Eastern Orthodox, and Protestant churches, or the Ethiopian and Coptic calendars traditionally used by some Oriental Orthodox churches.

=== Roman Catholic Church ===
Since 1970, in the Roman Rite Lent starts on Ash Wednesday and ends on the evening of Holy Thursday with the Mass of the Lord's Supper. This comprises a period of 44 days. Historically, both the fasting and abstinence were required during the weekdays of Lent and with Sundays solely being days of abstinence; the obligations of the Lenten fast continue through Good Friday and Holy Saturday, totaling 40 days (with the Eucharistic Fast applying as well). Although Lent formally ends on Holy Thursday, Lenten fasting practices continue until the Easter Vigil and additionally, the celebration of Easter is preceded by the Paschal fast.

In the Ambrosian Rite, Lent begins on the Sunday that follows what is celebrated as Ash Wednesday in the rest of the Latin Catholic Church, and ends as in the Roman Rite, thus being of 40 days, counting the Sundays but not Holy Thursday. The day for beginning the Lenten fast in the Ambrosian Rite is the Monday after Ash Wednesday. The special Ash Wednesday fast is transferred to the first Friday of the Ambrosian Lent. Until this rite was revised by Saint Charles Borromeo, the liturgy of the First Sunday of Lent was festive, celebrated in white vestments with chanting of the Gloria in Excelsis and Alleluia, in line with the recommendation in Matthew 6:16, "When you fast, do not look gloomy."

During Lent, the Church discourages marriages, but couples may marry if they forgo the special blessings of the Nuptial Mass and limit social celebrations.

In the Catholic Church, the Second Vatican Council directed that twofold character of Lent was to be "brought into greater prominence both in the liturgy and by liturgical catechesis": Lent is a season for "recalling or preparing for baptism" and for penance, which "disposes the faithful, who more diligently hear the word of God and devote themselves to prayer, to celebrate the paschal mystery".

The period of Lent observed in the Eastern Catholic Churches corresponds to that in other churches of Eastern Christianity that have similar traditions.

=== Protestantism and Western Orthodoxy ===
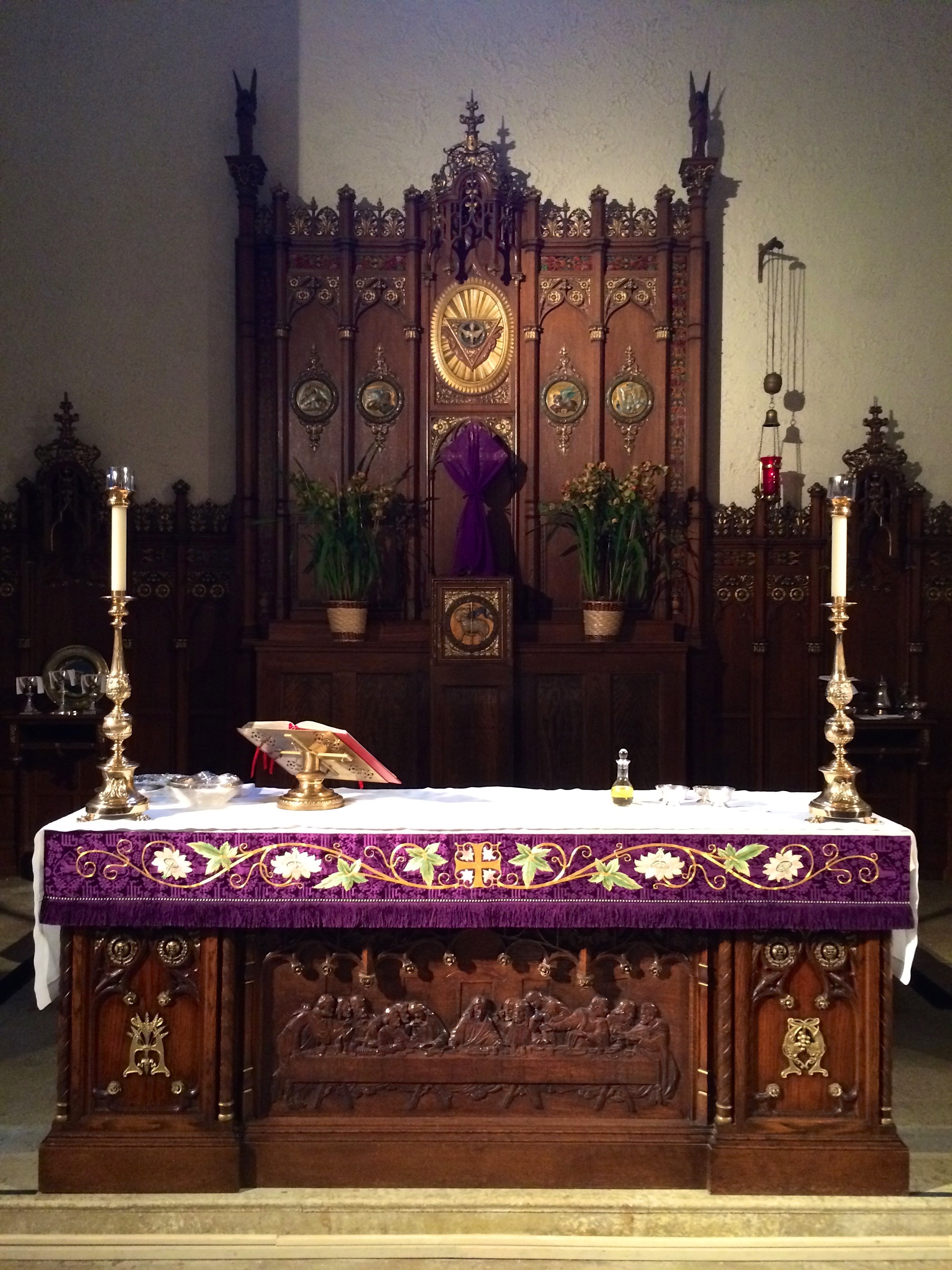
In Western traditions, the liturgical colour of the season of Lent is violet. Altar crosses and religious statuary which show Christ in his glory are traditionally veiled during this period in the Christian year.

In Protestant and Western Orthodox Churches that celebrate it, the season of Lent lasts from Ash Wednesday to the evening of Holy Saturday. This calculation makes Lent last 46 days if the 6 Sundays are included, but only 40 days if they are excluded. This definition is still that of the Moravian Church, Lutheran Church, Anglican Church, Methodist Church, Western Rite Orthodox Church, United Protestant Churches, and those of the Reformed Churches (i.e., Continental Reformed, Presbyterian, and Congregationalist) that observe Lent. (In the Episcopal Church, the main U.S. branch of the Anglican Communion, the 1979 Book of Common Prayer identifies Holy Week—comprising Palm/Passion Sunday through Holy Saturday—as a separate season after Lent; but the Days of Special Devotion, to be observed by special acts of discipline and self-denial, include the weekdays of, but not the Sundays in, both Lent and Holy Week, so the practical effect is the same as the traditional 40-day calculation.)

=== Eastern Orthodoxy and Byzantine Rite ===
In the Byzantine Rite, i.e., the Eastern Orthodox Great Lent (Greek: Μεγάλη Τεσσαρακοστή or Μεγάλη Νηστεία, meaning "Great 40 Days" and "Great Fast" respectively) is the most important fasting season in the church year. In Eastern Orthodox circles, the season of Lent is known as "bright sadness" (Greek: χαρμολύπη, romanized: charmolypê).

The 40 days of Great Lent include Sundays, and begin on Clean Monday. The 40 days are immediately followed by what are considered distinct periods of fasting, Lazarus Saturday and Palm Sunday, which in turn are followed straightway by Holy Week. Great Lent is broken only after the Paschal (Easter) Divine Liturgy.

The Eastern Orthodox Church maintains the traditional Church's teaching on fasting. The rules for lenten fasting are the monastic rules. Fasting in the Orthodox Church is more than simply abstaining from certain foods. During the Great Lent Orthodox Faithful intensify their prayers and spiritual exercises, go to church services more often, study the Scriptures and the works of the Church Fathers in depth, limit their entertainment and spending and focus on charity and good works.

Some other churches that follow the Byzantine Rite, including certain Eastern Catholic and Eastern Lutheran denominations have similar practices as those of Eastern Orthodoxy.

=== Oriental Orthodoxy ===
Among the Oriental Orthodox, there are various local traditions regarding Lent. Those using the Alexandrian Rite, i.e., the Coptic Orthodox, Coptic Catholic, Ethiopian Orthodox, Ethiopian Catholic, Eritrean Orthodox, and Eritrean Catholic Churches, observe eight continuous weeks of fasting constituting three distinct consecutive fasting periods:

1. a Pre-Lenten fast in preparation for Great Lent
2. Great Lent itself
3. the Paschal fast during Holy Week which immediately follows Lent

As in the Eastern Orthodox Churches, the date of Easter is typically reckoned according to the Julian calendar, and usually occurs later than Easter according to Gregorian calendar used by Catholic and Protestant Churches.

=== Ethiopian Orthodoxy ===
In Ethiopian Orthodoxy, fasting (tsome) lasts for 55 continuous days before Easter (Fasika), although the fast is divided into three separate periods: Tsome Hirkal, the eight-day Fast of Heraclius, commemorating the fast requested by the Byzantine Emperor Heraclius before he reputedly set out to fight the Sassanian Empire and recover the True Cross which had been seized and taken from Jerusalem; Tsome Arba, 40 days of Lent; and Tsome Himamat, seven days commemorating Holy Week. Fasting involves abstention from animal products (meat, dairy, and eggs), and refraining from eating or drinking before 3:00 pm. Ethiopian devotees may also abstain from sexual activity and the consumption of alcohol.

=== Quartodecimanism ===
Quartodeciman Christians ended the fast of Lent on the Paschal full moon of the Hebrew calendar, in order to celebrate the Feast of Unleavened Bread beginning on the 14th of Nisan, whence the name derives. For this practice, they were excommunicated in the Easter controversy of the 2nd century A.D.

== Associated customs ==
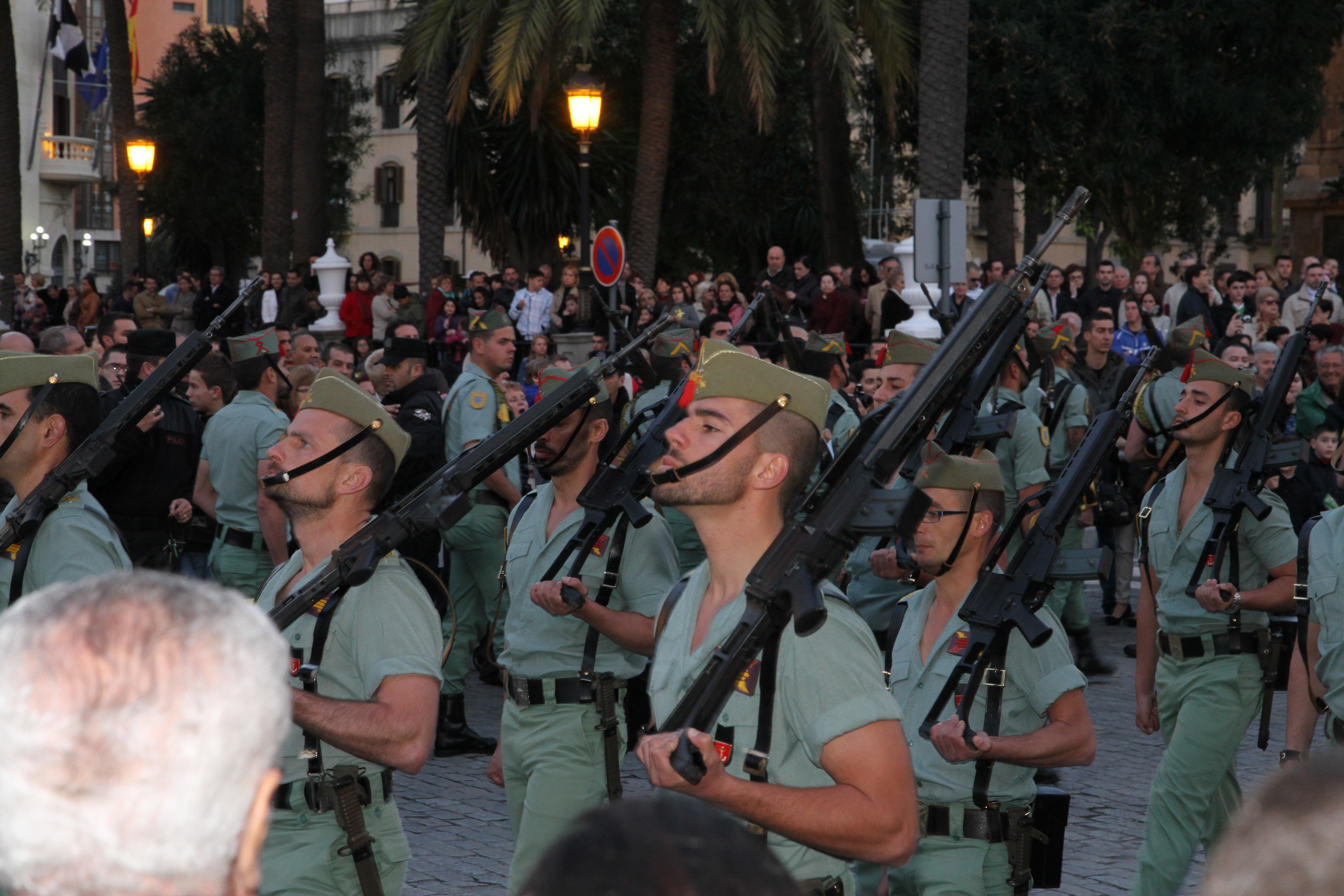
In many Christian countries, religious processions during the season of Lent are often accompanied by a military escort both for security and parade (Ceuta, Spain).

Three traditional practices are to be taken up with renewed vigour during Lent; these are known as the three pillars of Lent:

1. prayer (justice toward God)
2. fasting (justice toward self)
3. almsgiving (justice toward neighbours)

Self-reflection, simplicity, and sincerity are emphasised during the Lenten season.

Often observed (especially on Fridays) in churches of the Roman Catholic, Lutheran and Anglican denominations are the Stations of the Cross, a devotional commemoration of Christ's carrying the Cross and crucifixion. During Lent, churches remove flowers from their chancels and veil crucifixes, statues that show the triumphant Christ, and other elaborate religious symbols in violet fabrics. The custom of veiling is typically practised the last two weeks of Lent, beginning on the fifth Sunday of Lent (known as Judica Sunday or Passion Sunday) until Good Friday. During the Good Friday liturgy of the Catholic and Lutheran traditions, a wooden cross is venerated. The same cross is often decorated with flowers on Easter Sunday.

=== Pre-Lenten observances ===
During pre-Lent, it is customary for Christians to ponder what Lenten sacrifices they will make for Lent.

The pre-Lenten period concludes with the opportunity for a last round of merrymaking, known as Carnival, Shrovetide, or Fastelavn, before the start of the sombre Lenten season. The traditions of carrying Shrovetide rods and consuming Shrovetide buns after attending church are celebrated.

On the final day of the season, Shrove Tuesday or Mardi Gras, many traditional Christians, such as Catholics, Evangelical-Lutherans and Anglicans, among others "make a special point of self-examination, of considering what wrongs they need to repent, and what amendments of life or areas of spiritual growth they especially need to ask God's help in dealing with." As such, many churches (particularly those of the Catholic and Lutheran traditions) offer the sacrament of Confession on Shrove Tuesday. During Shrovetide, many churches place a basket in the narthex to collect the previous year's Holy Week palm branches that were blessed and distributed during the Palm Sunday liturgies; on Shrove Tuesday, churches burn these palms to make the ashes used during the services held on the very next day, Ash Wednesday.

In historically Lutheran nations, Shrovetide is known as Fastelavn. After attending the Mass on Shrove Sunday, congregants enjoy Shrovetide buns (fastelavnsboller), "round sweet buns that are covered with icing and filled with cream and/or jam." Children often dress up and collect money from people while singing. They also practise the tradition of hitting a barrel, which represents fighting Satan; after doing this, children enjoy the sweets inside the barrel. Lutheran Christians in these nations carry Shrovetide rods (fastelavnsris), which "branches decorated with sweets, little presents, etc., that are used to decorate the home or give to children."

In English-speaking countries such as the United Kingdom and Canada, the day before Lent is known as Shrove Tuesday, which is derived from the word shrive, meaning "to administer the sacrament of confession to; to absolve." In these countries, pancakes are associated with Shrove Tuesday because they are a way to use up rich foods such as eggs, milk, and sugar – rich foods which are not eaten during the season.

The Carnival celebrations which in many cultures traditionally precede Lent are seen as a last opportunity for excess before Lent begins. Some of the most famous are the Carnival of Barranquilla, the Carnival of Santa Cruz de Tenerife, the Carnival of Venice, Cologne Carnival, the New Orleans Mardi Gras, the Rio de Janeiro carnival, and the Trinidad and Tobago Carnival.

In stark contrast to traditions of merrymaking and feasting, Oriental Orthodox Churches practise a pre-Lenten fast in preparation for Lent which is immediately followed by the fast of Great Lent without interruption. One example is the traditional Assyrian festival of Hano Qritho, in which a feast is prepared from bulgur, meat and eggs before the start of fasting.

=== Fasting and Lenten sacrifice ===
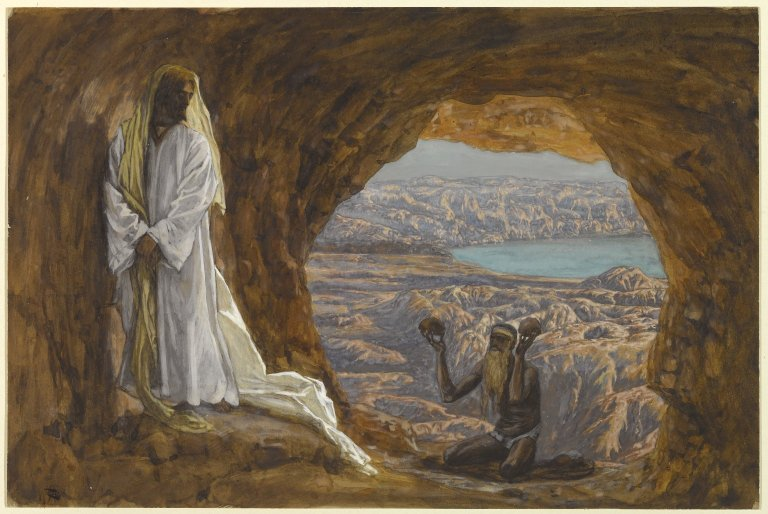
Jesus Tempted in the Wilderness (Jésus tenté dans le désert), James Tissot, Brooklyn Museum

There are traditionally 40 days in Lent; these are marked by fasting, both from foods and festivities, and by other acts of penance. Fasting is maintained for all 40 days of Lent (regardless of how they are enumerated; see above). Historically, fasting and abstinence have been maintained continuously for the weekdays of the whole Lenten season, with Sundays being days of abstinence only. The making of a Lenten sacrifice, in which Christians give up a personal pleasure for the duration of 40 days, is a traditional practice during Lent.

During Shrovetide and especially on Shrove Tuesday, the day before the start of the Lenten season, many Christians finalize their decision with respect to what Lenten sacrifices they will make for Lent. Examples include practising vegetarianism and teetotalism during Lent as a Lenten sacrifice. While making a Lenten sacrifice, it is customary to pray for strength to keep it; many often wish others for doing so as well, e.g. "May God bless your Lenten sacrifice." In addition, some believers add a regular spiritual discipline, to bring them closer to God, such as reading a Lenten daily devotional.

For Catholics, Lutherans, Moravians, Anglicans, United Protestants, and Lent-observing Methodists and Reformed Christians, the Lenten penitential season ends after the Easter Vigil Mass or Sunrise service. Orthodox Christians also break their fast after the Paschal Vigil, a service which starts around 11:00 pm on Holy Saturday, and which includes the Paschal celebration of the Divine Liturgy of St. John Chrysostom. At the end of the service, the priest blesses cheese, eggs, flesh meats, and other items that the faithful have been abstaining from for the duration of Great Lent.

Lenten traditions and liturgical practices are less common, less binding, and sometimes non-existent among some liberal and progressive Christians. A greater emphasis on the anticipation of Easter Sunday is often encouraged more than the penitence of Lent or Holy Week.

Some Christians as well as secular groups also interpret the Lenten fast in a positive tone, not as renunciation but as contributing to causes such as environmental stewardship and improvement of health. Even some atheists find value in the Christian tradition and observe Lent.

==== Lenten Black Fast ====
Historically, using the early Christian form known as the Black Fast, the observant does not consume food for a whole day until the evening, and at sunset, Christians traditionally break the Lenten fast of that day with a vegetarian supper (no food or drink is consumed in a day apart from that in the Lenten supper). In India and Pakistan, many Christians continue this practice of fasting until sunset on Ash Wednesday and Good Friday, with many fasting in this manner throughout the whole season of Lent.

==== Daniel Fast ====
Christians of various traditions, including Catholics and Methodists, have voluntarily undertaken the Daniel Fast during the season of Lent, in which one abstains from "meat, fish, egg, dairy products, chocolates, ice creams, sugar, sweets, wine or any alcoholic beverages" (cf. Daniel 10:3).

==== Lenten supper ====
After attending a worship service (often on Wednesday and Friday evenings), it is common for Christians of various denominations to conclude that day's Lenten fast together through a communal Lenten supper, which may be held in the church's parish hall. Lenten suppers ordinarily take place in the home setting during the 40 days of Lent during which a family (or individual) concludes that day's fast after a mealtime prayer.

==== Abstinence from meat and animal products ====
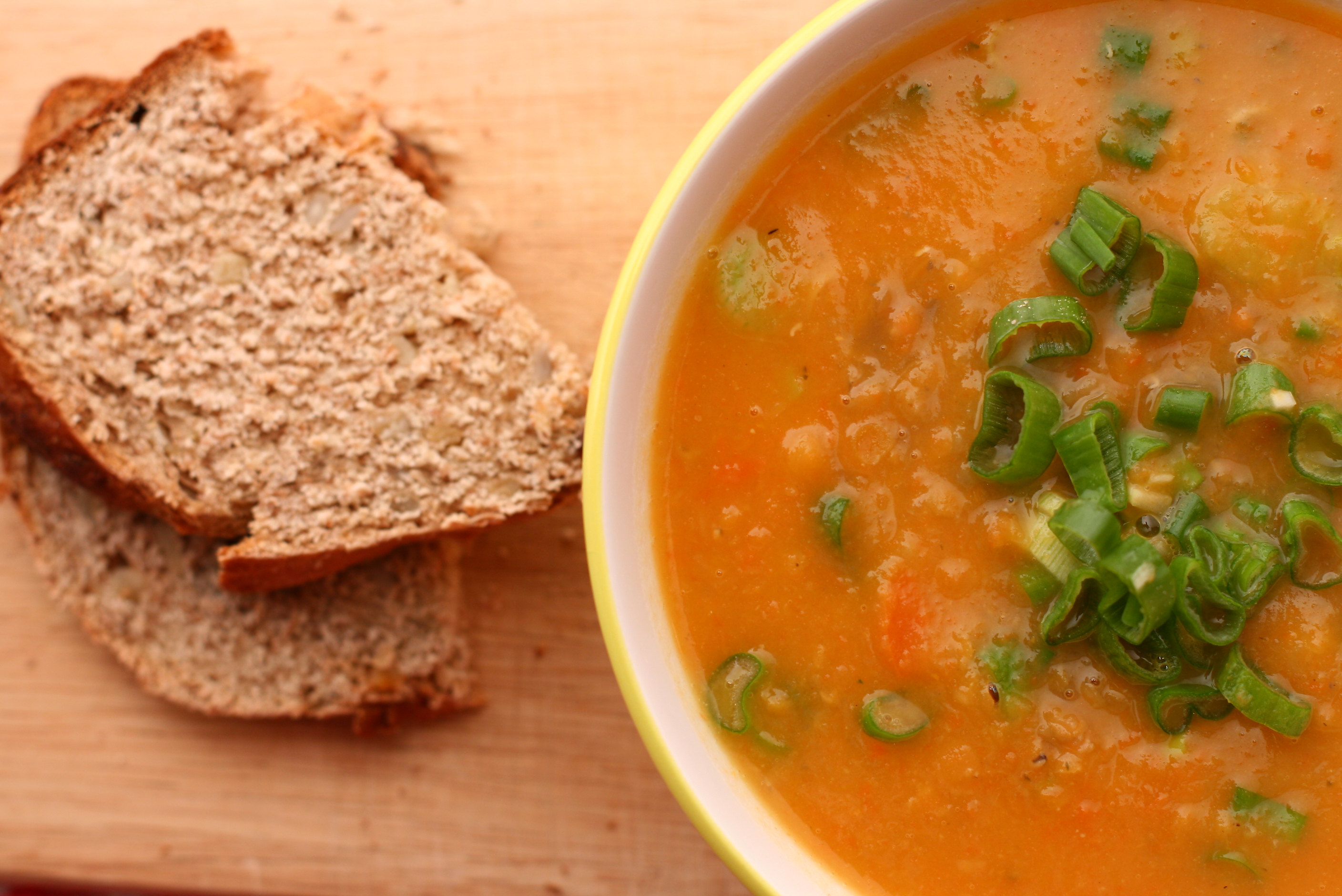
Lenten suppers often consist of a vegetarian soup, bread, and water in order to maintain the season's focus on abstinence, sacrifice, and simplicity.

Fasting has historically included abstinence from alcohol, meat, lacticinia (dairy products), and other edible produce derived from animals (such as eggs), which has been enjoined continuously for the whole duration of the season including Sundays. Church Father John Chrysostom stated that the early Christians did not consume meat for the whole duration of Lent. Throughout Christendom, some adherents continue to mark the season with a traditional abstention from the consumption of meat (vegetarianism), most notably among Catholics, Lutherans, and Anglicans. The form of abstention may vary depending on what is customary; some abstain from meat for 40 days, some do so only on Fridays, or some only on Good Friday itself.

In Catholicism, lacticinia may be consumed by penitents in Spain and its colonised territories, per a pontifical decree of Pope Alexander VI. Until 1741, meat and lacticinia were otherwise forbidden for the whole season of Lent, including Sundays. In that year, Pope Benedict XIV allowed for the consumption of meat and lacticinia during certain fasting days of Lent.

Abstinence from alcohol during the season of Lent has traditionally been enjoined "in remembrance of the Sacred Thirst of Our Lord on the Cross."

Dispensations for the allowance of certain foods have been given throughout history, depending on the climate in that part of the world. For example, Giraldus Cambrensis, in his Itinerary of Archbishop Baldwin through Wales, reports that "in Germany and the arctic regions", "great and religious persons" eat the tail of beavers as "fish" because of its superficial resemblance to "both the taste and colour of fish." The animal was very abundant in Wales at the time. Saint Thomas Aquinas allowed for the consumption of sweetened foods during Lent, because "sugared spices", such as comfits, were, in his opinion, digestive aids on par with medicine rather than food.

Fasting practices are considerably relaxed in Western societies today, though in the Eastern Orthodox, Oriental Orthodox, Eastern Catholic, and Eastern Lutheran Churches abstinence from all animal products including eggs, fish, fowl, and milk is still commonly practised, so that, where this is observed, only vegetarian (or vegan) meals are consumed for the whole of Lent, 48 days in the Byzantine Rite. The Ethiopian Orthodox Church's practices require a fasting period that is a great deal longer, and there is some dispute over whether fish consumption is permissible.

In the traditions of Lent-observing Western Churches, abstinence from eating some form of food (generally meat, but not dairy or fish products) is distinguished from fasting. In principle, abstinence is to be observed in Western Christianity on Ash Wednesday and on every Friday of the year that is not a solemnity (a liturgical feast day of the highest rank); but in each country the episcopal conference can determine the form it is to take, perhaps replacing abstinence with other forms of penance.

==== Sexual abstinence ====
The Coptic Orthodox Church, a denomination of Oriental Orthodox Christianity, teaches that during Lent believers "should refrain from physical relations to give themselves time for fasting and prayer (1 Corinthians 7:5)." Also, the Eastern Orthodox Church enjoins abstinence from sexual relations during Lent.

In Western Christianity, through the Middle Ages, Christians abstained from sexual relations during the whole of Lent. In view of this, nine months after Lent, birth records were drastically low. In Spain, according to researchers from the University of Valencia and the University of Alcalà, the custom of abstaining from sexual relations was widely practised until the end of the Franco régime, though some Western Christians voluntarily continue this practice today.

=== Specific fasting traditions by Christian denomination ===
==== Catholicism ====
Prior to 1966, the Catholic Church allowed Catholics of fasting age to eat only one full meal a day, generally at noon, throughout all forty days of Lent, except on the Lord's Day. Catholics were allowed to take a smaller meal in the evening, called a collation, which was introduced after the 14th century A.D., and a cup of some beverage such as tea, coffee, or diluted chocolate, accompanied by a bite of bread or a cracker, in the morning. Liquids including soda, beer, and wine were allowed as drinks at any time, except milk or broth, which were considered to be food. The 1917 Code of Canon Law allowed the full meal on a fasting day to be taken at any hour and to be supplemented by two collations, with the quantity and the quality of the food to be determined by local custom. Abstinence from meat was to be observed on Ash Wednesday and on Fridays and Saturdays in Lent.

The Lenten fast ended on Holy Saturday at noon. Only those aged 21 to 59 were obliged to fast. As with all ecclesiastical laws, particular difficulties, such as strenuous work or illness, excused one from observance, and a dispensation from the law could be granted by a bishop or parish priest. A rule of thumb is that the two collations should not add up to the equivalent of another full meal. Rather portions were to be: "sufficient to sustain strength, but not sufficient to satisfy hunger."

In 1966, Pope Paul VI reduced the obligatory fasting days from all forty days of Lent to Ash Wednesday and Good Friday, abstinence days to Fridays and Ash Wednesday, and allowed episcopal conferences to replace abstinence and fasting with other forms of penitence such as charity and piety, as declared and established in his apostolic constitution Paenitemini; fasting on all forty days of Lent is still "strongly recommended", though not under pain of mortal sin. This was done so that those in countries where the standard of living is lower can replace fasting with prayer, but "where economic well-being is greater, so much more will the witness of asceticism have to be given".

This was made part of the 1983 Code of Canon Law, which made obligatory fasting for those aged between 18 and 59, and abstinence for those aged 14 and upward. The Irish Catholic Bishops' Conference decided to allow other forms of Friday penance to replace that of abstinence from meat, whether in Lent or outside Lent, suggesting alternatives such as abstaining from some other food, or from alcohol or smoking; making a special effort at participating in family prayer or in Mass; making the Stations of the Cross; or helping the poor, sick, old, or lonely.

The Catholic Bishops' Conference of England and Wales made a similar ruling in 1985 but decided in 2011 to restore the traditional year-round Friday abstinence from meat. The United States Conference of Catholic Bishops has maintained the rule of abstention from meat on Friday only during Lent and considers poultry to be a type of meat but not fish or shellfish.

The Congregation of Mary Immaculate Queen (CMRI), a Sedevacantist Catholic congregation, requires fasting for its members on all of the forty days of the Christian season of repentance, Lent (except on the Lord's Day). The CMRI mandates under the pain of grave sin, abstinence from meat on Ash Wednesday, Good Friday, Holy Saturday and all Fridays of the year in general.

Even during Lent, the rule about solemnities holds, so that the obligation of Friday abstinence does not apply on 19 and 25 March when, as usually happens, the solemnities of Saint Joseph and the Annunciation are celebrated on those dates. The same applies to Saint Patrick's Day, which is a solemnity in the whole of Ireland as well as in dioceses that have Saint Patrick as their principal patron saint. In some other places, too, where there are strong Irish traditions within the Catholic community, a dispensation is granted for that day. In Hong Kong, where Ash Wednesday often coincides with Chinese New Year celebrations, a dispensation is then granted from the laws of fast and abstinence, and the faithful are exhorted to use some other form of penance.

==== Lutheranism ====
Following the birth of Lutheranism in the Protestant Reformation, Lutheran church orders in the 16th century "retained the observation of the Lenten fast, and Lutherans have observed this season with a serene, earnest attitude." Many Lutheran churches advocate fasting during Lent, especially on Ash Wednesday and Good Friday. A Handbook for the Discipline of Lent published by the Evangelical Lutheran Church in America, a mainline Lutheran denomination, offers a number of guidelines for fasting, abstinence, and other forms of self-denial during Lent:

1. Fast on Ash Wednesday and Good Friday with only one simple meal during the day, usually without meat.
2. Refrain from eating meat (bloody foods) on all Fridays in Lent, substituting fish for example.
3. Eliminate a food or food group for the entire season. Especially consider saving rich and fatty foods for Easter.
4. Consider not eating before receiving Communion in Lent.
5. Abstain from or limit a favorite activity (television, movies etc.) for the entire season, and spend more time in prayer, Bible study, and reading devotional material.
6. Don't just give up something that you have to give up for your doctor or diet anyway. Make your fast a voluntary self-denial (i.e. discipline) that you offer to God in prayer.

The Lutheran Church–Missouri Synod, a confessional Lutheran denomination, likewise encourages (but does not require) members to give things up for Lent, while emphasizing that the purpose of Lent is repentance from sin rather than minor acts of self-denial in themselves.

==== Moravianism ====
Members of the Moravian Church voluntarily fast during the season of Lent, along with making a Lenten sacrifice for the season as a form of penitence.

==== Reformed ====
John Calvin, the principal figure in the development of Reformed theology, critiqued the practice of Lent in his Institutes of the Christian Religion as a "superstitious observance," and observed that "Christ did not fast repeatedly (which he must have done had he meant to lay down a law for an anniversary fast), but once only, when preparing for the promulgation of the gospel." Similarly, leading Reformed divines such as Samuel Rutherford rejected the obligation of Lent.

The Directory for Public Worship produced by the Westminster Assembly in 1644 and approved by the Scottish Parliament in 1645 takes the position that "[t]here is no day commanded in scripture to be kept holy under the gospel but the Lord's day, which is the Christian Sabbath," and approves of fasting specifically "upon special emergent occasions" (cf. days of humiliation and thanksgiving). Accordingly, and in keeping with the Reformed regulative principle of worship, the Reformed churches have historically not observed Lent.

Some churches in the Reformed tradition observe Lent today. For example, the Reformed Church in America, a Mainline Protestant denomination, describes the first day of Lent, Ash Wednesday, as a day "focused on prayer, fasting, and repentance," encouraging members to "observe a Holy Lent, by self-examination and penitence, by prayer and fasting, by practising works of love, and by reading and reflecting on God's Holy Word." Among Reformed Christians who do observe Lent, Good Friday, which is towards the end of the Lenten season, is an important day of communal fasting, as it is for many Episcopalians, Lutherans, and Methodists.

==== Anglicanism ====
The Book of Common Prayer (1662) of the Church of England designates "All the Fridays in the Year, except Christmas Day" as days of fasting and abstinence, alongside the forty days of Lent, the Ember Days, the Rogation Days, and the vigils of feast days. Saint Augustine's Prayer Book, a companion to the Book of Common Prayer, states that fasting is "usually meaning not more than a light breakfast, one full meal, and one half meal, on the forty days of Lent." It further states that "the major Fast Days of Ash Wednesday and Good Friday, as the American Prayer-Book indicates, are stricter in obligation, though not in observance, than the other Fast Days, and therefore should not be neglected except in cases of serious illness or other necessity of an absolute character."

==== Methodism ====
The historical Methodist homilies regarding the Sermon on the Mount stress the importance of the Lenten fast, which begins on Ash Wednesday. The United Methodist Church therefore states that:

There is a strong biblical base for fasting, particularly during the 40 days of Lent leading to the celebration of Easter. Jesus, as part of his spiritual preparation, went into the wilderness and fasted 40 days and 40 nights, according to the Gospels.

Good Friday, which is towards the end of the Lenten season, is traditionally an important day of communal fasting for Methodists. Rev. Jacqui King, the minister of Nu Faith Community United Methodist Church in Houston, explained the philosophy of fasting during Lent as "I'm not skipping a meal because in place of that meal I'm actually dining with God."

The United Methodist Church teaches, in reference to one's Lenten sacrifice, that "On each Lord's Day in Lent, while Lenten fasts continue, the reverent spirit of Lent is tempered with joyful anticipation of the Resurrection."

The liturgical book The Sunday Service of the Methodists (put together by John Wesley), as well as the Directions Given to Band Societies (25 December 1744), mandate fasting and abstinence from meat on all Fridays of the year (except Christmas Day, if it falls on a Friday).

=== Other related fasting periods ===
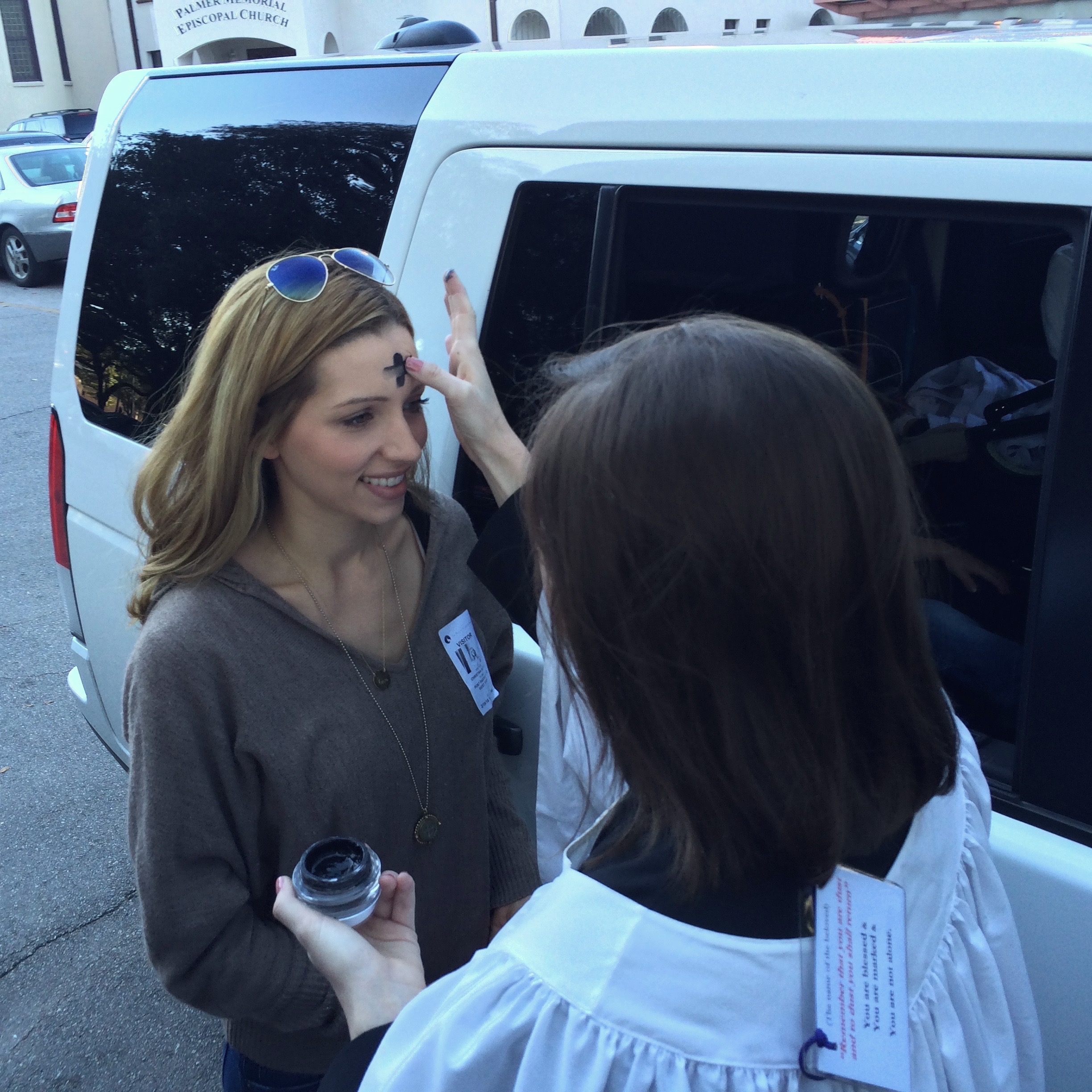
The season of Lent begins on Ash Wednesday, most notably by the public imposition of ashes. In this photograph, a woman receives a cross of ashes on Ash Wednesday outside an Anglican church.

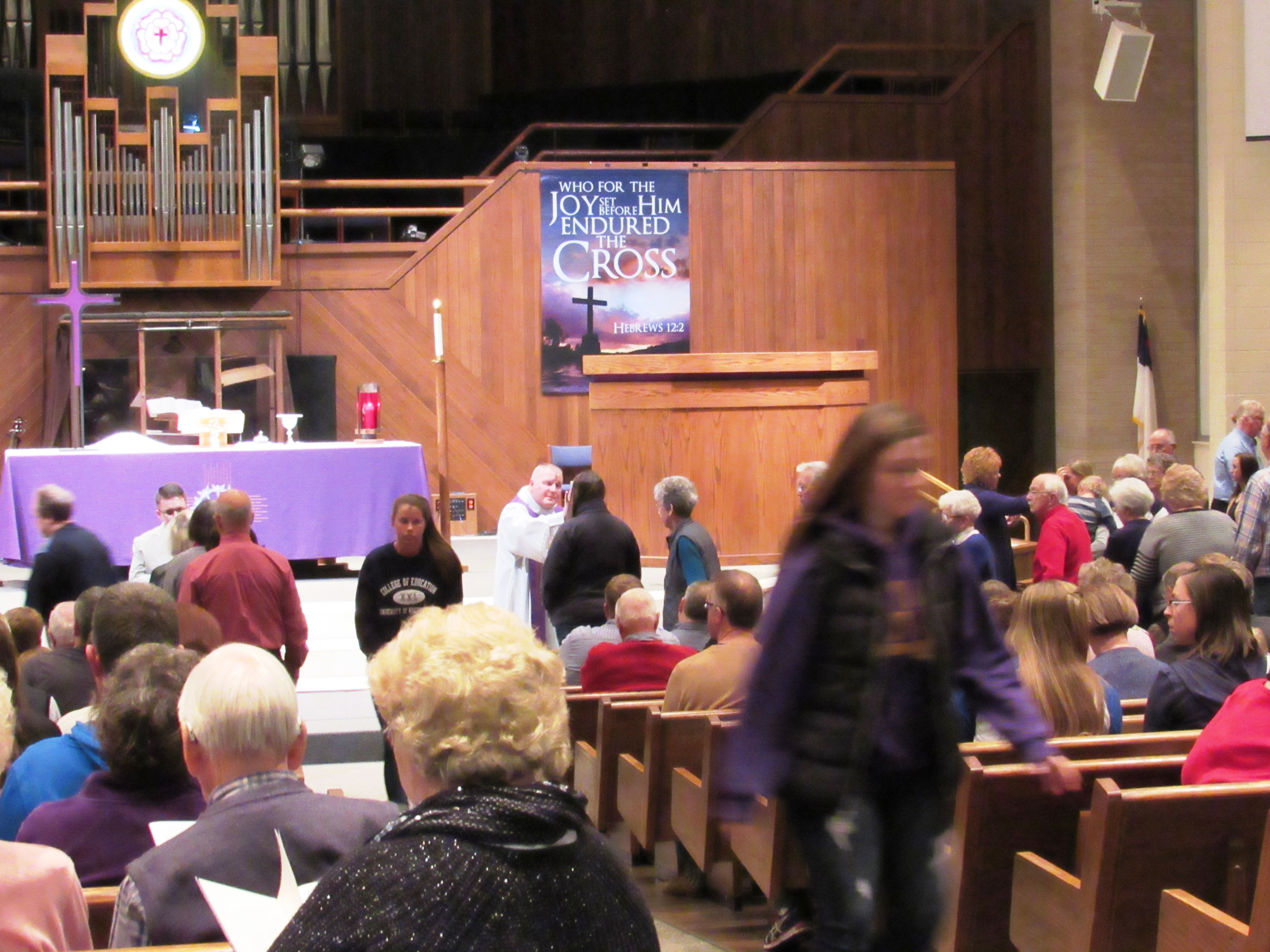
An Evangelical-Lutheran pastor distributes ashes during the celebration of Mass (Divine Service) on Ash Wednesday.

The number 40 has many Biblical references:

- Moses spent 40 days on Mount Sinai with God
- Elijah spent 40 days and nights walking to Mount Horeb
- God sent 40 days and nights of rain in the great flood of Noah
- The Hebrew people wandered 40 years in the desert while traveling to the Promised Land
- Jonah's prophecy of judgment gave 40 days to the city of Nineveh in which to repent or be destroyed
- Jesus retreated into the wilderness, where He fasted for 40 days, and was tempted by the devil. He overcame all three of Satan's temptations by citing scripture to the devil, at which point the devil left him, angels ministered to Jesus, and He began His ministry. Jesus further said that His disciples should fast "when the bridegroom shall be taken from them", a reference to his Passion.
- It is the traditional belief that Jesus lay for 40 hours in the tomb, which led to the 40 hours of total fasting that preceded the Easter celebration in the early Church (the biblical reference to 'three days in the tomb' is understood by them as spanning three days, from Friday afternoon to early Sunday morning, rather than three 24-hour periods of time). Some Christian denominations, such as The Way International and Logos Apostolic Church of God, as well as Anglican scholar E. W. Bullinger in The Companion Bible, believe Christ was in the grave for a total of 72 hours, reflecting the type of Jonah in the belly of the whale.

One of the most important ceremonies at Easter is the baptism of the initiates on Easter Eve. The fast was initially undertaken by the catechumens to prepare them for the reception of this sacrament. Later, the period of fasting from Good Friday until Easter Day was extended to six days, to correspond with the six weeks of training necessary to give the final instruction to those converts who were to be baptized.

Converts to Christianity followed a strict catechumenate or period of instruction and discipline prior to receiving the sacrament of baptism, sometimes lasting up to three years. In Jerusalem near the close of the fourth century, classes were held throughout Lent for three hours each day. With the legalization of Christianity (by the Edict of Milan) and its later imposition as the state religion of the Roman Empire, its character was endangered by the great influx of new members. In response, the Lenten fast and practices of self-renunciation were required annually of all Christians, both to show solidarity with the catechumens, and for their own spiritual benefit.

=== Almsgiving ===
Almsgiving is one of the three pillars of Lent. The money that would normally go towards a luxury (given up as a Lenten sacrifice during Lent), is donated at church as an offering towards helping the poor.

=== Prayer and devotion ===
A common practice is the singing of the Stabat Mater hymn in designated groups. Among Filipino Catholics, the recitation of the epic of Christ' passion, called Pasiong Mahal, is also observed. In many Christian countries, grand religious processions and cultural customs are observed, such as the Stations of the Cross. A custom of visiting seven churches during Holy Week to pray the Stations of the Cross and praying at each church, exists and has been done in an ecumenical context, involving Christians of the Catholic, Methodist, Episcopal and Salvationist traditions, among others.

==== Omission of Gloria and Alleluia ====
The Gloria in excelsis Deo, which is usually said or sung on Sundays at Mass (or Communion) of the Roman, Lutheran, Methodist, and Anglican rites, is omitted on the Sundays of Lent (as well as Sundays of Advent), but continues in use on solemnities and feasts and on special celebrations of a more solemn kind. Some Mass compositions were written especially for Lent, such as Michael Haydn's Missa tempore Quadragesimae, without Gloria, in D minor, and for modest forces, only choir and organ. The Gloria is used on Maundy Thursday, to the accompaniment of bells, which then fall silent until the Gloria in excelsis of the Easter Vigil.

The Lutheran Divine Service, the Roman Rite of the Catholic Church, the Anglican Churches, and the Presbyterian service of worship associate the Alleluia with joy and omit it entirely throughout Lent, not only at Mass but also in the canonical hours and outside the liturgy. The word "Alleluia" at the beginning and end of the Acclamation Before the Gospel at Mass is replaced by another phrase.

Before 1970, the omission began with Septuagesima, and the whole Acclamation was omitted and was replaced by a Tract; and in the Liturgy of the Hours the word "Alleluia", normally added to the Gloria Patri at the beginning of each Hour – now simply omitted during Lent – was replaced by the phrase Laus tibi, Domine, rex aeternae gloriae (Praise to you, O Lord, king of eternal glory).

Until the Ambrosian Rite was revised by Saint Charles Borromeo the liturgy of the First Sunday of Lent was festive, celebrated with chanting of the Gloria and Alleluia, in line with the recommendation in Matthew 6:16, "When you fast, do not look gloomy."

In the Byzantine Rite, the Gloria (Great Doxology) continues to be used in its normal place in the Matins service, and the Alleluia appears all the more frequently, replacing "God is the Lord" at Matins.

==== Veiling of religious images ====
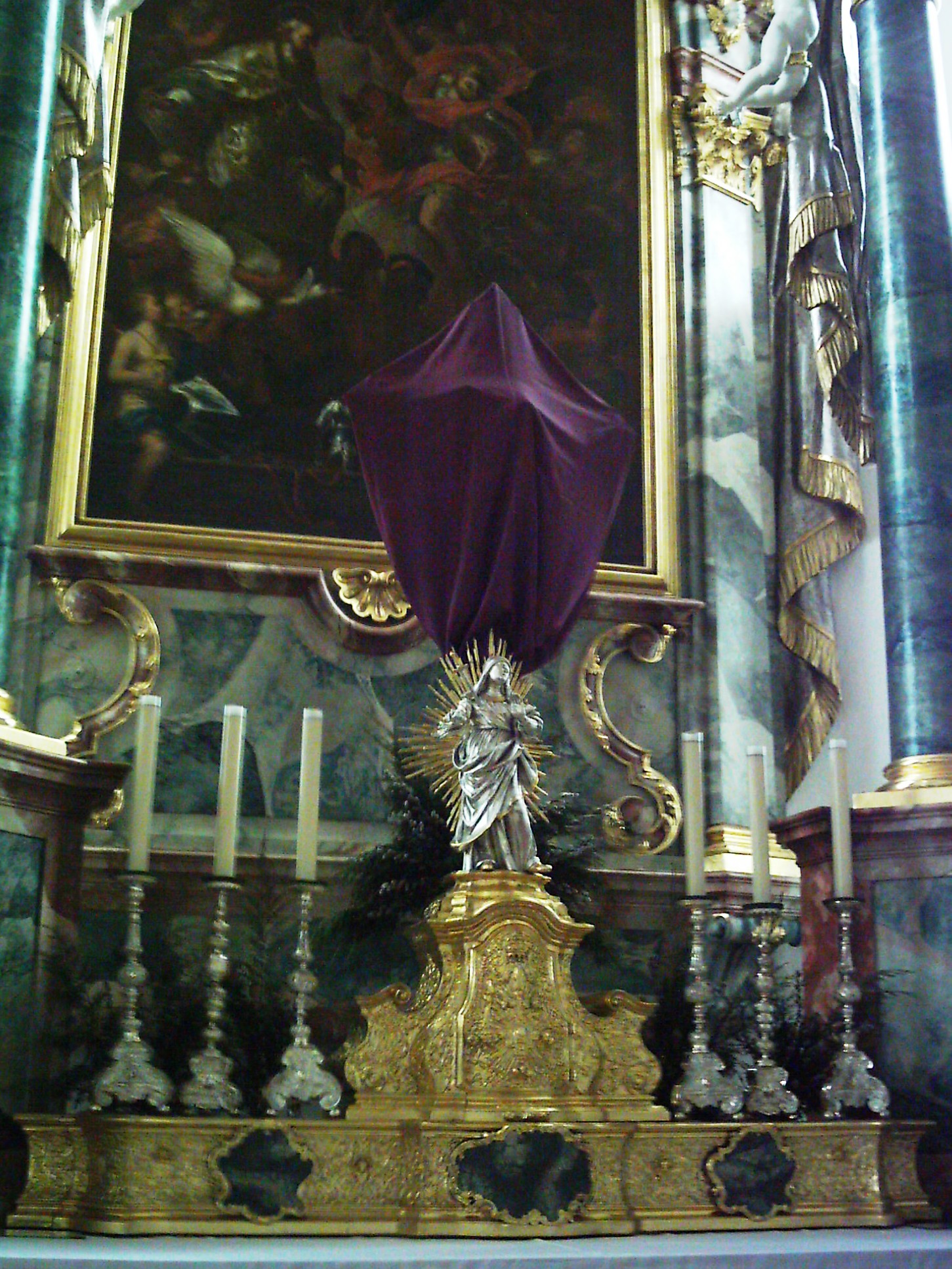
A crucifix on the high altar is veiled for Lent. Saint Martin's parish, Württemberg, Germany

In certain majority-Christian states, in which liturgical forms of Christianity predominate, religious objects were traditionally veiled for the entire 40 days of Lent. Though perhaps uncommon in the United States of America, this practice is consistently observed in Goa, Malta, Peru, the Philippines (the latter only for the entire duration of Holy Week, with the exception of processional images), and in the Spanish cities: Barcelona, Málaga, and Seville. In Ireland, before Vatican II, when impoverished rural Catholic convents and parishes could not afford purple fabrics, they resorted to either removing the statues altogether or, if too heavy or bothersome, turned the statues to face the wall. As is popular custom, the 14 Stations of the Cross plaques on the walls are not veiled.

Crosses were often adorned with jewels and gemstones, the form referred to as Crux Gemmata. To keep the faithful from adoring elaborately ornamented crucifixes, churches began veiling them in purple fabrics. The violet colour later came to symbolize penance and mourning.

Further liturgical changes in modernity reduced such observances to the last week of Passiontide. In parishes that could afford only small quantities of violet fabrics, only the heads of the statues were veiled. If no violet fabrics could be afforded at all, then the religious statues and images were turned around facing the wall. Flowers were removed as a sign of solemn mourning.

In the pre-1992 Methodist liturgy and pre-1970 forms of the Roman Rite, the last two weeks of Lent are known as Passiontide, a period beginning on the Fifth Sunday in Lent, which in the 1962 edition of the Roman Missal is called the First Sunday in Passiontide and in earlier editions Passion Sunday. All statues (and in England paintings as well) in the church were traditionally veiled in violet. This was seen as in keeping with John 8:46–59, the Gospel of that Sunday, in which Jesus "hid himself" from the people.

Within many churches in the United States of America, after the Second Vatican Council, the need to veil statues or crosses became increasingly irrelevant and was deemed unnecessary by some diocesan bishops. As a result, the veils were removed at the singing of the Gloria in Excelsis Deo during the Easter Vigil. In 1970, the name "Passiontide" was dropped, although the last two weeks are markedly different from the rest of the season, and continuance of the tradition of veiling images is left to the discretion of a country's conference of bishops or even to individual parishes as pastors may wish.

On Good Friday, the Anglican, Lutheran, and Methodist churches traditionally veiled "all pictures, statutes, and the cross are covered in mourning black", while "the chancel and altar coverings are replaced with black, and altar candles are extinguished." The fabrics are then "replaced with white on sunrise on Easter Sunday."

=== Vestments ===
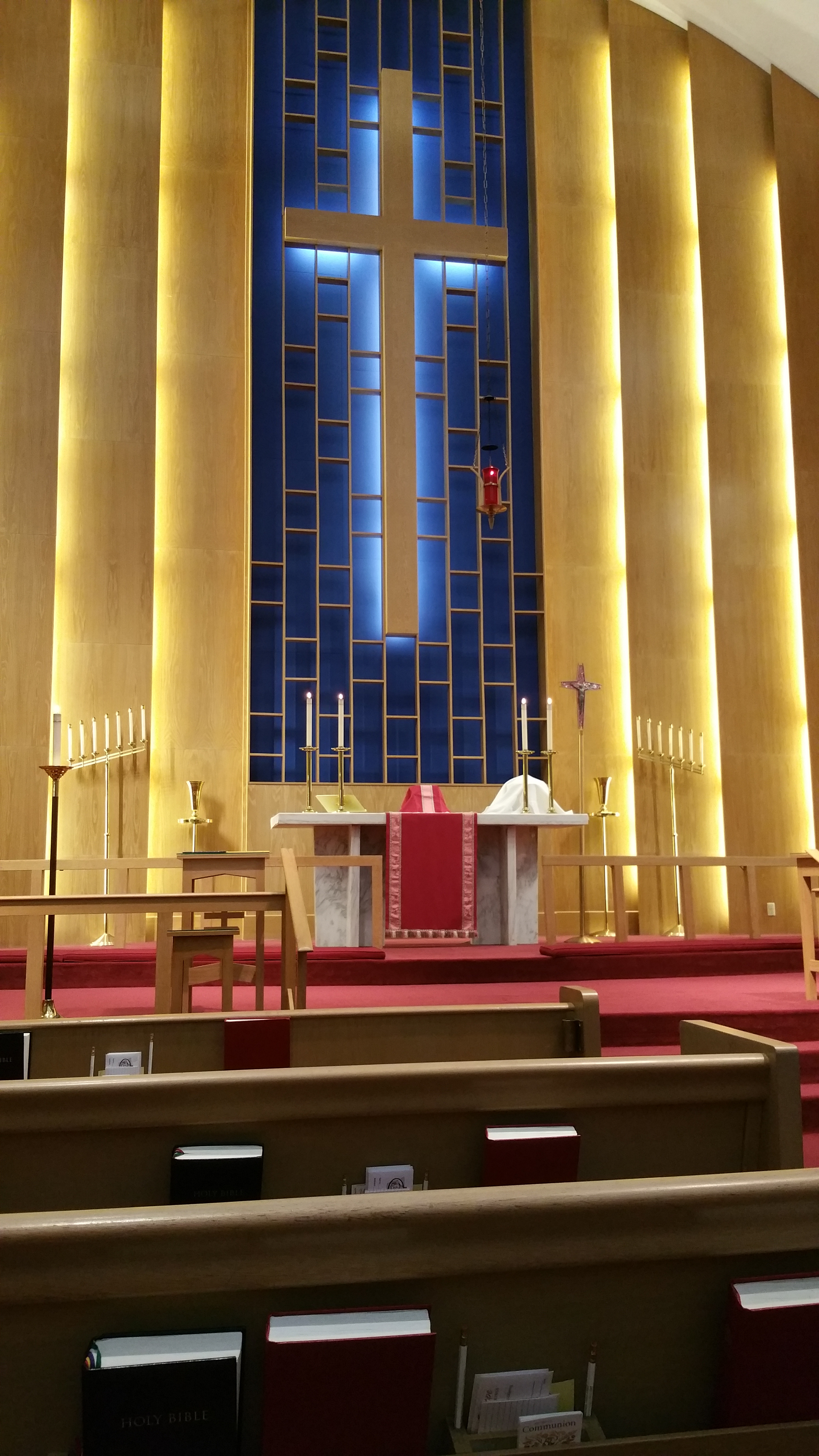
The chancel of a Lutheran church decorated with red paraments, the liturgical colour of the last week of Lent, Holy Week, in the Lutheran and Anglican Churches

In the Catholic, Lutheran, Methodist, and many Anglican churches, pastors and priests wear violet vestments during the season of Lent. Catholic priests and deacons wear white vestments on the solemnities of Saint Joseph and the Feast of the Annunciation (19 and 25 March). On the fourth Sunday of Lent, rose-coloured vestments may be worn, if available. Historically, black was also used for Lent: Pope Innocent III declared black to be the proper colour, though Durandus of Saint-Pourçain asserted violet was preferable to black.

In some Anglican churches, a type of unbleached linen or muslin known as "Lenten array" is worn during the first three weeks of Lent, crimson is worn during Passiontide, and on holy days, the colour proper to the day is worn. In certain other Anglican churches, as an alternative to violet for all of Lent except Holy Week and red beginning on Palm Sunday through Holy Saturday, Lenten array, typically made of sackcloth such as burlap and trimmed with crimson cloth, often velvet, is worn, even during Holy Week—since the sackcloth represents penance and the crimson edges represent the Passion of Christ. Even the veils that cover the altar crosses or crucifixes and statuary (if any) are made of the same sackcloth with the crimson trim.

== Holy days within the season of Lent ==
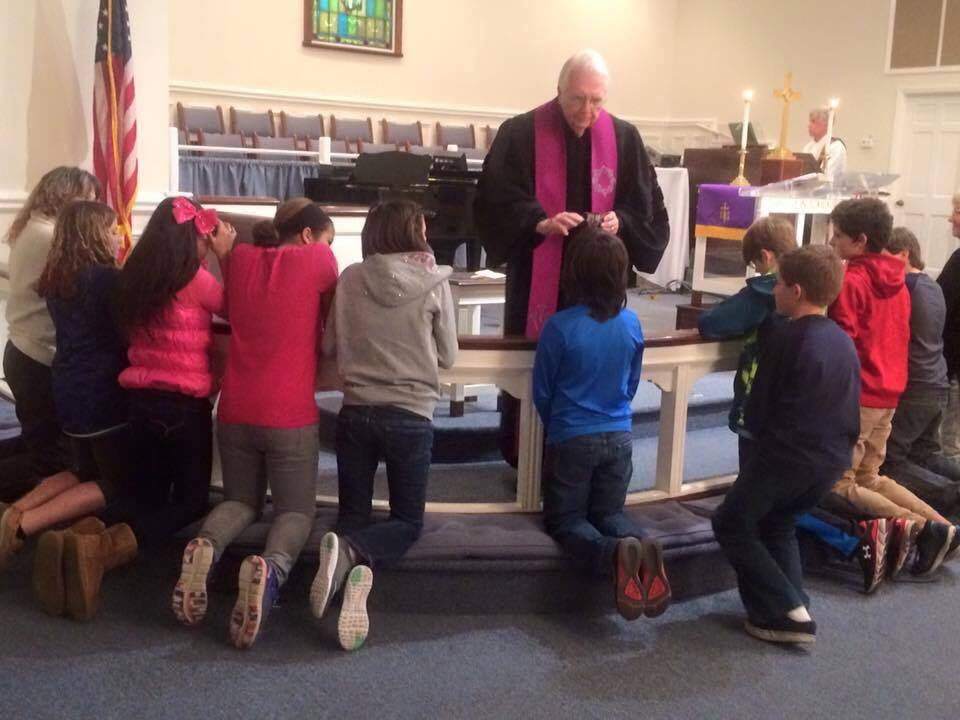
A Methodist minister distributing ashes to confirmands kneeling at the chancel rails on Ash Wednesday

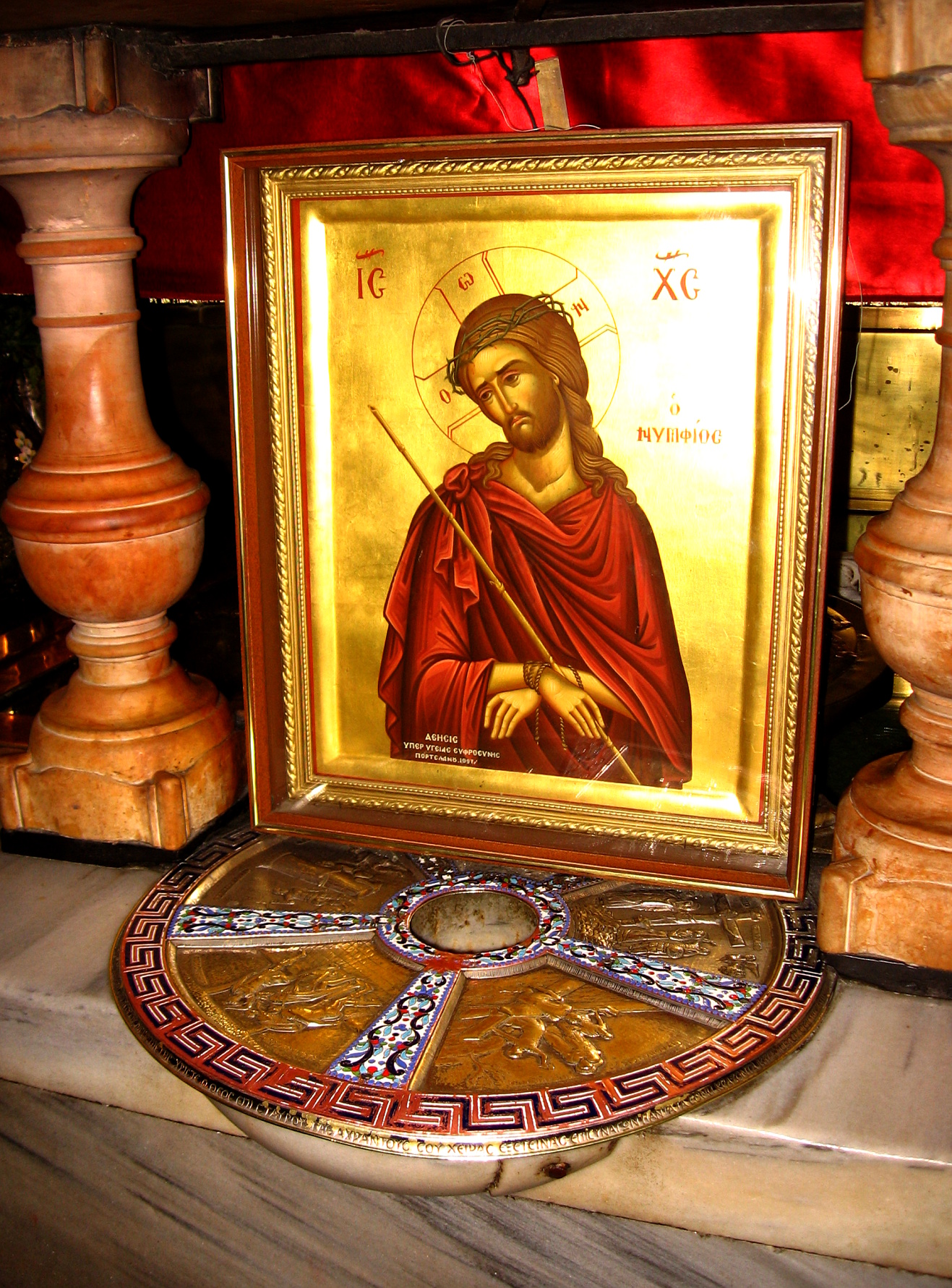
Church of the Holy Sepulchre, Old Jerusalem on Golgotha, Mount Calvary, where tradition claims Jesus was crucified and died

There are several holy days within the season of Lent:

- Clean Monday is the first day of Lent in Eastern Christianity.
- Ash Wednesday is the first day of Lent in Western Christianity, such as the Roman Rite of the Catholic Church, the Lutheran Churches, and Methodist Churches. However, in the Ambrosian Rite and the Mozarabic Rite, there is no Ash Wednesday: Lent begins on the first Sunday and the fast begins on the first Monday.
- Lenten Sundays:
  - The first Sunday of Lent marks one of the weeks during which Ember days are observed in Western Churches.
  - The second Sunday is also known as the Sunday of Transfiguration or Reminiscere Sunday
  - The third Sunday was traditionally known as Oculi Sunday, reflecting the opening words of the Introit, Oculi mei semper ad Dominum ("My eyes are ever toward the Lord"), from Psalm 25:15.
  - The fourth Sunday in Lent, which marks the halfway point between Ash Wednesday and Easter Sunday, is referred to as Laetare Sunday by Catholics, Anglicans, and many other Christians, because of the traditional Entrance Antiphon of the Mass. Due to the more "joyful" character of the day (since laetare in Latin means rejoice), the priest and deacon have the option of wearing vestments of a rose colour (pink) instead of violet.
    - Additionally, the fourth Lenten Sunday, Mothering Sunday, which has become known as Mother's Day in the United Kingdom and an occasion for honouring mothers of children, has its origin in a 16th-century celebration of the Mother Church.
    - The fourth Sunday of Lent has also been called "Rose Sunday"; on this day the Pope blesses the Golden Rose, a jewel in the shape of a rose.
  - The fifth Sunday in Lent, also known in some denominations as Passion Sunday (and in some denominations also applies to Palm Sunday) marks the beginning of Passiontide.
  - The sixth Sunday in Lent, commonly called Palm Sunday, marks the beginning of Holy Week, the final week of Lent immediately preceding Easter.
  - The Sundays in Lent carry Latin names in German Lutheranism, derived from the beginning of the Sunday's introit. The first is called Invocabit, the second Reminiscere, the third Oculi, the fourth Laetare, the fifth Judica, the sixth Palm Sunday.
- Wednesday of Holy Week, Holy Wednesday (also sometimes known as Spy Wednesday) commemorates Judas Iscariot's bargain to betray Jesus.
- Thursday of Holy Week is known as Maundy Thursday or Holy Thursday, and is a day Christians commemorate the Last Supper shared by Christ with his disciples.
- The next day is Good Friday, which begins the Easter Triduum; on this day Christians remember Jesus' crucifixion, death, and burial.

=== Easter Triduum ===
In the Catholic, Anglican, Lutheran, Old Catholic, and many other traditions, the Easter Triduum is a three-day event that begins Maundy Thursday evening, with the entrance hymn of the Mass of the Lord's Supper. After this celebration, the consecrated hosts are taken solemnly from the altar to a place of reposition, where the faithful are invited to meditate in the presence of the consecrated Hosts. This is the Church's response to Jesus' question to the disciples sleeping in the Garden of Gethsemane, "Could you not watch with me one hour?" On the next day, the liturgical commemoration of the Passion of Jesus Christ is celebrated at 3 pm, unless a later time is chosen due to work schedules.

This service consists of readings from the scriptures, especially John the Evangelist's account of the Passion of Jesus, followed by prayers, veneration of the cross of Jesus, and a communion service at which the hosts consecrated at the evening Mass of the day before are distributed. The Easter Vigil during the night between Holy Saturday afternoon and Easter Sunday morning starts with the blessing of a fire and a special candle, and with readings from Scripture associated with baptism. Then, the Gloria in Excelsis Deo is sung, water is blessed, baptism and confirmation of adults may take place, the people are invited to renew the promises of their own baptism, and finally, Mass is celebrated in the usual way from the Preparation of the Gifts onwards.

Holy Week and the season of Lent, depending on denomination and local custom, end with Easter Vigil at sundown on Holy Saturday or on the morning of Easter Sunday. It is custom for some churches to hold sunrise services which include open air celebrations in some places.

== Media coverage ==
In the United Kingdom, BBC's Radio Four normally broadcasts during Lent a series of programmes called the Lent Talks. These 15-minute programmes are normally broadcast on a Wednesday and have featured various speakers, such as Christian apologist John Lennox.

In the United States, popular Catholic Prayer and Meditation App, Hallow, runs prayer events throughout Lent with the current, #Pray40 2025 edition having over 1,000,000 praying together through Lent.

== See also ==
=== General ===
- Asceticism – Lifestyle of frugality and abstinence
- Penance – Repentance of sins
- Sacrifice – Offering of material possessions or the lives of animals or humans to a deity

=== Christianity ===
- Easter cycle – Part of the Christian liturgical year
- Alleluia, dulce carmen – Christian hymn
- Fast of Nineveh – Fast in Eastern Christianity
- Fasting § Christianity — Abstinence or reduced consumption of food and drink
- People's Sunday – First Sunday of Lent at Żabbar, Malta
- Quadragesima Sunday – The first Sunday in the season of Lent
- Quinquagesima – Sunday before Ash Wednesday
- Prayer before a crucifix – Roman Catholic prayer recited on after Mass
- Saint Michael's Lent – Period of fasting observed in the Catholic Church
- Refreshment Sunday – Christian celebration during Lent
- Station days – Christian days of fasting
- Three Sundays of Commemoration – Three consecutive Sundays before Lent
