= Collation (meal) =

Light meal

A collation is a light meal. In Western Christianity, the term "collation" can also refer to one or two light meals allowed on days of fasting, where its purpose is to allow a believer to perform their duties while fasting throughout the day.

== Christian fasting ==
=== History ===
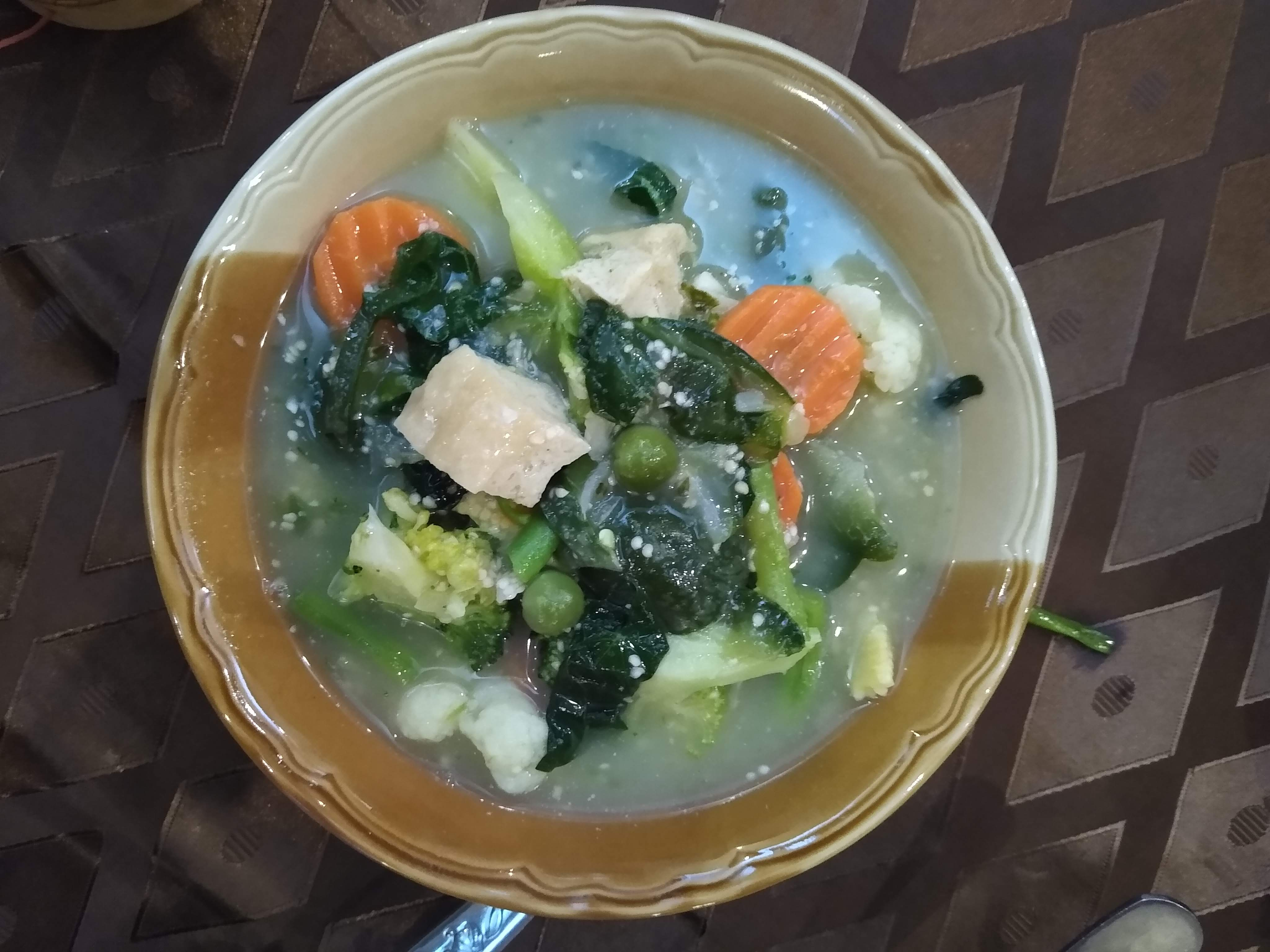
A collation can be a small amount of food taken on Christian fasting days.

The traditional Black Fast of Western Christianity, which was broken after sunset, did not permit a collation if strictly observed. After the 14th century AD, taking a collation became a normative part of Christian fasting practices in many localities. Water was not allowed to be consumed during the collation, but only during the main meal, which was taken after sunset.

The consumption of a collation originally derives from the rule dating from the mid-6th century A.D. in Benedictine monasteries, that the usual evening meal was to be followed by the reading of excerpts from Collationes patrum in Scetica eremo written by John Cassian in around 420 A.D. However, according to the Rule of Saint Benedict, on days of fasting there would be no evening meal: Vespers was directly followed by the readings from the Collationes or the Lives of the Fathers, and then Compline.

By the 9th century AD the strict rules about fasting in Western Christianity started to become more relaxed, as it became allowed to have a small amount of water in the evening on fast days. Over the centuries, this eventually grew to apply to the indulgence of "a recognized quantity of solid food" allowed on days of fasting, with or without abstinence. The evening collation came to be defined by the Catholic Church as being less than eight ounces of food. In the 19th century, the allowance of another collation, called a frustulum, was introduced by the Catholic Church and is permitted to be eaten in the morning.

=== Present day ===
At the present time, on Christian strict fasting days of Lent (Ash Wednesday and Good Friday), the Catholic Church prescribes "only one full meal a day, but does not prohibit taking some food in the morning and evening, observing — as far as quantity and quality are concerned — approved local custom.". This is, in some places, interpreted as "one full meal, as well as two smaller meals that together are not equal to a full meal".

Similarly, a Missouri Synod Lutheran publication delineating fasting guidelines states that "On fasting days, two ¼ meals are eaten, and one regular meal in the evening". The Traditional Saint Augustine's Prayer Book: A Book of Devotion for Members of the Anglican Communion defines "Fasting, usually meaning not more than a light breakfast, one full meal, and one half meal, on the forty days of Lent."

== Other uses ==
The French court of Louis XIV used the term collation to refer to light meals in general. In British English today, a collation is likewise a light meal, offered to guests when there is insufficient time for fuller entertainment. It is often rendered cold collation in reference to the usual lack of hot or cooked food. The Polish word kolacja ("supper") is a derivation.

In modern Italian, the two small meals are the prima colazione (breakfast) and seconda colazione (lunch). The word "colazione" itself in the general language now means "breakfast" (whereas the English "break their fast" for breakfast; lunch is pranzo in Italian).
