= Daniel Fast =

Partial fast in Christianity

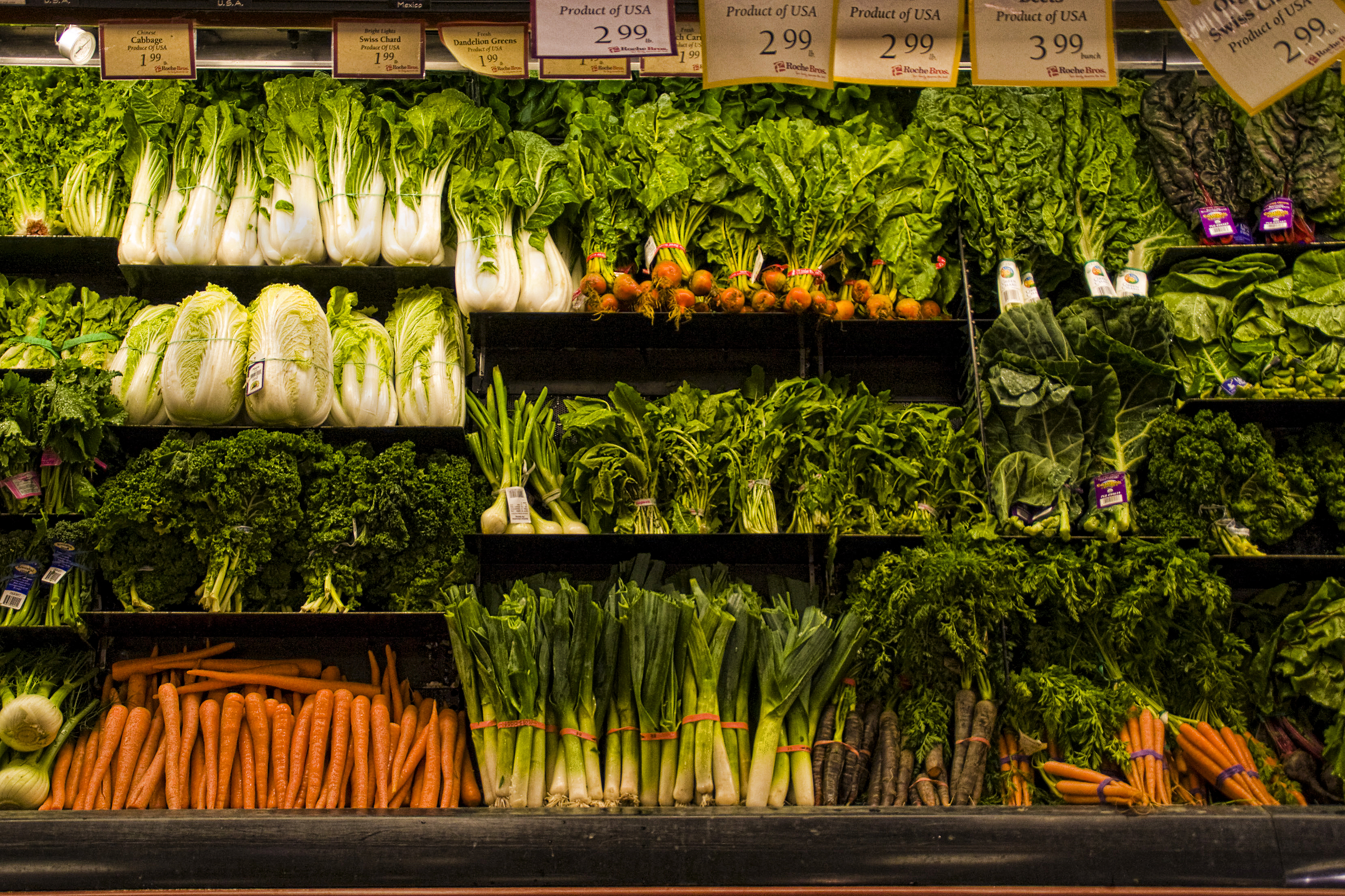
Vegetables in a supermarket in the United States

The Daniel Fast, in Christianity, is a partial fast, in which meat, dairy, alcohol, and other rich foods are avoided in favor of vegetables and water in order to be more sensitive to God. The fast is based on the lifelong kosher diet of the Jewish prophet Daniel in the biblical Book of Daniel and the three-week mourning fast in which Daniel abstained from all meat and wine. Among Catholic and Mainline Protestant Christians, the Daniel Fast has been practiced by some during the 40-day season of Lent, though the Daniel Fast can variously be set at three weeks, or even ten days. As such, evangelical Christian churches such as those of the Baptist tradition, have partaken in the fast at various times of the year. The passage in Chapter 1 refers to a 10-day test wherein Daniel and others with him were permitted to eat vegetables and water to avoid the Babylonian king's food and wine. After remaining healthy at the end of the 10-day period, they continued the vegetable diet for the three years of their education. The passage in Chapter 10 refers to a three-week fast of no meat, wine, or rich food. In addition to the practices of fasting and abstinence undertaken during the Daniel Fast, Christians may also add spiritual disciplines such as daily church attendance, increased prayer, as well as the reading of Sacred Scripture and a daily devotional.

== Description ==
According to those who encourage this form of fasting, the aim is to refrain from eating what are described in Daniel as "royal foods" including meats and wine. Instead, the diet consists only of vegetables and water. "Pulses" is used instead of "vegetables" in some translations. "Pulses" in this context is often taken as "food grown from seed", including fruit, vegetables or lentils.

== Scriptural basis ==
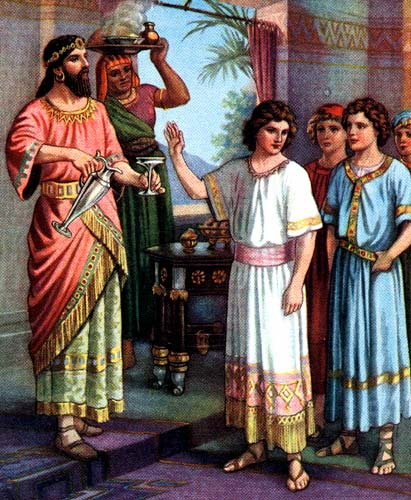
Daniel refusing to eat at the king's table, early 1900s Bible illustration

Nebuchadnezzar II became king of the Chaldean Empire in 605 BCE. He invaded the Israelite Kingdom of Judah in 604 BCE, the fifth year of the reign of King Jehoiakim of Judah. After Jehoiakim's son Jeconiah became king, Nebuchadnezzar attacked the Israelite capital of Jerusalem in 597 BCE. In the biblical narrative of the first chapter of the Book of Daniel, Nebuchadnezzar's siege of Jerusalem happened in the third year of the reign of Jehoiakim, whose successor Jeconiah is not mentioned. Elsewhere in the Bible, Jehoiakim was already dead at the time of the siege of Jerusalem. The first chapter of the Book of Daniel was most likely composed as early as 450 BCE and as late as the 2nd century BCE. In the narrative, the God of the Israelites, Yahweh, let King Jehoiakim fall to Nebuchadnezzar. Daniel, three friends, and fellow captives have been brought to the Chaldean capital, the newly rebuilt Babylon, to learn the literature of the Chaldeans. Nebuchadnezzar offered them royal food and wine for the three years of their education. Daniel decided not to defile himself with the royal rations, which included meat that may not have been drained of blood, as required by Jewish law, or that was likely often used as ritual offering to the Babylonian god Marduk and his divine son Nabu. Daniel refused to eat foods forbidden by Yahweh and instead asked for vegetables and water. The guard charged with their care expressed concern for their health, so Daniel requested a short test of the diet. For 10 days, they were permitted to eat just vegetables, and at the end, the guard was surprised at their good personal appearance and physical and mental health, compared to those who had accepted the royal foods. Therefore, Daniel and his friends were permitted to eat vegetables for the duration of their training.

And the king appointed for them a daily portion of the king's dainties, (Note: "royal rations of food" or "food from the royal table" in modern translations) and of the wine which he drank, and that they should be nourished three years; that at the end thereof they should stand before the king. Now among these were, of the children of Judah, Daniel, Hananiah, Mishael, and Azariah ...

But Daniel purposed in his heart that he would not defile himself with the king's dainties, nor with the wine which he drank ... Then said Daniel to the steward whom the prince of the eunuchs had appointed over Daniel, Hananiah, Mishael, and Azariah: Prove thy servants, I beseech thee, ten days; and let them give us pulse (Note: "vegetables" in modern translations) to eat, and water to drink ...

So he hearkened unto them in this matter, and proved them ten days. And at the end of ten days their countenances appeared fairer, and they were fatter in flesh, than all the youths that did eat of the king's dainties. So the steward took away their dainties, and the wine that they should drink, and gave them pulse.

— Book of Daniel, ASV, chapter 1, verses 5-16

After continuing with the diet during three years of training, they are judged by the king to be mentally superior to all of his own councilors.

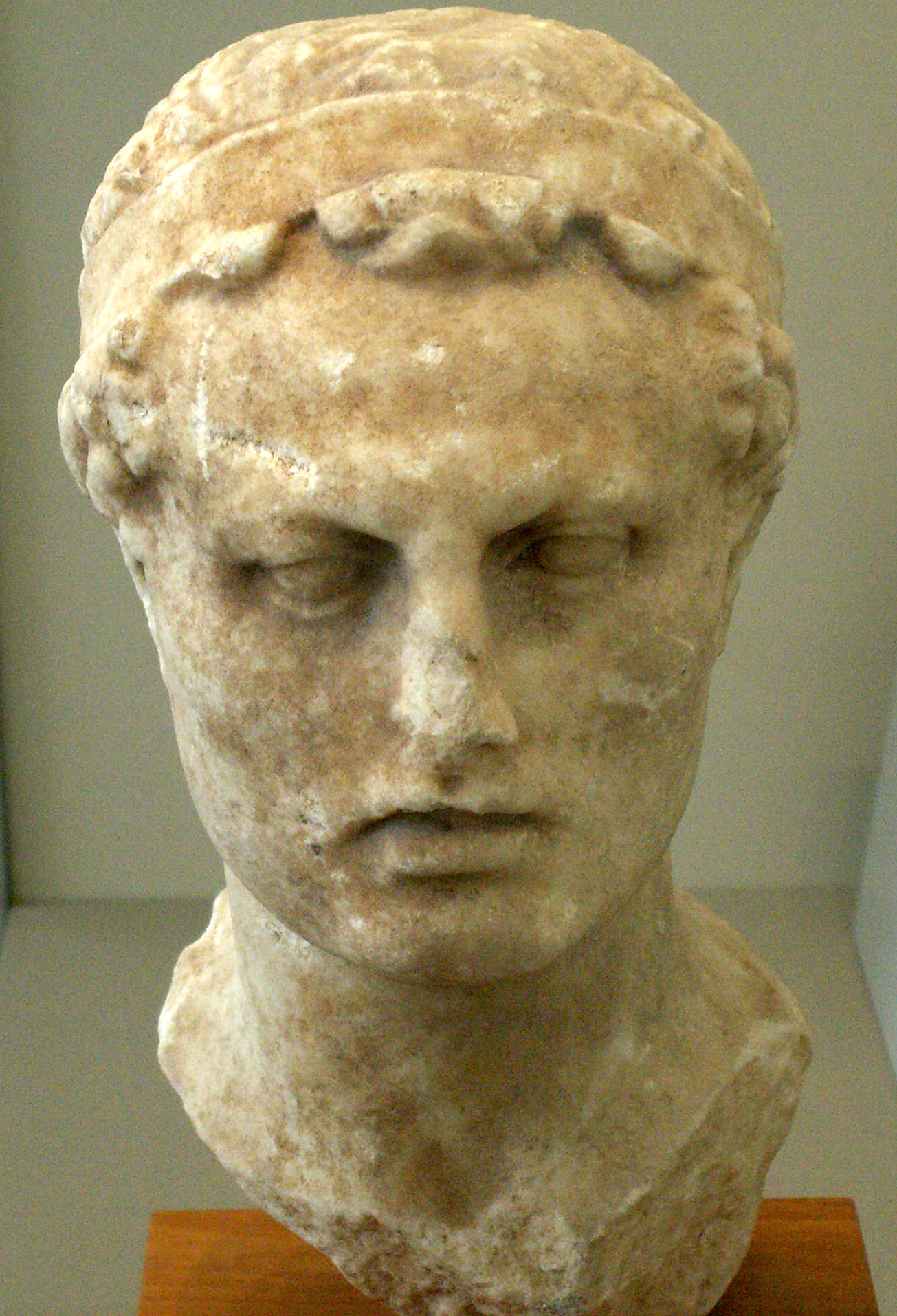
Bust of the anti-Semitic King Antiochus IV at the Altes Museum in Berlin

Cyrus the Great captured Babylon in 539 BCE, fifty-eight years after the fall of Jerusalem. In the narrative of the tenth chapter of the Book of Daniel, in the third year of the reign of Cyrus, Daniel went into a mourning fast for the first three weeks of the year, including Passover. During the fast, he had no meat, wine, or rich foods. The tenth chapter, and possibly the whole of the Book of Daniel, was composed between 167 and 164 BCE, during the persecution of Jewish people carried out by the Hellenistic King Antiochus IV Epiphanes.

In those days I, Daniel, was mourning three whole weeks. I ate no pleasant bread, (Note: "rich food" or "savory food" in modern translations) neither came flesh nor wine into my mouth ...

— Book of Daniel, ASV, chapter 10, verses 2-3

== History ==
The Daniel Fast is derived from the Bible, which states in Daniel 10:3 (written in the 2nd century BC) that "I ate no pleasant bread, neither came flesh nor wine in my mouth, neither did I anoint myself at all, till three whole weeks were fulfilled."

In the early Church, the Canons of Hippolytus (4th century AD) authorize only bread and salt to be consumed during Holy Week, the last week of Lent. The practice of fasting and abstaining from alcohol, meat and dairy products during the entire liturgical season Lent became established in the Church.

Ellen G. White, founder of the Seventh-day Adventist tradition, wrote in 1881 that the example of Daniel demonstrates that "a strict compliance with the requirements of God is beneficial to the health of body and mind." In January 2019 Time magazine reported that "Chris Pratt gave it new popularity recently by posting an Instagram story about adopting it as his latest diet."

In modern times, the Daniel Fast has gained popularity among Christians, such as Catholics and Methodists among others, during the Lenten season for those seeking to return to traditional norms of Christian fasting. It is practiced during other times of the year too by evangelical Christian churches, such as the Saddleback Church of the Baptist tradition.

== Practice ==
The Daniel Fast limits food choices to vegetables and water as stated in the Book of Daniel. The Daniel Fast prescribes the vegan diet in that it excludes the consumption of animal products. The diet also excludes processed foods, additives, preservatives, spices, flavorings, sweeteners, caffeine, alcohol, and products made with grains.

== See also ==
- Christian dietary laws
- Christian fasting
- Christian vegetarianism
- Friday fast
- Ta'anit, a fast in Judaism
