= Black Fast =

Ancient form of Christian fasting

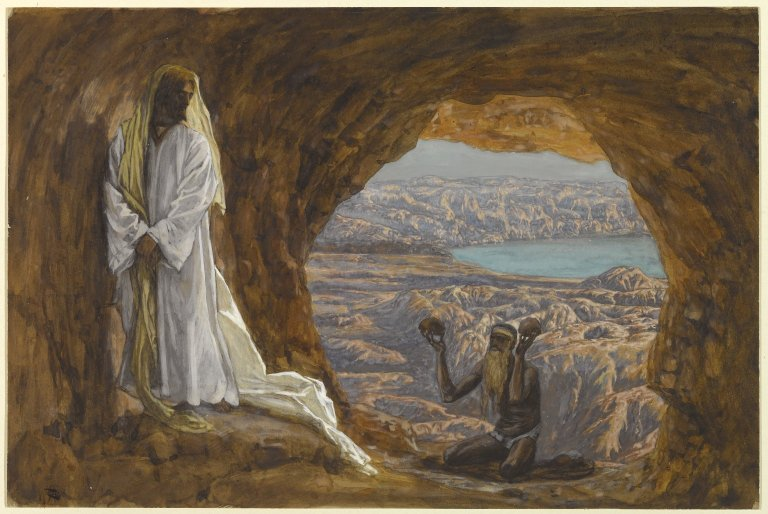
Jesus Tempted in the Wilderness (Jésus tenté dans le désert), James Tissot, Brooklyn Museum

A Black Fast, also known as a strict fast, is a form of early Christian fasting. Those undertaking a Black Fast consume no food or water during the day and then break the fast after sunset with prayer, as well as water and a meal devoid of meat, eggs, dairy products (lacticinia), and alcohol. Christians normatively fasted in this way during Lent prior to the 6th century.

== Description and practice ==
Traditionally, the Black Fast is undertaken during Lent; it is the early Christian form of fasting consisting of fasting until sunset, and then consuming one meal without meat, dairy, eggs, or alcohol afterwards (with food and water being allowed only at this time). This was the normative way of Christian fasting prior to the 6th century A.D. and among certain denominations (such as the Coptic Orthodox Church) and in some localities of the Indian subcontinent, many Christians continue to observe the Black Fast throughout the whole season of Lent. Throughout the 19th and 20th centuries, the Black Fast was the normative way of fasting in Ireland on Ash Wednesday and Good Friday.

The pattern of fasting and praying for 40 days is seen in the Christian Bible, on which basis the liturgical season of Lent was established. In the Old Testament, the prophet Moses went into the mountains for 40 days and 40 nights to pray and fast "without eating bread or drinking water" before receiving the Ten Commandments (cf. Exodus 34:28). Likewise, the prophet Elijah went into the mountains for 40 days and nights to fast and pray "until he reached Horeb, the mountain of God" when "the word of the Lord came to him" (cf. 1 Kings 19:8–9). The early Christian bishop Maximus of Turin wrote that as Elijah by "fasting continuously for a period of forty days and forty nights ... merited to extinguish the prolonged and severe dryness of the whole world, doing so with a stream of rain and steeping the earth's dryness with the bounty of water from heaven", in the Christian tradition, this is interpreted as being "a figure of ourselves so that we, also fasting a total of forty days, might merit the spiritual rain of baptism...[and] a shower from heaven might pour down upon the dry earth of the whole world, and the abundant waters of the saving bath might saturate the lengthy drought of the Gentiles." In the New Testament, Jesus went into the desert to fast and pray for 40 days and 40 nights; it was during this time that Satan tried to tempt him (cf. Matthew 4:1–3). The 40-day and night fasts of Moses, Elijah, and Jesus prepared them for their work.

After attending a worship service (often on Wednesday or Friday evenings), it is common for Christians of various denominations to break that day's Lenten fast together through a communal Lenten supper, which is held in the church's parish hall in the public setting; in the home setting Lenten Suppers take place in the context of a family meal every day during Lent (except on the Lord's Day). Throughout the entire Christian year, many Christians keep the Black Fast on Wednesdays (in memory of Jesus' betrayal) and on Fridays (to mourn the crucifixion of Jesus). In Western Christianity, many monastics still retain this practice, though many laypeople voluntarily undertake the Black Fast, especially on Good Friday.

The details of the Black Fast are as follows:

- No food or liquids are allowed from midnight until sunset.
- One vegetarian meal a day (with water) is permitted, only after sunset.
- A mealtime prayer is offered at the time the Black Fast is broken.
- Flesh meat, eggs, and dairy products (lacticinia: milk, butter, and cheese) are forbidden.
- Alcohol is forbidden.
- During Holy Week (the final week of Lent), the Lenten supper meal consists exclusively of bread, salt, herbs, and water. (Note: During Holy Week, the early Church's Apostolic Constitutions enjoin for the meal eaten after sundown: bread, salt, water, nuts, as well as vegetables cooked with water and salt.)

When undertaking a Black Fast, married couples abstain from sexual intercourse.

=== Oriental Orthodoxy ===
==== Coptic Orthodox Church ====
In the Coptic Orthodox Church, the Black Fast is the normative way of fasting during Great Lent; Coptic Orthodox Christians go without water and food from midnight to sunset; after that time, the consumption of water and one vegetarian meal is permitted. Married couples abstain from sexual relations during this period "to give themselves time for fasting and prayer (1 Cor. 7: 5)."

=== Eastern Orthodoxy, Eastern Catholicism and Eastern Lutheranism ===
The Black Fast is observed by the devout Eastern Orthodox laity or monks throughout Great Lent, as well as the three other fasting periods of the year (the Dormition Fast, Nativity Fast, and the Apostles' Fast) and occasionally on the weekly fast days of Wednesday and Friday.

Some Eastern Catholics and Eastern Lutherans perform the Black Fast on Fridays during Lent, especially on Good Friday.

==== Romanian Orthodox Church ====
The term "Black Fast" has a different connotation within the Romanian Orthodox Church, which defines it somewhat similar to the definition given by those within the realms of the Classical Pentecostal movement.

=== Western Christianity ===
In the denominations of Western Christianity, some Christians undertake the Black Fast during the 40 days of Lent, especially on Ash Wednesday (the first day of Lent) and Good Friday (in order to mark the crucifixion of Christ). In the 20th century, the Black Fast was done by Christians in Ireland on these days. Christians of the Indian subcontinent perform the Black Fast during Lent as well, especially on Ash Wednesday and Good Friday.

==== Roman Catholicism ====
The Black Fast was widely practiced by the faithful during the Lenten season by "kings and princes, clergy and laity, rich and poor". In addition, the Black Fast was kept on the days preceding one's ordination. When fasting today, Roman Catholics have the liberty to fast in this manner, or in the modern fashion in which a collation is permitted. Fasting rules were liberalised to avoid accidents due to weakness or lack of concentration in modern industrial jobs. For the same reason some soldiers in military orders like the Hospitallers were historically exempt from the strict rule.

==== Lutheranism ====
In the Lutheran Churches, Good Friday has been historically kept by many believers as a day to observe the Black Fast. A Handbook for the Discipline of Lent recommends the Lutheran guideline to "Fast on Ash Wednesday and Good Friday with only one simple meal during the day, usually without meat".

==== Anglicanism ====
In Anglican Communion, the faithful have observed the Black Fast on "the two great Prayer Book fast days, Ash Wednesday and Good Friday". The Black Fast was especially popular during the 19th century as it sought to imitate "the fasting of the ancient church."

==== Pentecostalism ====
In Classical Pentecostalism, a Black Fast is complete abstinence from food or water and nothing is consumed in its duration.

Ward states that the terms "Black Fast," "Hebrew Fast," and "Absolute Fast" are synonymous. British evangelical Arthur Wallis coined the term "Absolute Fast" in his book God's Chosen Fast (1968).

A Normal Fast or "Complete Fast" consists of eating nothing but drinking pure water. A Partial Fast (or Daniel Fast) consists of abstinence, either eliminating all but one type of food or eliminating just one type of food. The Black Fast is observed on rare occasions in Pentecostal circles while the Normal Fast is most usually undertaken.
