= Karpovskaya (disambiguation) =

- Karpovskaya
- Karpovskaya, Vytegorsky District, Vologda Oblast
- Karpovskaya, Tarnogsky District, Vologda Oblast
- Karpovskaya, Yavengskoye Rural Settlement, Vozhegodsky District, Vologda Oblast
- Feminine form of the Russian surname Karpovsky

== See also ==
- Karpovsky (disambiguation)
