= Karpovsky (disambiguation) =

Karpovsky (Russian: Карповский) is a rural locality (a settlement) and the administrative center of Novokarpovsky Selsoviet, Tyumentsevsky District, Altai Krai, Russia.

- Karpovsky, Volgograd Oblast, rural locality (a khutor) in Bocharovskoye Rural Settlement, Novoanninsky District, Volgograd Oblast, Russia
- Karpovsky (surname)

== See also ==
- Karpovskaya (disambiguation)
