= Ignatiy Lapkin =

Russian Orthodox preacher and author (1939–2026)

- Игнатий Лапкин
- Lapkin in 1991
- Born: 10 June 1939; Karpovsky, Altai Krai, Russian SFSR, Soviet Union
- Died: 2 November 2026 (aged 87); Poteryayevka, Altai Krai, Russia
- Other name: IgLa (pseudonym)
- Education: Barnaul Construction Technical College
- Occupation: Preacher
- Organization: Exaltation of the Cross community
- Known for: Establishing and running controversial religious community
- Criminal charges: Distributing samizdat literature
- Criminal penalty: 2½ years in a penal colony
- Criminal status: Released early
- Father: Tikhon Dmitriyevich Lapkin

Ignatiy Tikhonovich Lapkin (Russian: Игнатий Тихонович Лапкин; 10 June 1939 – 2 November 2026), also known by the pseudonym IgLa (Russian: ИгЛа), was a Soviet and Russian Orthodox figure, missionary, and preacher. His religious activities drew criticism from representatives of the Russian Orthodox Church (ROC) and authors of missionary publications, who characterized them as sectarian. He declared his affiliation with the Russian Orthodox Church Outside of Russia (ROCOR) and the Russian Old-Orthodox Church (ROCC). ROCOR forbade Lapkin's communities to present themselves as its subdivisions. Lapkin himself and his community also refused to comply with the Russian Orthodox Church's directives, a stance that an expert on sects, Sergiy Dudin, viewed as an act of schism and a characteristic example of sectarianism.

Lapkin was born into a large Old Believer family, which, according to Lapkin's memories, was characterized by austerity, poverty, and deep religiosity. He later came to follow Old Believer traditions. Given his religious activities, he was persecuted by Soviet security agencies, but was subsequently rehabilitated. During the perestroika era and the 1990s, he founded a number of religious organizations whose activities drew criticism from ROC representatives. He gained widespread notoriety for his actions involving the de facto occupation of the abandoned village of Poteryayevka (in Mamontovsky District) and the establishment of a children's camp there, an operation in which violations of Russian Federation law were identified, including the use of child labour and the practice of corporal punishment. After an inspection by Rospotrebnadzor, the camp was shut down; however, it subsequently continued its operations illegally and semi-clandestinely.

An anti-communist, Lapkin spoke in support of – and prayed for – Vladimir Putin, Recep Erdoğan, and Donald Trump. He was a proponent of Aleksandr Solzhenitsyn and his ideas. He asserted the authenticity of The Protocols of the Elders of Zion, a document that is an antisemitic forgery. Within his community, he adhered to the principles of the Domostroy and a patriarchal structure. As part of his religious teachings, he preached that the outside world was inherently corrupt and that it was necessary to maintain a distance from it. Within the community, interaction with unbelievers and the outside world was restricted; furthermore, turning to secular authorities or disclosing information about the community's life was discouraged.

== Biography ==
=== Life before religion ===
Lapkin was born on 10 June 1939, into a large family of "priestless" Old Believers (Bespopovtsy) in the settlement of Karpovsky in the Altai Krai. The family lost a significant portion of their property during the period of collectivization in the USSR and lived in poverty. Lapkin spent his childhood within the framework of the Old Believers' strict ascetic traditions. His father, Tikhon Dmitriyevich Lapkin, served in the Great Patriotic War; in 1941, he was severely wounded, lost his left arm, and was classified as having a Group II disability. Subsequently, the family moved to the village of Poteryayevka, where Lapkin spent his childhood years.

In 1956, he graduated from the Korchino Secondary School in the Sharchinsky District, and in 1959, he completed his studies at the Barnaul Construction Technical College, qualifying as a construction technician for industrial and civil engineering. Upon graduation, he was assigned to a correctonal labour camp (ITL), where he began working as a site foreman in March. In October of the same year, he was conscripted into the Soviet Navy, serving as a radio operator. Later in his service, he was transferred to the Strategic Missile Forces (RVSN), where he held the positions of maintenance technician and squad leader for telephone operators.

=== Turning to religion and the beginning of preaching activity ===
Lapkin in Poteryayevka, 2016

During his military service, after watching the French film Les Misérables (1958), Lapkin, by his own account, came to believe in God. He began openly observing religious fasts and sharing his religious views with his fellow soldiers, which led to him being sent for a psychiatric evaluation. Based on the results, a military medical commission deemed Lapkin unfit for further service, and he was discharged under the diagnosis of "sluggish schizophrenia". According to Lapkin's own recollections, he was beaten and tortured while in hospital.

After returning from his military service, Lapkin took a job as a concrete worker at the Lipay General Construction Trust in the town of Iskitim, Novosibirsk Oblast. Later, according to his own account, pressure from local authorities, stemming from his preaching activities, effectively forced him to relocate to the Baltic region where he enrolled in a maritime school. In 1962 he was assigned as a sailor on a naval vessel. Around the same time, he read the New Testament and, by his own description, came to believe in Christ through the Gospel while in prayer. Subsequently, an Old Believer priest secretly performed the rite of chrismation for him at a private house.

In 1963–1964, he worked as a concrete worker in a Latvian town, and also served as the commander of a security unit at an oil transshipment depot. In 1966, he married in Novosibirsk. Until 1969, he worked as a carpenter in various localities across the Volgograd, Penza, and Novosibirsk regions. He did not have steady employment until 1972, at which point he took a job as a fitter, a position he held until 1979. From 1979, he worked as a watchman until his conviction in 1986. In the 1970s and 1980s, he was involved in the samizdat distribution of religious literature, for which he was arrested in 1980 under Article 190-1 of the Criminal Code of the RSFSR. By a decision of the prosecutor's office, he was released on his own recognizance (on the condition that he not leave the area), and the criminal case was subsequently dropped.

In 1986, Lapkin was arrested once again by the KGB under Articles 162 and 190-1 of the RSFSR Criminal Code for his continued involvement in the creation and distribution of Orthodox samizdat literature, as well as for preaching and disseminating Old Believer teachings. He was ultimately sentenced to two and a half years in a general-regime penal colony. In 1987, he was released early and granted a pardon.

=== Religious activity ===
With the onset of perestroika and the USSR's subsequent downfall, Lapkin began to engage in religious activities openly. In 1992, he was rehabilitated. Later, he became involved in legal disputes with the government of Altai Krai. In 1997, the parties reached a settlement agreement, which provided for the transfer of property amounting to roughly 1,365 m^{2} of land to Lapkin.

In 1991, by decree of the Synod of Bishops of the Russian Orthodox Church Outside of Russia, the Exaltation of the Cross community, which had been established by Lapkin, was officially registered. That same year, it was also registered by the Ministry of Justice of the Altai Krai. Lapkin became the community's permanent church warden. The same year, he arrived in the village of Poteryayevka where he had spent his childhood; he effectively took over the deserted village, establishing a tent camp there and beginning unauthorized construction.

In 1995, Lapkin secured formal registration for a public organization called the "Rural Community of the Village of Poteryayevka", as well as a religious community within the village. There, he founded an authoritarian community which some researchers and representatives of the Russian Orthodox Church have characterized as a sect. Within the community, interaction with unbelievers and the outside world was restricted; members were forbidden to turn to secular authorities or to share details about the community's life with outsiders. According to Dmitry Bykov's account, only Lapkin could grant permission for such actions. That same year, Lapkin opened an informal children's camp named after Clement of Ancyra.

As early as 1999, the camp became the subject of a scandal when local sanitary and epidemiological authorities uncovered numerous violations of the law. In 2000, the camp was stripped of its legal registration but continued its operations without any oversight from the Altai Krai's authorities.

=== Federal scandal ===
In 2016, the camp became the subject of a nationwide scandal. It was accused of exploiting child labour, abusing children, and systematically violating the laws of the Russian Federation. As a result, the camp was closed. This latest scandal notwithstanding, Lapkin subsequently continued his work, effectively operating semi-clandestinely and illegally.

Whenever Rospotrebnadzor representatives appeared, Lapkin would instruct the children and members of his community to hide from the inspectors. He also threatened to take refuge in a nearby forest, "where they [the inspectors] would be unable to get through, either by vehicle or on foot". Lapkin held unquestioned authority within the community, and his decisions were to be carried out without objection.

Later, former camp attendees spoke of psychological abuse, humiliating living conditions, and unsanitary environments. According to accounts from former residents, children were subjected to sleep deprivation, forced to stand outside at night, whipped, and beaten with stinging nettles, even when there was merely a suspicion of disloyalty. Furthermore, the children were compelled to perform labour, and the residents of Poteryayevka exploited them as a source of free, forced labour. The village was closed to outsiders; whenever any appeared, the residents – including children – were forced to hide. Punishments varied; according to media reports, children were subjected not only to physical punishment but also to psychological abuse.

=== Death ===
Lapkin died on 2 November 2026, at the age of 87.

== Others' opinions ==
In 2014, in an interview with the radio station Echo of Moscow for the programme Church and Society: Points of Intersection, Andrey Kuraev, while responding to a question about figures in church history, cited Lapkin as an example:

Well, just the other day on my blog, I featured one of these kinds of figures: Ignatiy Lapkin from Barnaul — a truly remarkable man, possessing an extraordinary sense of freedom. While I disagree with him on many points, I envy his remarkable integrity. At first, many people left indignant comments, dozens of them, but then, after listening to one of his talks for an hour...

== Internet memes ==
In August 2016, a videoclip from an Orthodox children's camp in the village of Poteryayevka gained widespread circulation online; in it, Lapkin instructed the children to hide from law enforcement officers and Rospotrebnadzor officials, using bell signals to warn them of the inspectors' approach. During an inspection, when asked about permission for children to swim in a nearby body of water, the preacher declared: "It's God's body of water! They are God's children!" The release of the video footage drew significant public attention to the camp, and its circulation online was noted by regional media outlets.

In the years that followed, Lapkin gained notoriety as a figure in internet memes. Russian media outlets attributed his meme-related fame to the circulation of short videos showcasing his unusual and radical childrearing methods.
