= Poteryayevka =

Poteryayevka Потеряевка
- Settlement
- Location within Altai Krai Location within Russia
- Coordinates: 52°59′N 81°51′E
- Country: Russia
- Region: Altai Krai
- District: Mamontovsky District
- Time zone: UTC+7:00

Poteryayevka (Russian: Потеряевка) is a rural locality (a settlement) in Mamontovsky District, Altai Krai, Russia. The population was 33 as of 2013. There are 9 streets.

== Geography ==
Poteryayevka is located 64 km northeast of Mamontovo (the district's administrative centre) by road. Korchino is the nearest rural locality.

== Notable people ==
Ignatiy Lapkin (1939–2026), religious sect founder; grew up in Poteryayevka, established religious community here, and died here.
