= Rogation days =

Days of prayer and fasting in Western Christianity

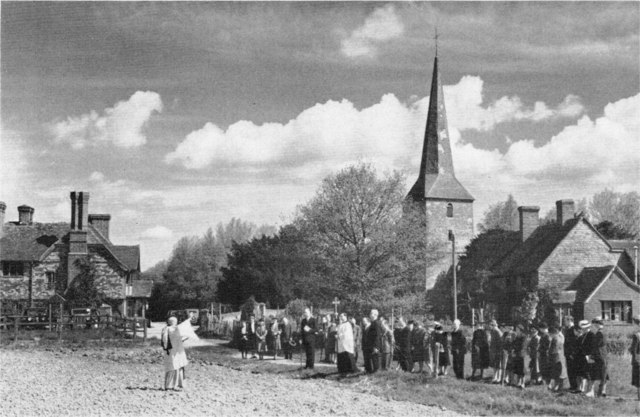
- Blessing the Fields on Rogation Sunday at Hever, Kent, in 1967
- Observed by: Christians
- Liturgical color: Violet
- Observances: Fasting and processions
- Date: 25 April (Major); Monday, Tuesday, and Wednesday preceding Ascension Thursday (Minor)
- 2025 date: 25 April; 26–28 May
- Duration: 4 days (non-consecutive)
- Frequency: annual
- Related to: Ascension Thursday

Rogation days, also known as Rogationtide, are days of prayer and fasting in Western Christianity. They are observed with processions and the Litany of the Saints. The so-called major rogation is held on 25 April; (Note: In the rare circumstance of Easter Sunday falling on 25 April, the major rogation is transferred to the Tuesday after Easter (cf. Code of Rubrics of 1960, no. 80); this will next occur in 2038.) the minor rogations are held on Monday to Wednesday preceding Ascension Thursday. In the Ambrosian Rite minor rogations were celebrated on Monday, Tuesday, and Wednesday after Ascension, preparing to celebrate Pentecost. The word rogation comes from the Latin verb rogare, meaning "to ask", which reflects the beseeching of God for the appeasement of his anger and for protection from calamities.

Rogation Sunday is celebrated on the fifth Sunday after Easter (also known as the sixth Sunday of Easter) in the Anglican tradition. This day is also known in the Lutheran tradition as Rogate Sunday.

== Christian beginnings ==
The Christian major rogation replaced a pagan Roman procession known as Robigalia, at which a dog was sacrificed to propitiate Robigus, the deity of agricultural disease. The practitioners observing Robigalia asked Robigus for protection of their crops from wheat rust.

The minor Rogation days were introduced around AD 470 by Mamertus, bishop of Vienne, and eventually adopted elsewhere. Their observance was ordered by the Council of Orleans in 511, and though the practice was spreading in Gaul during the 7th century, it was not officially adopted into the Roman rite until the reign of Pope Leo III (died 816).

The faithful typically observed the Rogation days by fasting and abstinence in preparation to celebrate the Ascension, and farmers often had their crops blessed by a priest at this time. Violet vestments are worn at the rogation litany and its associated Mass, regardless of what colour is worn at the ordinary liturgies of the day.

A common feature of Rogation days in former times was the ceremony of beating the bounds, in which a procession of parishioners, led by the minister, churchwarden, and choirboys, would proceed around the boundary of their parish and pray for its protection in the forthcoming year. This was also known in the northern parts of England as 'Gang-day' or 'gan week', after the old English name for going or walking. This was also a feature of the original Roman festival, when revellers would walk to a grove five miles from the city to perform their rites. Thomas Johnson (1633), speaking of the birch tree, mentions another name: Cross-week: "It serveth well to the decking up of houses and banquetting-rooms, for places of pleasure, and for beautifying of streets in the Crosse or Gang Week, and such like."

== In the British Isles ==
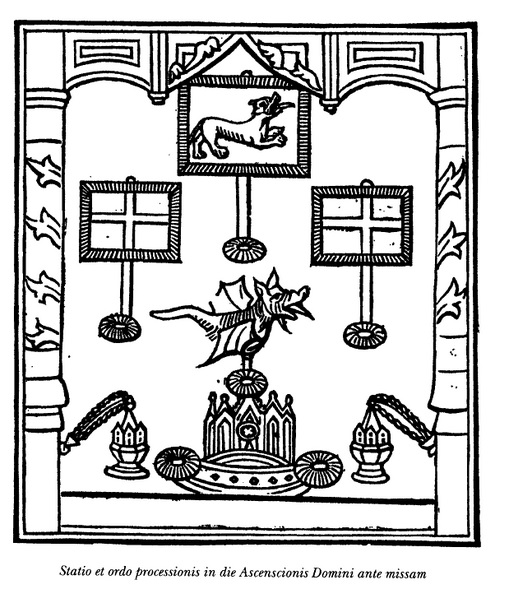
Woodcut illustration of Pre-Reformation processional order, c. early 16th century

The Rogation Day ceremonies are thought to have arrived in the British Isles in the 7th century.

The oldest known Sarum text regarding Rogation Days is dated from around 1173 to 1220. In it, celebrations in the south of England are described, in which processions were led by members of the congregation carrying banners which represented various biblical characters. At the head of the procession was the dragon, representing Pontius Pilate, which would be followed by a lion, representing Christ. After this there would be images of saints carried by the rest of the congregation. Many torches were present at each procession, weighing between 42 lb (19 kg) and 27 lbs (12 kg), which were bought by the church and parishioners jointly.

Sarum texts from the 13th and 15th centuries show that the dragon was eventually moved to the rear of the procession on the vigil of the Ascension, with the lion taking the place at the front. Illustrations of the procession from the early 16th century show that the arrangements had been changed yet again, this time also showing bearers of reliquaries and incense.

During the reign of King Henry VIII, Rogation processions were used as a way to assist crop yields, with a notable number of the celebrations taking place in 1543 when there were prolonged rains.

During the reign of King Edward VI, the Crown having taken much of the Church's holdings within the country, liturgical ceremonies were not officially condoned or recognized as an official part of worship. However, in the reign of Queen Elizabeth I the celebrations were explicitly mentioned in the royal reformation, allowing them to resume as public processions.

Rogation processions continued in the post-Reformation Church of England much as they had before, and Anglican priests were encouraged to bring their congregations together for inter-parish processions. At specific intervals, clerics were to remind their congregations to be thankful for their harvests. Psalms 103 and 104 were sung, and people were reminded of the curses the Bible ascribed to those who violated agricultural boundaries. The processions were not mandatory, but were at the discretion of the local minister, and were also ascribed more importance when a public right of way needed to be protected from agricultural or other expansion.

The marches would follow prescribed routes, with York and Coventry being unique in their following royal entries. On other routes, altars were erected at certain locations where antiphons were sung.

Any Roman Catholic imagery or icons were banned from the processions. The then Archdeacon of Essex, Edmund Grindal, besought the church explicitly to label the tradition as a perambulation of the parish boundaries (beating the bounds), further to distance it from the Catholic liturgy. In the book Second Tome of Homelys, a volume containing officially sanctioned homilies of the Elizabethan church, it was made clear that the English Rogation was to remember town and other communal boundaries in a social and historical context, with extra emphasis on the stability gained from lawful boundary lines.

For years after Rogation Days were recognized, the manner in which they were observed in reality was very different from the official decree. Even before religious sensibilities turned towards the puritanical, there were concerns about the lack of piety at such events. While it was officially ordered that the entire congregation attend, bishops began urging their priests to invite only older and more pious men. This, they believed, would stop the drunken revelry. Royal Injunctions concerning the practice were reinterpreted to restrict and regulate participants of the festivities. Robert Herrick penned a piece to capture the mood of the celebrations before their repression:

Dearest, bury me
Under that Holy-oak, or Gospel Tree
Where (though thou see'st not) thou may'st think upon
Me, when you yearly go'st Procession.

In London, Rogation Days, just like Easter or Hocktide, were times when begging was "legitimate" for the period of celebration. Though not widely celebrated in the modern Church of England, the holiday is still observed in some areas.

== In the Americas ==
=== Catholic ===
The reform of the Liturgical Calendar for Roman Catholics in 1969 delegated the establishment of Rogation Days, along with Ember Days, to the episcopal conferences. Their observance in the Latin Church subsequently declined, but the observance has revived somewhat since Pope John Paul II allowed Rogation days as a permitted, but not mandated, observance. For those Catholics who continue to celebrate Mass according to the General Roman Calendar of 1960 or earlier, the Rogation Days are still kept, unless a higher ranking feast would occur on the day.

=== Lutheran ===
The Rogation Days (known as Rogationtide) are the three days prior to Ascension Thursday. In Lutheranism, there are liturgies for "the Procession, propers, and Litany for the Days of Rogation". Fasting, as well as abstinence from meat, is enjoined during the Rogation days.

=== Anglican ===
The new, Protestant version of the Rogation days became such a fixture in Church life that the tradition was carried over to the English churches across the British Empire, including to the Americas by British colonists in Bermuda, Jamaica, Barbados, Virginia and South Carolina. Rogation days continue as an optional observance in the Episcopal Church, and in Anglican Provinces around the world. Although early Rogation celebrations were associated with rural life, agriculture and fishing, the Book of Common Prayer in many jurisdictions has been expanded to include propers for commerce and industry and the stewardship of creation, as well as a fruitful season, and rubrics were added for their use.

== See also ==
- Ember days
- Triduum
