= Karpovskaya, Yavengskoye Rural Settlement, Vozhegodsky District, Vologda Oblast =

Karpovskaya Карповская
- Village
- Location within Vologda Oblast Location within Russia
- Coordinates: 60°35′N 40°20′E
- Country: Russia
- Region: Vologda Oblast
- District: Vozhegodsky District
- Time zone: UTC+3:00

Karpovskaya (Russian: Карповская) is a rural locality (a village) in Yavengskoye Rural Settlement, Vozhegodsky District, Vologda Oblast, Russia. The population was 2 as of 2002.

== Geography ==
The distance to Vozhega is 26 km, to Baza is 10 km. Nefedovskaya, Okulovskaya, Repnyakovskaya, Lupachikha, Levkovskaya are the nearest rural localities.
