= Karpovsky, Volgograd Oblast =

Karpovsky Карповский
- Khutor
- Location within Volgograd Oblast Location within Russia
- Coordinates: 50°19′N 42°35′E
- Country: Russia
- Region: Volgograd Oblast
- District: Novoanninsky District
- Time zone: UTC+4:00

Karpovsky (Russian: Карповский) is a rural locality (a khutor) in Bocharovskoye Rural Settlement, Novoanninsky District, Volgograd Oblast, Russia. The population was 73 as of 2010.

== Geography ==
Karpovsky is located 35 km southwest of Novoanninsky (the district's administrative centre) by road. Krasny Oktyabr is the nearest rural locality.
