= Karpovsky (surname) =

Karpovsky (masculine, Russian: Карповский) or Karpovskaya (feminine, Russian: Карповская) is a Russian surname. Notable people with the surname include:

- Alex Karpovsky (born 1975), American director, actor, screenwriter, producer, and film editor
- Perl Karpovskaya, birth name of Polina Zhemchuzhina (1897–1970), Soviet politician
