= Karpovskaya, Vytegorsky District, Vologda Oblast =

Karpovskaya Карповская
- Village
- Location within Vologda Oblast Location within Russia
- Coordinates: 60°35′N 36°49′E
- Country: Russia
- Region: Vologda Oblast
- District: Vytegorsky District
- Time zone: UTC+3:00

Karpovskaya (Russian: Карповская) is a rural locality (a village) in Almozerskoye Rural Settlement, Vytegorsky District, Vologda Oblast, Russia. The population was 34 as of 2002. There are 2 streets.

== Geography ==
Karpovskaya is located 69 km southeast of Vytegra (the district's administrative centre) by road. Votolino is the nearest rural locality.
