= Karpovskaya =

Karpovskaya Карповская
- Village
- Location within Vologda Oblast Location within Russia
- Coordinates: 60°31′N 40°58′E
- Country: Russia
- Region: Vologda Oblast
- District: Vozhegodsky District
- Time zone: UTC+3:00

Karpovskaya (Russian: Карповская) is a rural locality (a village) in Nizhneslobodskoye Rural Settlement, Vozhegodsky District, Vologda Oblast, Russia. The population was 3 as of 2002.

== Geography ==
The distance to Vozhega is 55 km, to Derevenka is 6 km. Mitinskaya, Yurkovskaya, Todelovskaya are the nearest rural localities.
