= Paenitemini =

Apostolic constitution of 1966

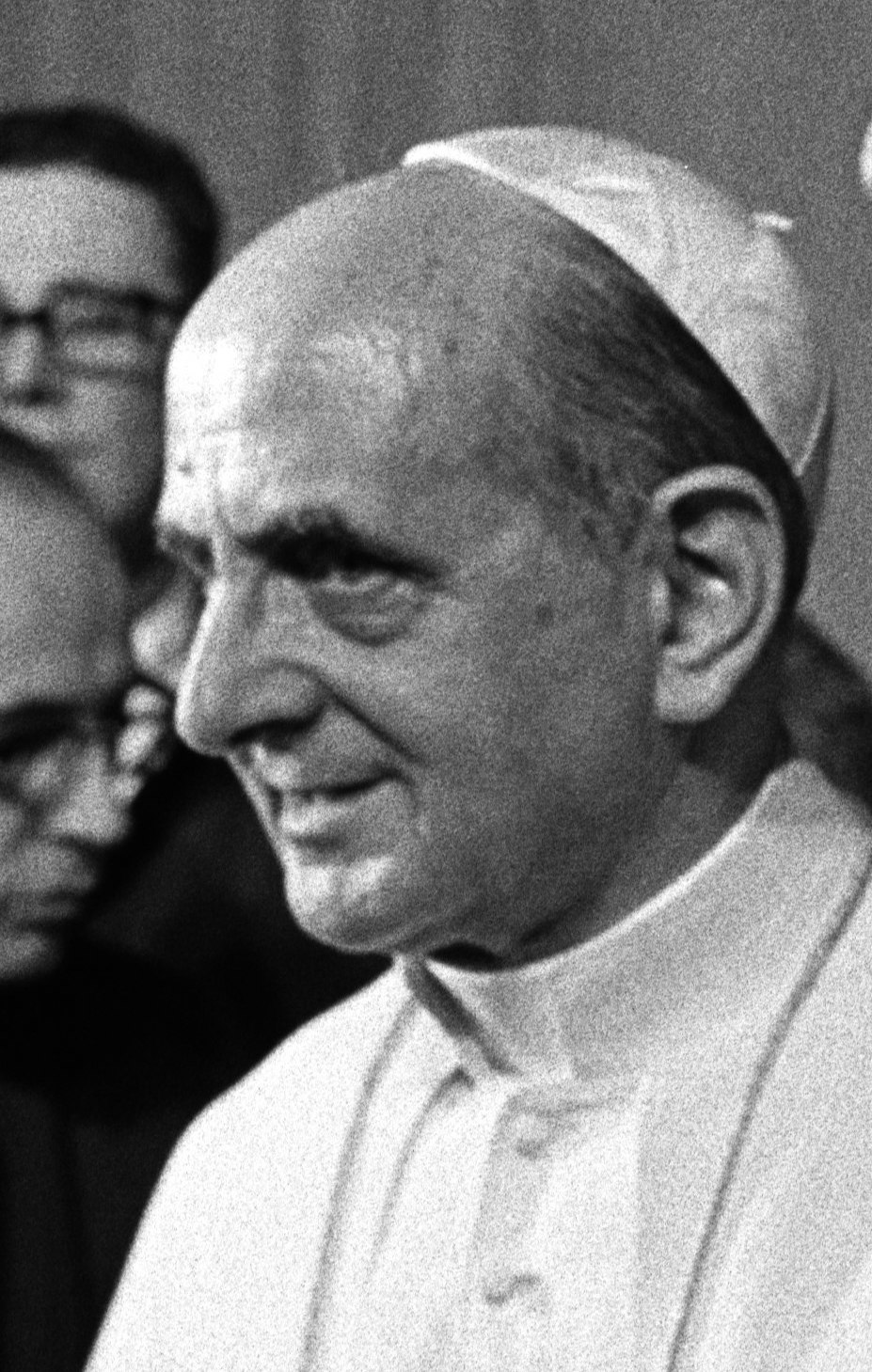
Pope Paul VI. 1967

Paenitemini is a 1966 apostolic constitution by Pope Paul VI. In Paenitemini Paul changed the strictly regulated Catholic fasting requirements. He recommended that fasting be appropriate to the local economic situation, and that all Catholics voluntarily fast and abstain. He further recommended that fasting and abstinence be replaced with prayer and works of charity "in countries where the standard of living is lower".

== Content ==
Pope Paul noted the Church's mission of showing man the right way to use earthly goods and to collaborate in the "consecration of the world." All members of the Church are called upon to participate in the work of Christ and therefore to participate also in His expiation. While he emphasized the great importance of penance as "a religious, personal act which has as its aim love and surrender to God", he observed that the Church, attentive to the signs of the times is prompted to seek, beyond fast and abstinence, new expressions more suitable for the realization of the precise goal of penitence.

"[T]he necessity of an asceticism which chastises the body and brings it into subjection is affirmed with special insistence by the example of Christ Himself. ...The intimate relationship which exists in penitence between the external act, inner conversion, prayer and works of charity is affirmed and widely developed in the liturgical texts and authors of every era.

The purpose of the new canonical laws was not to weaken the practice of penance (as actually happened), but to make it more effective. Paul stated that while preserving the custom (observed for many centuries with canonical norms) of practicing penitence also through abstinence from meat and fasting, the Church intends to ratify other forms of penitence as well, and left it to the episcopal conferences to replace the observance of fast and abstinence with exercises of prayer and works of charity where appropriate.
