= Karpovsky =

Karpovsky Карповский
- Settlement
- Location within Altai Krai Location within Russia
- Coordinates: 53°12′N 81°36′E
- Country: Russia
- Region: Altai Krai
- District: Tyumentsevsky District
- Time zone: UTC+7:00

Karpovsky (Russian: Карповский) is a rural locality (a settlement) and the administrative center of Novokarpovsky Selsoviet, Tyumentsevsky District, Altai Krai, Russia. The population was 387 as of 2013. It was founded in 1914. There are 7 streets.

== Geography ==
Karpovsky is located 21 km southeast of Tyumentsevo (the district's administrative centre) by road. Voznesensky is the nearest rural locality.

== Notable people ==
Ignatiy Lapkin (1939–2026), Soviet religious dissident and founder of a controversial Old Believer sect.
