= Office Cause =

An Office Cause (Office Jurisdiction) was a type of legal process in the English church courts. Legal action in these ecclesiastical courts was either instigated as an Instance Cause or an Office Cause. An Instance Cause was pursued by a particular plaintiff against a particular defendant whilst in an office cause the court acted as plaintiff. Office causes were usually taken to enforce attendance at Anglican church services, to discipline sexual behaviour or to discipline clergy, see Clerical Discipline. They were occasionally also instigated to pursue the payment of Tithes.
