= Ash Wednesday =

First day of Lent in Western Christianity

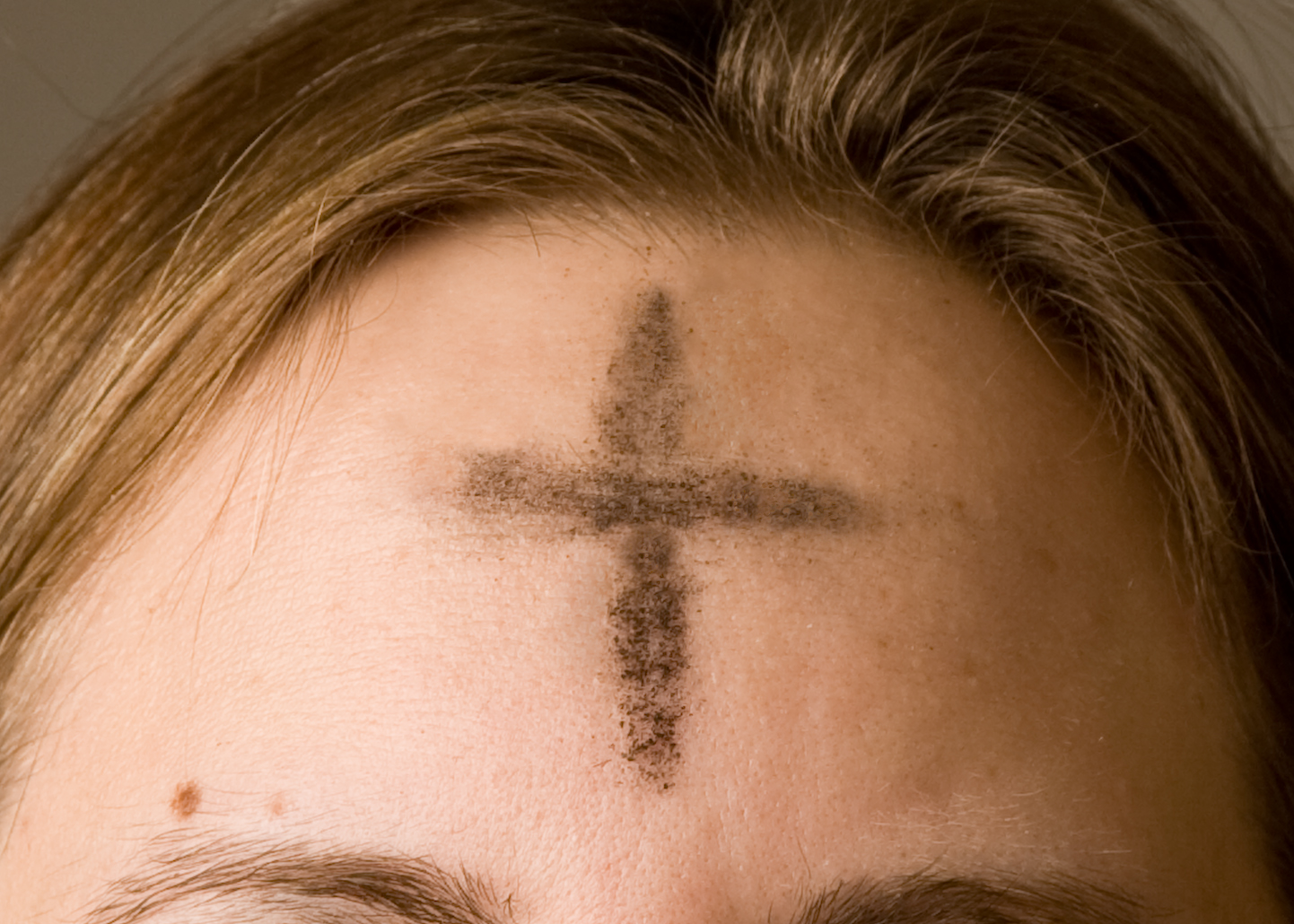
- A cross marked in ash on a worshiper's forehead
- Observed by: Many Western Christians
- Type: Christian
- Observances: Holy Mass, Divine Service, Holy Qurbana, Service of worship Fasting and abstinence Placing of ashes on the head
- Date: 46 days before Easter Sunday
- 2025 date: 5 March
- 2026 date: 18 February
- 2027 date: 10 February
- 2028 date: 1 March
- Duration: 24 hours
- Frequency: Annual
- Related to: Shrove Tuesday/Mardi Gras; Shrovetide/Carnival; Lent; Easter; Eastertide

Ash Wednesday is a holy day of prayer and fasting in many Western Christian denominations. It is preceded by Shrove Tuesday and marks the first day of Lent: the seven weeks of prayer, fasting, and almsgiving before the arrival of Easter.

Ash Wednesday is observed by Christians of the Catholic, Lutheran, Moravian, Anglican (Episcopalian), and United Protestant denominations, as well as by some churches in the Reformed (including certain Congregationalist, Continental Reformed, and Presbyterian churches), Baptist, Methodist, and Nazarene traditions.

Ash Wednesday is traditionally observed with fasting and abstinence from meat in several Christian denominations. As it is the first day of Lent, many Christians begin Ash Wednesday by marking a Lenten calendar, praying a Lenten daily devotional, and making a Lenten sacrifice that they will not partake of until the arrival of Eastertide.

Many Christians attend special Ash Wednesday church services at which churchgoers receive ash on their foreheads or the top of their heads, as the wearing of ashes has been a sign of repentance since biblical times. The imposition of ashes is typically done with the sign of the cross, signifying that the recipient is a follower of Jesus. Ash Wednesday derives its name from this practice, in which the words accompany the placement (imposition) of ashes, "Repent, and believe in the Gospel" or the dictum "Remember that you are dust, and to dust you shall return." The ashes are prepared by burning palm leaves from the previous year's Palm Sunday celebrations.

== Observing and non-observing denominations ==
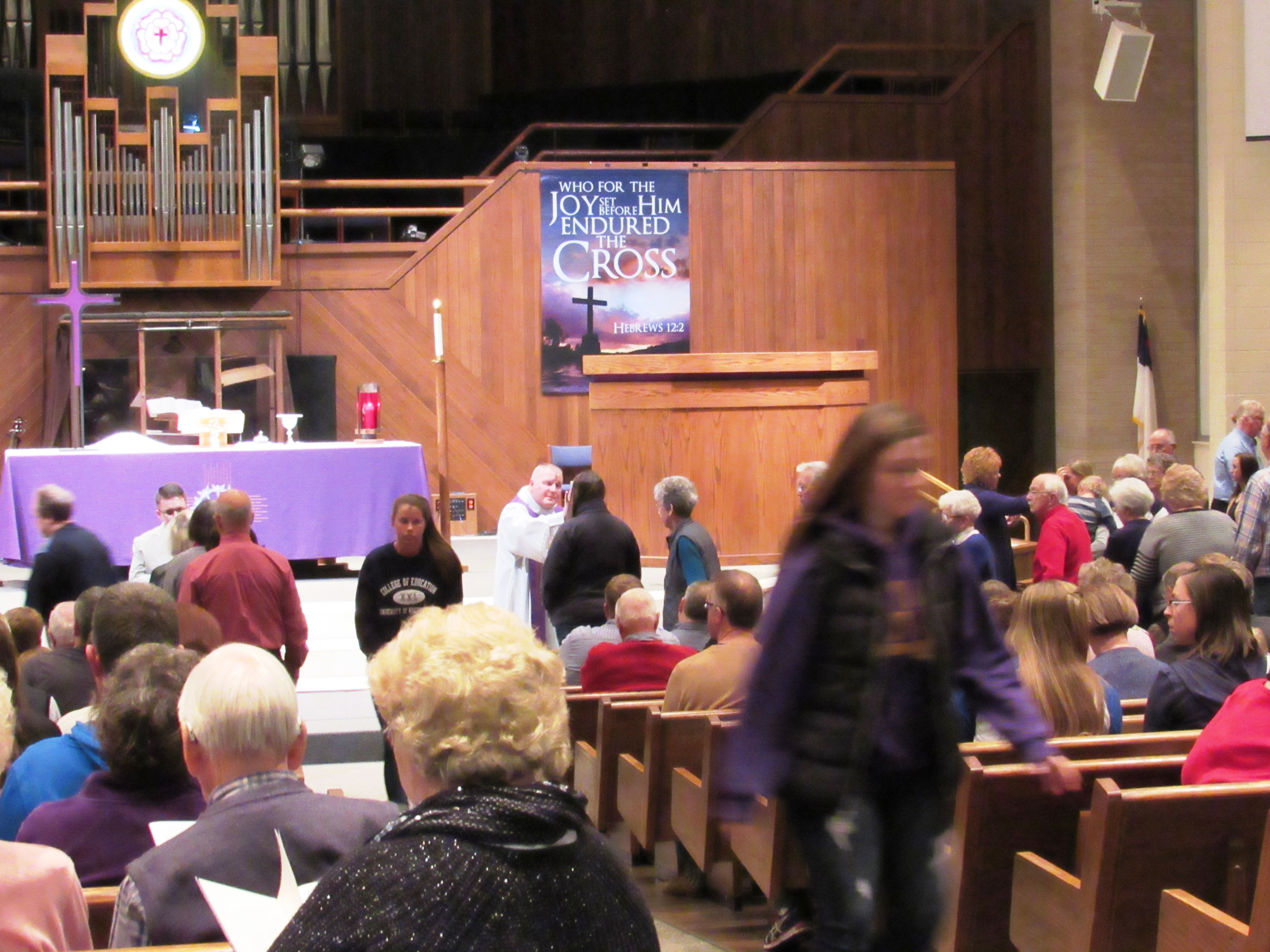
The faithful receive ashes during the celebration of the Mass in an Evangelical-Lutheran parish church.

Ash Wednesday is observed by numerous denominations within Western Christianity. Latin Church Catholics, (Note: Not all Catholics observe Ash Wednesday. Eastern Catholic Churches, which do not count Holy Week as part of Lent, begin the penitential season on Clean Monday, the Monday before Ash Wednesday, and Latin Catholics who follow the Ambrosian Rite begin it on the First Sunday in Lent. Ashes are blessed and ceremonially distributed at the start of Lent in the Latin Church, the Maronite Church, and the Syro-Malabar Catholic Church. In the Ambrosian Rite, this is done at the end of the Sunday Mass or on the following day.) Lutherans, Anglicans, and Moravians observe it. Churches in the United Protestant tradition, such as the Church of North India, Church of South India, and United Church of Canada honour Ash Wednesday too.

Some Baptists, many Methodists (including denominations aligned with the holiness movement such as Nazarenes and Wesleyans), many Radical Pietists such as the Evangelical Covenant Church, and some Conservative Anabaptists, including some Mennonites, observe Ash Wednesday. The Metropolitan Community Churches observe Ash Wednesday. Many Independent Catholics, and the Community of Christ also observe it.

The Reformed churches have historically not observed Ash Wednesday, nor Lent in general, due to the Reformed regulative principle of worship. Since the mid-twentieth century, many churches in the Reformed tradition (including certain Congregationalist, Continental Reformed, and Presbyterian churches) do observe both Ash Wednesday and Lent such as the Church of Scotland, the Protestant Church of the Netherlands, the Swiss Reformed Church, the Presbyterian Church (USA), and the United Church of Christ. The Reformed Church in America, for example, describes Ash Wednesday as a day "focused on prayer, fasting, and repentance." The liturgy for Ash Wednesday thus contains the following "Invitation to Observe a Lenten Discipline" read by the presider:

We begin this holy season by acknowledging our need for repentance and our need for the love and forgiveness shown to us in Jesus Christ. I invite you, therefore, in the name of Christ, to observe a Holy Lent, by self-examination and penitence, by prayer and fasting, by practicing works of love, and by reading and reflecting on God's Holy Word.

The Eastern Orthodox Church does not, in general, observe Ash Wednesday. Instead, Orthodox Great Lent begins on Clean Monday and followed by Sad (Sorrowful) Wednesday. There are a relatively small number of Orthodox Christians who follow the Western Rite. These do observe Ash Wednesday, although often on a different day from the previously mentioned denominations, as its date is determined from the Orthodox calculation of Pascha, which may be as much as a month later than the Western observance of Easter.

== Observances ==
=== Fasting and abstinence ===
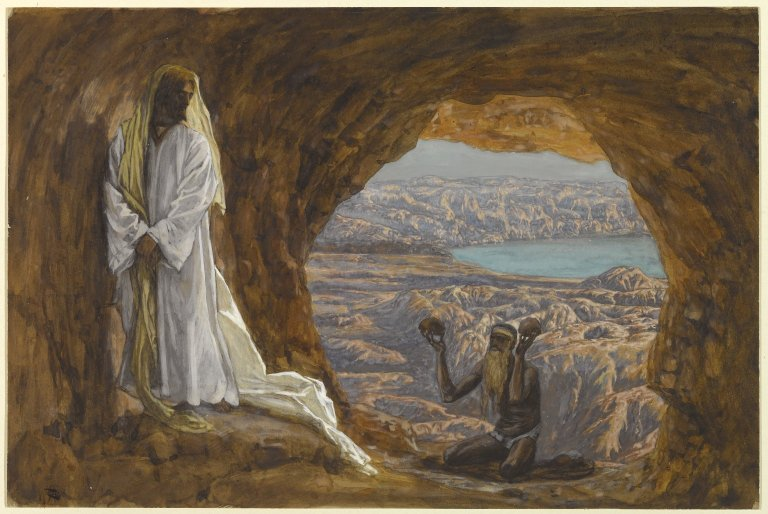
Jesus Tempted in the Wilderness (Jésus tenté dans le désert), James Tissot, Brooklyn Museum

Many Lent-observing denominations emphasize making a Lenten sacrifice, as well as fasting and abstinence during the season of Lent, particularly on Ash Wednesday. The First Council of Nicaea spoke of Lent as a period of fasting for forty days in advance of Easter, although it is unclear whether the prescribed fast applied to all Christians, or specifically to new Christians preparing to be baptized. Whatever the council's original intent, this forty-day fast came into wide practice throughout the church.

While starting a Lenten sacrifice on Ash Wednesday (e.g. giving up alcohol), it is customary to pray for strength to keep it through the whole season of Lent; many often wish others to do so as well, e.g. "May God bless your Lenten sacrifice." In many places, Christians historically abstained from food for a whole day until the evening, and at sunset, Western Christians traditionally broke the Lenten fast, which is often known as the Black Fast. In India and Pakistan, many Christians continue this practice of fasting until sunset on Ash Wednesday and Good Friday, with some fasting in this manner throughout the whole season of Lent. In India, Ash Wednesday is called व्रत विभूति (Vrat Vibhuti - meaning, "the sacred ash of the Holy Fast"). After attending a worship service, often on Wednesday evenings, it is common for Christians of various denominations that celebrate Lent to break that day's Lenten fast together through a communal Lenten supper, which is held in the church's parish hall.

Among Catholics, Ash Wednesday is observed by fasting, abstinence from meat (which begins at age 14 according to canon law 1252), and repentance. On Ash Wednesday and Good Friday, Roman Catholics between the ages of 18 and 59, whose health enables them to fast, are permitted to consume one full meal, along with two smaller meals, which together should not equal the full meal. Some Catholics will go beyond the minimum obligations put forth by the Church and undertake a complete fast or a bread and water fast until sunset. Ash Wednesday and Good Friday are also days of abstinence from meat (mammals and fowl), as are all Fridays during Lent. Some Roman Catholics continue fasting throughout Lent, as was the Church's traditional requirement, concluding only after the celebration of the Easter Vigil. Where the Ambrosian Rite is observed, the day of fasting and abstinence is postponed to the first Friday in the Ambrosian Lent, nine days later.

Several Lutheran parishes teach communicants to fast on Ash Wednesday, with some parishioners choosing to continue doing so throughout the entire season of Lent, especially on Good Friday. A Handbook for the Discipline of Lent, a Lutheran liturgical manual, recommends that the faithful "Fast on Ash Wednesday and Good Friday with only one simple meal during the day, usually without meat".

In the Church of England, and throughout much of the Worldwide Anglican Communion, the entire forty days of Lent are designated days of fasting. Fridays are designated as days of abstinence in the 1662 Book of Common Prayer. Saint Augustine's Prayer Book, a resource for Anglicans of Anglo-Catholic churchmanship, defines "Fasting" as "usually meaning not more than a light breakfast, one full meal, and one-half meal, on the forty days of Lent." The same text defines abstinence as refraining from flesh meat on all Fridays of the Church Year, except for those during Christmastide.

In the Methodist tradition, John Wesley's sermons on the topic of the Sermon on the Mount stress the importance of the Lenten fast, which begins on Ash Wednesday. The United Methodist Church therefore states that:

There is a strong biblical base for fasting, particularly during the 40 days of Lent leading to the celebration of Easter. Jesus, as part of his spiritual preparation, went into the wilderness and fasted 40 days and 40 nights, according to the Gospels.

Rev. Jacqui King, the minister of Nu Faith Community United Methodist Church in Houston explained the philosophy of fasting during Lent as "I'm not skipping a meal because in place of that meal, I'm dining with God".

Members of the Moravian Church may voluntarily fast during the season of Lent, along with making a Lenten sacrifice for the season as a form of penitence.

=== Date of Ash Wednesday ===
Ash Wednesday is always 46 days before Easter. Easter is determined as the Sunday following the first full moon that happens on or after the March equinox (which is always 21 March).

Lent is 40 days long, not including Sundays. According to the calendar, that means the season is 46 days long overall. Lent begins on Ash Wednesday and ends on Holy Saturday (in the Moravian Church, Lutheran Church, Anglican Church, Methodist Church, Reformed Churches {Continental Reformed, Presbyterian and Congregationalist}, Western Rite Orthodox Church, and United Protestant Churches) or at the start of the Easter Triduum on the evening of Maundy Thursday in the Catholic Church (though the Lenten fasting discipline ends on the evening of Holy Saturday, as with the Lutheran Churches).

=== Ashes ===
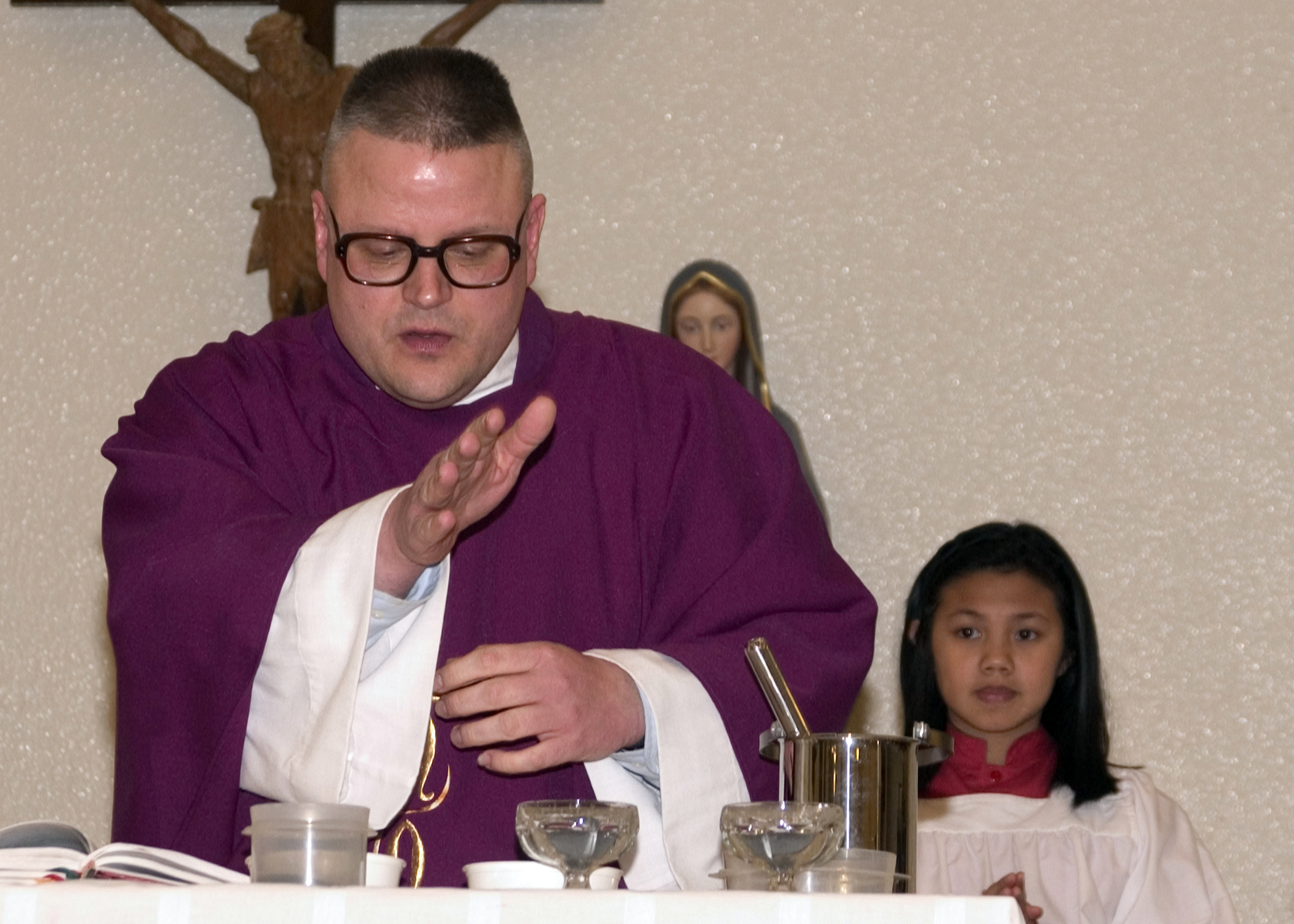
A priest blesses ashes.

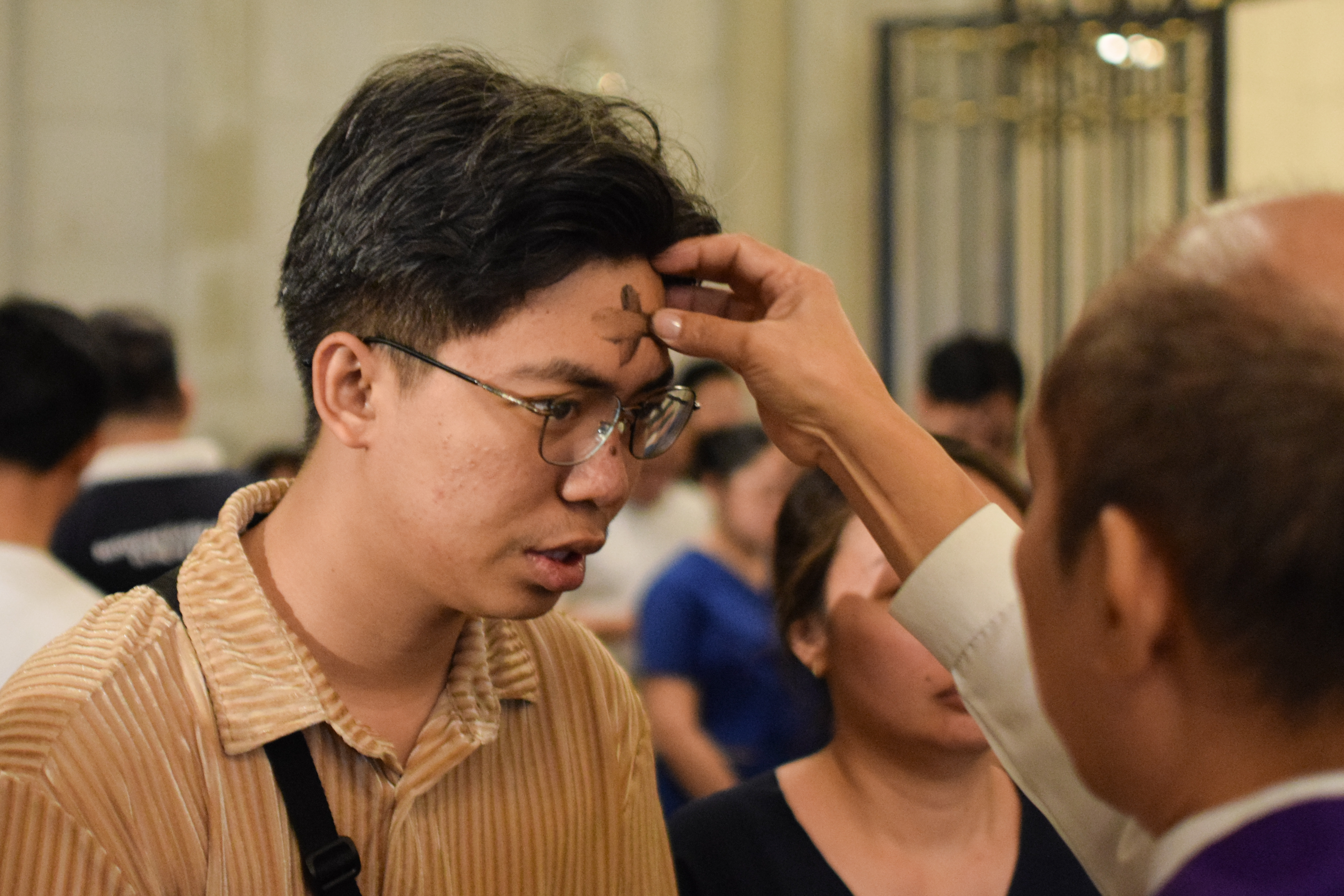
A lay minister draws a cross of ashes on a worshipper's forehead, the prevailing form in English-speaking countries.

Ashes are ceremonially placed on the heads of Christians on Ash Wednesday, either by being sprinkled over their heads or, in English-speaking countries, more often by being marked on their foreheads as a visible cross. The words (based on Genesis 3:19) used traditionally to accompany this gesture are, "Memento, homo, quia pulvis es, et in pulverem reverteris." ("Remember, man, that thou art dust, and to dust thou shalt return.") This custom is credited to Pope Gregory I the Great (c. 540 – 604), although this is probably incorrect since Ash Wednesday was not part of Lent in his time.

In the 1969 missal of the Roman Rite, an alternative formula (based on Mark 1:15) was introduced and given first place "Repent, and believe in the Gospel" and the older formula was translated as "Remember that you are dust, and to dust you shall return." The old formula, based on the words spoken to Adam and Eve after their sin, reminds worshippers of their sinfulness and mortality and thus, implicitly, of their need to repent in time.

Various manners of placing the ashes on worshippers' heads are in use within the Latin Church, the two most common being to use the ashes to make a cross on the forehead and sprinkle the ashes over the crown of the head. Originally, the ashes were strewn over men's heads, but, probably because women had their heads covered in church (based on 1 Corinthians 11), were placed on the foreheads of women. In the Catholic Church the manner of imposing ashes depends largely on local custom since no fixed rule has been laid down. In the Lutheran Churches, ashes are normatively placed on the forehead in the shape of a cross.

Although the account of Ælfric of Eynsham shows that in about the year 1000 the ashes were "strewn" on the head, the marking of the forehead is the method that now prevails in English-speaking countries and is the only one envisaged in the Occasional Offices of the Anglican Church of Papua New Guinea, a publication described as "noticeably Anglo-Catholic in character". In its ritual of "Blessing of Ashes", this states that "the ashes are blessed at the beginning of the Eucharist. After they have been blessed they are placed on the forehead of the clergy and people." The Ash Wednesday ritual of the Church of England, Mother Church of the Anglican Communion, contains "The Imposition of Ashes" in its Ash Wednesday liturgy. On Ash Wednesday, the Pope, the Bishop of Rome, traditionally takes part in a penitential procession from the Church of Saint Anselm to the Basilica of Santa Sabina, where, by the custom in Italy and many other countries, ashes are sprinkled on his head, not smudged on his forehead, and he places ashes on the heads of others in the same way.

The Anglican ritual, used in Papua New Guinea states that, after the blessing of the ashes, "the priest marks his forehead and then the foreheads of the servers and congregation who come and kneel, or stand, where they normally receive the Blessed Sacrament." The corresponding Catholic ritual in the Roman Missal for celebration within Mass merely states: "Then the Priest places ashes on the head of those present who come to him, and says to each one ..." Pre-1970 editions had much more elaborate instructions about the order in which the participants were to receive the ashes, but again without any indication of the form of placing the ashes on the head.

The 1969 revision of the Roman Rite inserted into the Mass the solemn ceremony of blessing ashes and placing them on heads, but also explicitly envisaged a similar solemn ceremony outside of Mass. The Book of Blessings contains a simple rite. While the solemn rite would normally be carried out within a church building, the simple rite could appropriately be used almost anywhere. While only a priest or deacon may bless the ashes, laypeople may do the placing of the ashes on a person's head. Even in the solemn rite, laymen or women may assist the priest in distributing the ashes. In addition, laypeople take blessed ashes left over after the collective ceremony and place them on the heads of the sick or of others who are unable to attend the blessing. (In 2014, Anglican Liverpool Cathedral likewise offered to impose ashes within the church without a solemn ceremony.)

In addition, those who attend such Catholic services, whether in a church or elsewhere, traditionally take blessed ashes home with them to place on the heads of other members of the family, and it is recommended to have envelopes available to facilitate this practice. At home the ashes are then placed with little or no ceremony.

Unlike its discipline regarding sacraments, the Catholic Church does not exclude anyone from receiving sacramentals, such as the placing of ashes on the head, even those who are not Catholics and perhaps not even baptized. Even those who have been excommunicated and are therefore forbidden to celebrate sacramentals are not forbidden to receive them. After describing the blessing, the rite of Blessing and Distribution of Ashes (within Mass) states: "Then the Priest places ashes on the heads of all those present who come to him." The Catholic Church does not limit the distribution of blessed ashes to church buildings and has suggested the holding of celebrations in shopping centers, nursing homes, and factories. Such celebrations presume preparation of an appropriate area and include readings from Scripture (at least one) and prayers, and are somewhat shorter if the ashes are already blessed.

The Catholic Church and the Methodist Church say that the ashes should be those of palm branches blessed at the previous year's Palm Sunday service, while a Church of England publication says they "may be made" from the burnt palm crosses of the previous year. These sources do not speak of adding anything to the ashes other than, for the Catholic liturgy, a sprinkling with holy water when blessing them. An Anglican website speaks of mixing the ashes with a small amount of holy water or olive oil as a fixative.

Where ashes are placed on the head by smudging the forehead with a sign of the cross, many Christians choose to keep the mark visible throughout the day. The churches have not imposed this as an obligatory rule, and the ashes may even be wiped off immediately after receiving them, but some Christian leaders, such as Lutheran pastor Richard P. Bucher and Catholic bishop Kieran Conry, recommend keeping the ashes on the forehead for the rest of the day as a public profession of the Christian faith. Morgan Guyton, a Methodist pastor, and leader in the Red-Letter Christian movement, encourages Christians to wear their ashed cross throughout the day as an exercise of religious freedom.

==== Ashes to Go ====
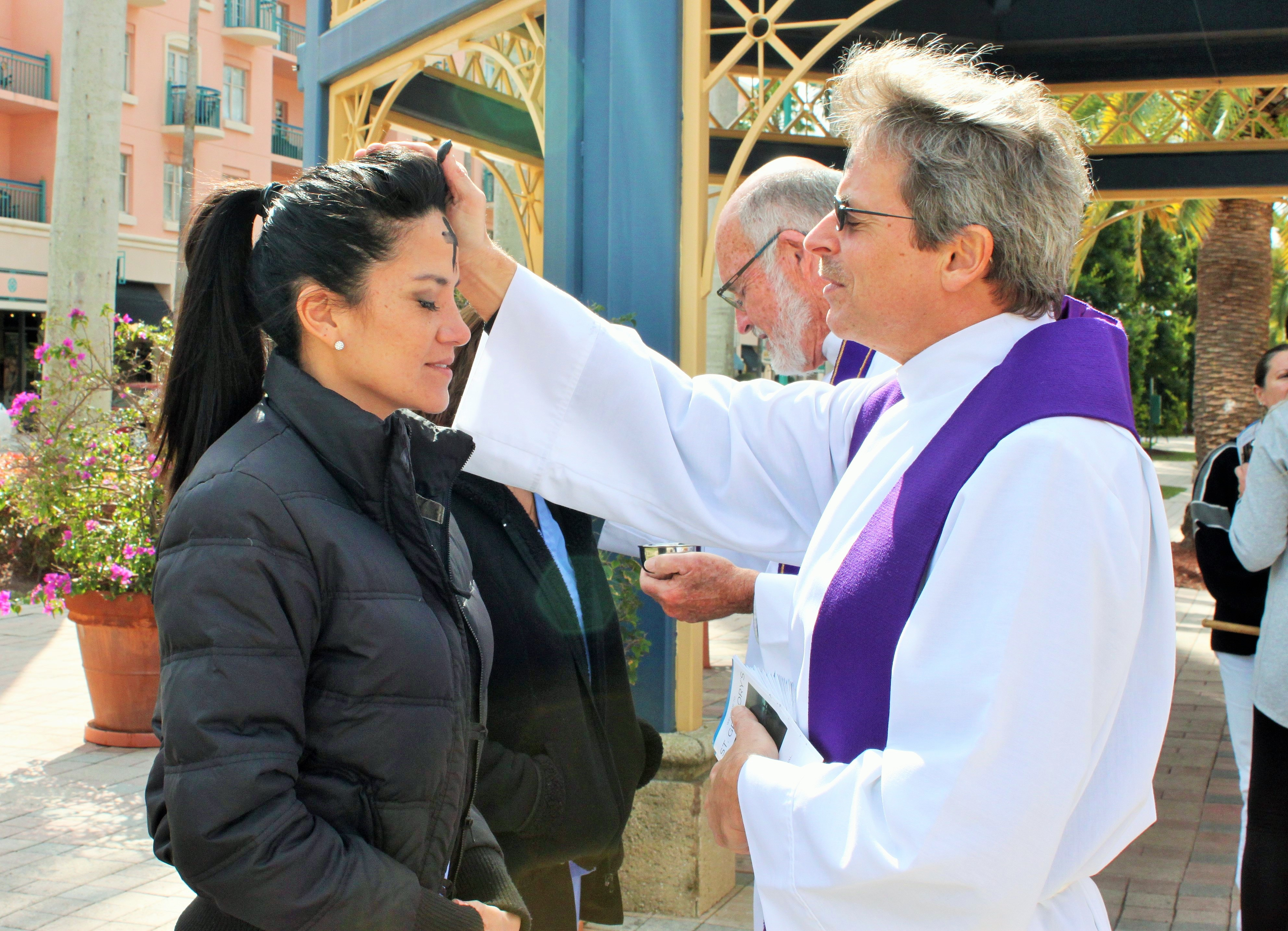
Two Anglican priests distribute ashes to passersby in the American city of Boca Raton as part of the Ashes to Go movement.

Since 2007, some members of major Christian Churches in the United States, including Anglicans, Lutherans, United Church of Christ, and Methodists, have participated in 'Ashes to Go' activities, in which clergy go outside of their churches to public places, such as city centres, sidewalks and railroad stations, to distribute ashes to passers-by, even to people waiting in their cars for a stoplight to change. The Anglican priest Emily Mellott of Calvary Church in Lombard took up the idea and turned it into a movement, stated that the practice was also an act of evangelism.

Anglicans and Catholics in parts of the United Kingdom such as Sunderland, are offering Ashes to Go together: Marc Lyden-Smith, the priest of Saint Mary's Church, stated that the ecumenical effort is a "tremendous witness in our city, with Catholics and Anglicans working together to start the season of Lent, perhaps reminding those who have fallen away from the Church, or have never been before, that the Christian faith is alive and active in Sunderland." The Catholic Student Association of Kent State University, based at the University Parish Newman Center, offered ashes to university students who were going through the Student Center of that institution in 2012, and Douglas Clark of St. Matthew's Roman Catholic Church in Statesboro, among others, have participated in Ashes to Go.

On Ash Wednesday 2017, Father Paddy Mooney, the priest of St Patrick's Roman Catholic Church in the Irish town of Glenamaddy, set up an Ashes to Go station through which commuters could drive and receive ashes from their car; the parish church also had "drive-through prayers during Lent with people submitting requests into a box left in the church grounds without having to leave their car". Reverend Trey Hall, pastor of Urban Village United Methodist Church, stated that when his local church offered ashes in Chicago "nearly 300 people received ashes – including two people who were waiting in their car for a stoplight to change."

In 2013, churches not only in the United States but also at least one church each in the United Kingdom, Canada, and South Africa, participated in Ashes to Go. Outside of their church building, Saint Stephen Martyr Lutheran Church in Canton offered Ashes to Go for "believers whose schedules make it difficult to attend a traditional service" in 2016. In the United States itself 34 states and the District of Columbia had at least one church taking part. Most of these churches (parishes) were Episcopal, but there were also several Methodist churches, as well as Presbyterian and Catholic churches.

=== Commination Office ===
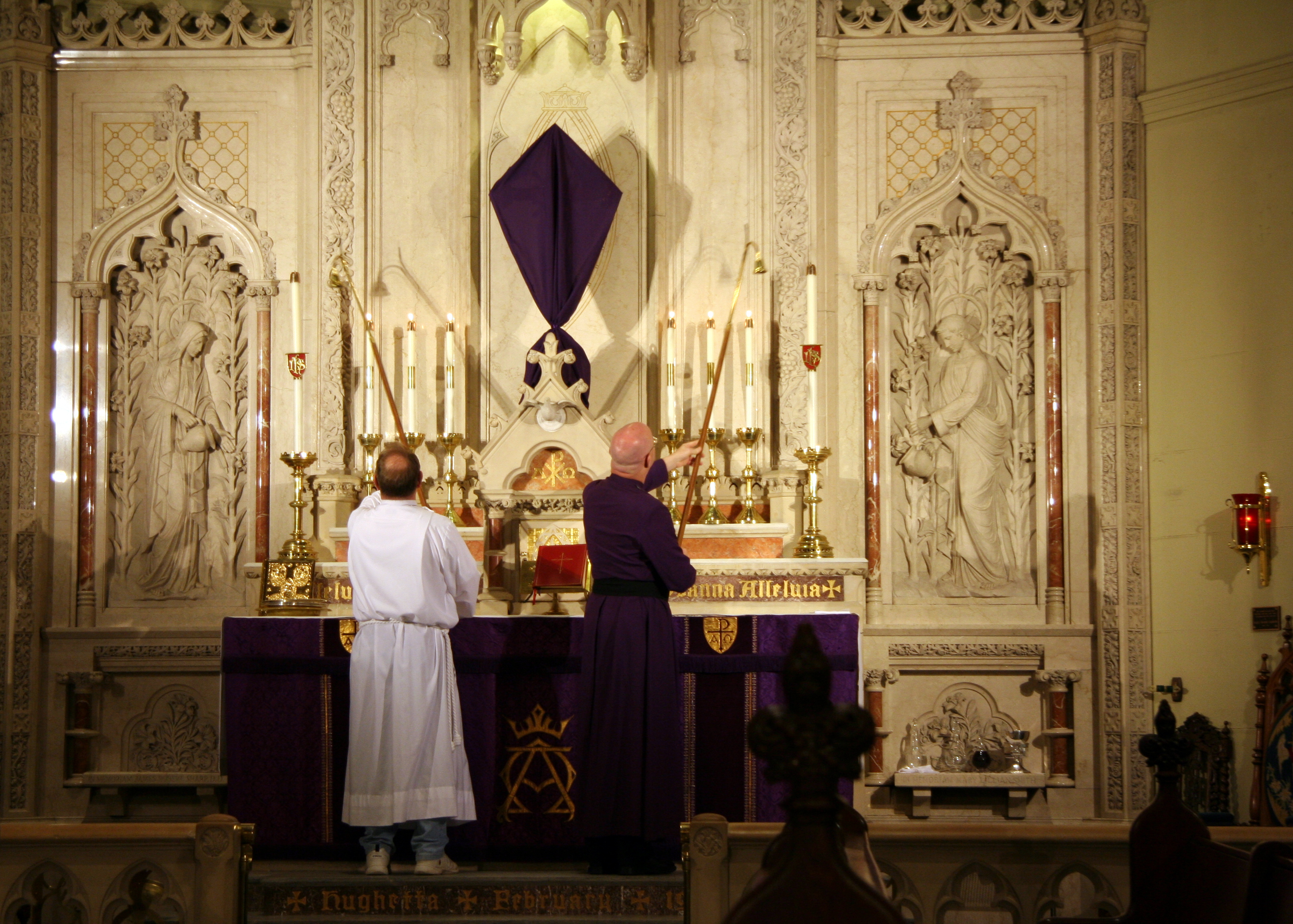
St. Mary's Episcopal Cathedral in Memphis, Tennessee, on Ash Wednesday 2011. The veiled altar cross and purple paraments are customary during Lent.

Robin Knowles Wallace states that the traditional Ash Wednesday church service includes Psalm 51 (the Miserere), prayers of confession, and the sign of ashes. No single one of the traditional services contains all of these elements. The Anglican church's traditional Ash Wednesday service, titled A Commination, contains the first two elements, but not the third. On the other hand, the Catholic Church's traditional service has the blessing and distribution of ashes but, while prayers of confession and recitation of Psalm 51 (the first psalm at Lauds on all penitential days, including Ash Wednesday) are a part of its general traditional Ash Wednesday liturgy, they are not associated specifically with the rite of blessing the ashes.

The rite of blessing has acquired an untraditionally weak association with that particular psalm only since 1970 when it was inserted into the celebration of Mass, at which a few verses of Psalm 51 are used as a responsorial psalm. Where the traditional Gregorian Chants are still used, the psalm continues to enjoy a prominent place in the ceremony.

In the mid-16th century, the first Book of Common Prayer removed the ceremony of the ashes from the liturgy of the Church of England and replaced it with what would later be called the Commination Office. In that 1549 edition, the rite was headed: "The First Day of Lent: Commonly Called Ash-Wednesday". The ashes ceremony was not forbidden, but was not included in the church's official liturgy. Its place was taken by reading biblical curses of God against sinners, to each of which the people were directed to respond with Amen.

The text of the "Commination or Denouncing of God's Anger and Judgments against Sinners" begins: "In the primitive Church there was a godly discipline, that, at the beginning of Lent, such persons as stood convicted of notorious sin were put to open penance, and punished in this world, that their souls might be saved in the day of the Lord; and that others, admonished by their example, might be the more afraid to offend. Instead whereof, until the said discipline may be restored, (which is much to be wished,) it is thought good that at this time (in the presence of you all) should be read the general sentences of God's cursing against impenitent sinners". In line with this, Joseph Hooper Maude wrote that the establishment of The Commination was due to a desire of the reformers "to restore the primitive practice of public penance in church". He further stated that "the sentences of the greater excommunication" within The Commination corresponded to those used in the ancient Church.

The Anglican Church's Ash Wednesday liturgy, he wrote, also traditionally included the Miserere, which, along with "what follows" in the rest of the service (lesser Litany, Lord's Prayer, three prayers for pardon and final blessing), "was taken from the Sarum services for Ash Wednesday". From the Sarum Rite practice in England the service took Psalm 51 and some prayers that in the Sarum Missal accompanied the blessing and distribution of ashes. In the Sarum Rite, the Miserere psalm was one of the seven penitential psalms that were recited at the beginning of the ceremony. In the 20th century, the Episcopal Church introduced three prayers from the Sarum Rite and omitted the Commination Office from its liturgy.

=== Low church ceremonies ===
In some of the low church traditions, other practices are sometimes added or substituted, as other ways of symbolizing the confession and penitence of the day. For example, in one common variation, small cards are distributed to the congregation on which people are invited to write a sin they wish to confess. These small cards are brought forth to the altar table where they are burned.

=== Regional customs ===
In the Victorian era, theatres refrained from presenting costumed shows on Ash Wednesday, so they provided other entertainment, as mandated by the Church of England (Anglican Church).

In Iceland, children "pin small bags of ashes on the back of some unsuspecting person", dress up in costumes, and sing songs for candy.

In Hungary if someone in the village didn't receive ash, they "shared their blessing" by rubbing their foreheads together, and the Csángó people of Moldova even cover the pots with ashes to bring good luck. An interesting related tradition is that since dancing was forbidden, children played dancing games (like ulicskázás and hajujvárazás) and ball games (as mancsozás, csülgözés, kutyasatú and sajbózás), all specific to Hungary.

== Biblical significance of ashes ==
Ashes were used in ancient times to express grief or repentance.

The biblical text of Jonah 3 holds that after the prophet Jonah warned those inhabiting Nineveh for the second time, its inhabitants repented, fasting from food and water, along with wearing ashes and sackcloth. For this reason, God spared the Ninevites according to the text (cf. Fast of Nineveh).

When Tamar was raped by her half-brother, "she sprinkled ashes on her head, tore her robe, and with her face buried in her hands went away crying" (2 Samuel 13:19). The gesture was also used to express sorrow for sins and faults. Ashes could be symbolic of the old sinful self dying and returning to the dust. In Job 42:5–6, Job says to God: "I have heard of thee by the hearing of the ear: but now mine eye seeth thee. Wherefore I abhor myself, and repent in dust and ashes."

The prophet Jeremiah calls for repentance by saying: "O daughter of my people, gird on sackcloth, roll in the ashes" (Jer 6:26). The prophet Daniel recounted pleading to God: "I turned to the Lord God, pleading in earnest prayer, with fasting, sackcloth, and ashes" (Daniel 9:3). Just before the New Testament period, the rebels fighting for Jewish independence, the Maccabees, prepared for battle using ashes: "That day they fasted and wore sackcloth; they sprinkled ashes on their heads and tore their clothes" (1 Maccabees 3:47; see also 4:39).

Examples of the practice among Jews are found in several other books of the Bible, including Numbers 19:9, 19:17, Jonah 3:6, Book of Esther 4:1, and Hebrews 9:13. Jesus is quoted as speaking of the practice in Matthew 11:21 and Luke 10:13: "If the mighty works done in you had been done in Tyre and Sidon, they would have repented long ago (sitting) in sackcloth and ashes."

== Christian use of ashes ==
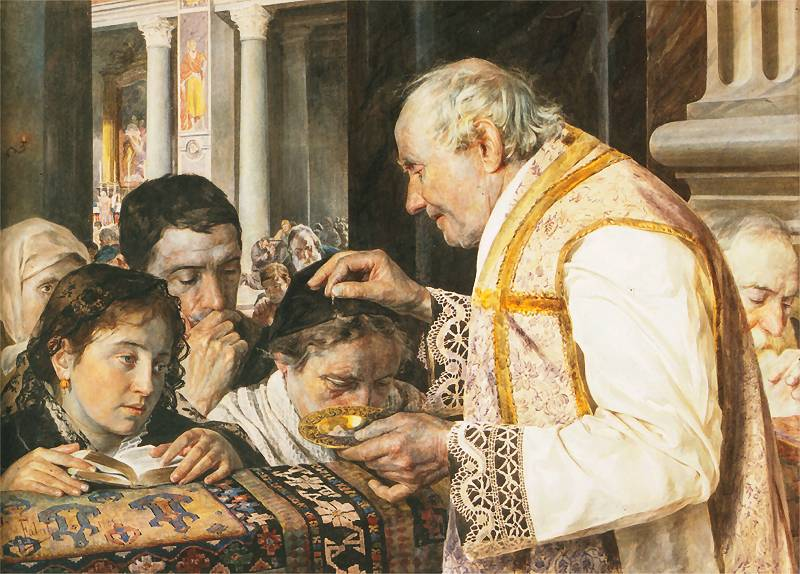
An 1881 Polish painting of a Roman Catholic priest sprinkling ashes on the heads of worshippers, the method prevailing in Italy, Poland, Spain, and parts of Latin America.

Christians continued the practice of using ashes as an external sign of repentance. Tertullian (c. 160 – c. 225) said that confession of sin should be accompanied by lying in sackcloth and ashes. The historian Eusebius (c. 260/265 – 339/340) recounts how a repentant apostate covered himself with ashes when begging Pope Zephyrinus to readmit him to communion.

John W. Fenton writes that "by the end of the 10th century, it was customary in Western Europe (but not yet in Rome) for all the faithful to receive ashes on the first day of the Lenten fast. In 1091, this custom was then ordered by Pope Urban II at the council of Benevento to be extended to the church in Rome. Not long after that, the name of the day was referred to in the liturgical books as "Feria Quarta Cinerum" (i.e., Ash Wednesday)."

The public penance that grave sinners underwent before being admitted to Holy Communion just before Easter lasted throughout Lent, on the first day of which they were sprinkled with ashes and dressed in sackcloth. When, towards the end of the first millennium, the discipline of public penance was dropped, the beginning of Lent, seen as a general penitential season, was marked by sprinkling ashes on the heads of all. This practice is found in the Gregorian Sacramentary of the late 8th century. About two centuries later, Ælfric of Eynsham, an Anglo-Saxon abbot, wrote of the rite of strewing ashes on heads at the start of Lent.

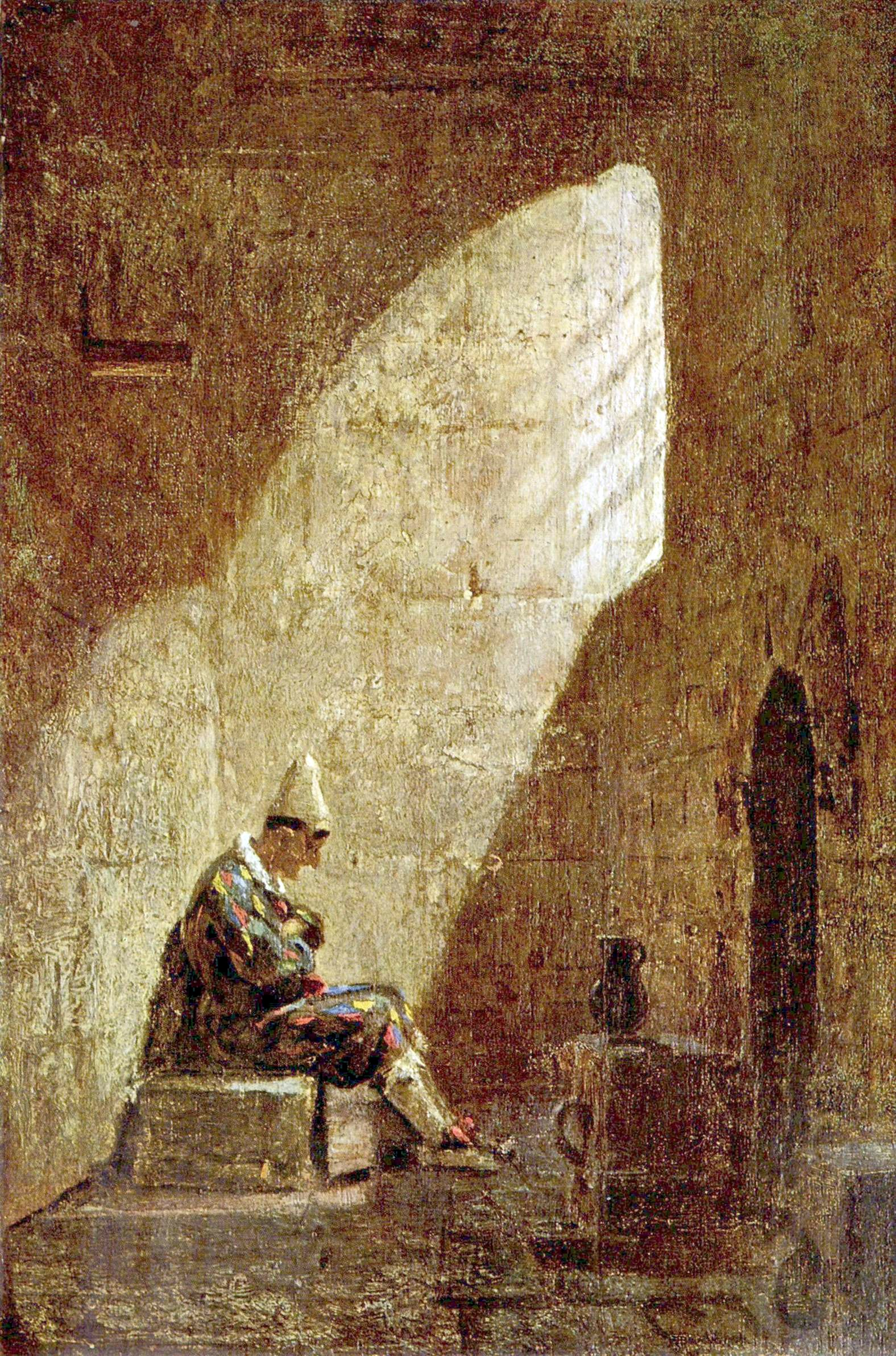
Ash Wednesday by Carl Spitzweg: the end of Carnival

The article on Ash Wednesday in the Encyclopædia Britannica Eleventh Edition states that, after the Protestant Reformation, the ashes ceremony was not forbidden in the Church of England; liturgical scholar Blair Meeks notes that the Lutheran and Anglican denominations "never lapsed in this observance". It was even prescribed under King Henry VIII in 1538 and under King Edward VI in 1550, but it fell out of use in many areas after 1600. In 1536, the Ten Articles issued by authority of Henry VIII commended "the observance of various rites and ceremonies as good and laudable, such as clerical vestments, a sprinkling of holy water, bearing of candles on Candlemas-day, giving of ashes on Ash-Wednesday".

After Henry's death in January 1547, Thomas Cranmer, within the same year, "procured an order from the Council to forbid the carrying of candles on Candlemas-day, and the use of ashes on Ash-Wednesday, and of palms on Palm-Sunday, as superstitious ceremonies", an order that was issued only for the ecclesiastical province of Canterbury, of which Cranmer was archbishop. The Church Cyclopædia states that the "English office had adapted the very old Salisbury service for Ash-Wednesday, prefacing it with an address and a recital of the curses of Mount Ebal, and then with an exhortation uses the older service very nearly as it stood."

The new Commination Office had no blessing of ashes and therefore, in England as a whole, "soon after the Reformation, the use of ashes was discontinued as a 'vain show' and Ash Wednesday then became only a day of marked solemnity, with a memorial of its original character in a reading of the curses denounced against impenitent sinners". The Protestant Episcopal Church in the United States of America, in the 19th century, observed Ash Wednesday: "as a day of fasting and humiliation, wherein we are publicly to confess our sins, meekly to implore God's mercy and forgiveness, and humbly to intercede for the continuance of his favour". In the 20th century, the Book of Common Prayer provided prayers for the imposition of ashes.

Monte Canfield and Blair Meeks state that after the Protestant Reformation, Lutherans and Anglicans kept the rite of blessing and distributing ashes to the faithful on Ash Wednesday, and that the Protestant denominations that did not keep it, such as the Methodists, encouraged its use "during and after the ecumenical era that resulted in the Vatican II proclamations". Jack Kingsbury and Russell F. Anderson likewise state that the practice was continued among some Lutherans and Anglicans.

As part of the liturgical revival ushered in by the ecumenical movement, the practice was encouraged in Protestant churches, including the Methodist Church. It has also been adopted by Anabaptist and Reformed churches and some less liturgical denominations.

The Eastern Orthodox churches generally do not observe Ash Wednesday, although in recent times, the creation of the Antiochian Western Rite Vicariate has led to the observance of Ash Wednesday among Western Orthodox parishes. In this tradition, ashes "may be distributed outside of the mass or any liturgical service" although "commonly the faithful receive their ashes immediately before the Ash Wednesday mass". In Orthodoxy, historically, "serious public sinners in the East also donned sackcloth, including those who made the Great Fast a major theme of their entire lives such as hermits and desert-dwellers." Byzantine Rite Catholics, although in the United States use "the same Gregorian calendar as the Roman Catholic rite", do not practice the distribution of ashes as it is "not part of their ancient tradition".

In the Ambrosian Rite, ashes are blessed and placed on the heads of the faithful not on the day that elsewhere is called Ash Wednesday, but at the end of Mass on the following Sunday, which in that rite inaugurates Lent, with the fast traditionally beginning on Monday, the first weekday of the Ambrosian Lent.

== Dates ==
Ash Wednesday and other named days and day ranges around Lent and Easter in Western Christianity, with the fasting days of Lent numbered

Ash Wednesday is exactly 46 days before Easter Sunday, a moveable feast based on the cycles of the moon. The earliest date Ash Wednesday can occur is 4 February (which is only possible during a common year with Easter Sunday on 22 March), which happened in 1598, 1693, 1761, and 1818 and will next occur in 2285. The latest date Ash Wednesday can occur is 10 March (when Easter Sunday falls on 25 April) which occurred in 1666, 1734, 1886 and 1943 and will next occur in 2038.

Since the introduction of the Gregorian calendar in 1582, Ash Wednesday has never occurred on a Leap Year Day (29 February) but it will do so for the first time in 2096. The only other years of the third millennium that will have Ash Wednesday on 29 February are 2468, 2688, 2840, and 2992. (Ash Wednesday falls on 29 February if and only if Easter is on 15 April in a leap year.) Also, there are certain times that Ash Wednesday coincides with Valentine's Day (14 February), which occurred in 1923, 1934, 1945, 2018, 2024, and will next occur in 2029.

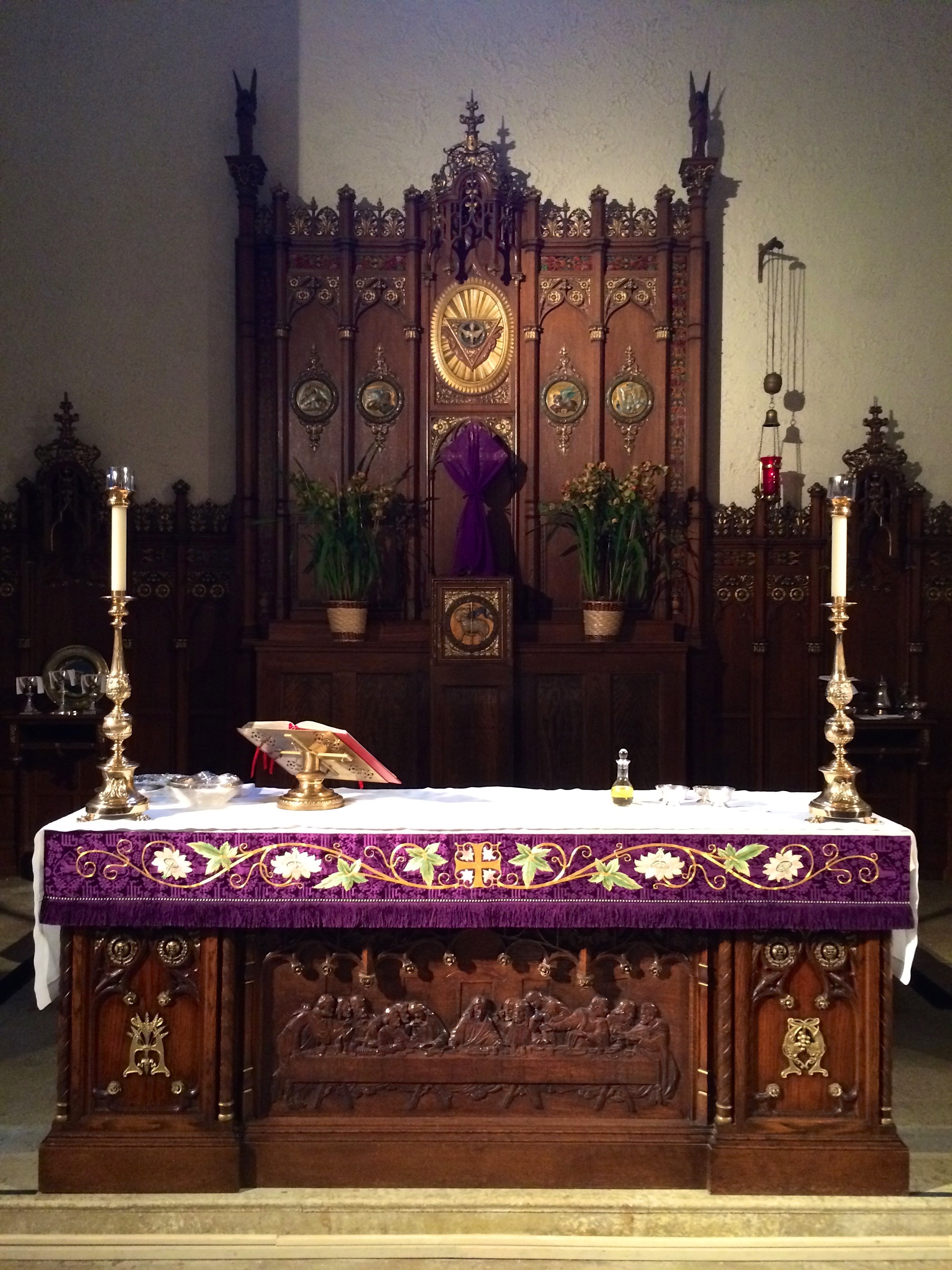
The chancel of a church on Ash Wednesday 2015 (the veiled altar cross and purple paraments are customary during Lent)

Ash Wednesday marks the start of a 40-day period which is an allusion to the separation of Jesus in the desert to fast and pray. During this time he was tempted. Matthew 4:1–11, Mark 1:12–13, and Luke 4:1–13. While not specifically instituted in the Bible text, the 40 days of fast and pray is also analogous to the 40 days during which Moses repented and fasted in response to the making of the Golden calf (Exo. 34:27–28). (Jews today follow 40 days of repenting in preparation for and during the High Holy Days from Rosh Chodesh Elul to Yom Kippur.)

== Gallery ==
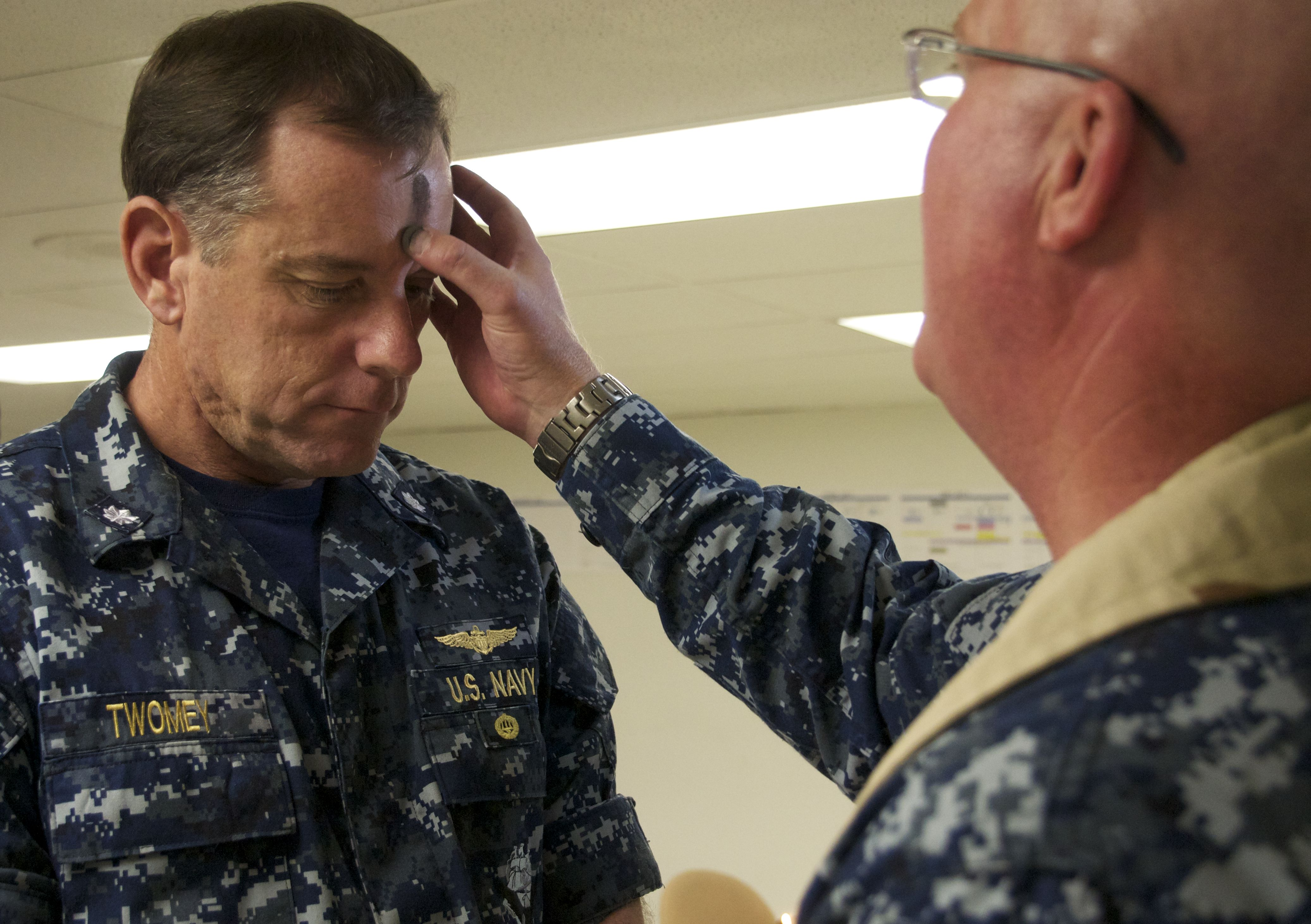
A Naval air officer receives ashes from a military chaplain aboard a U.S. Navy ship, 2011.

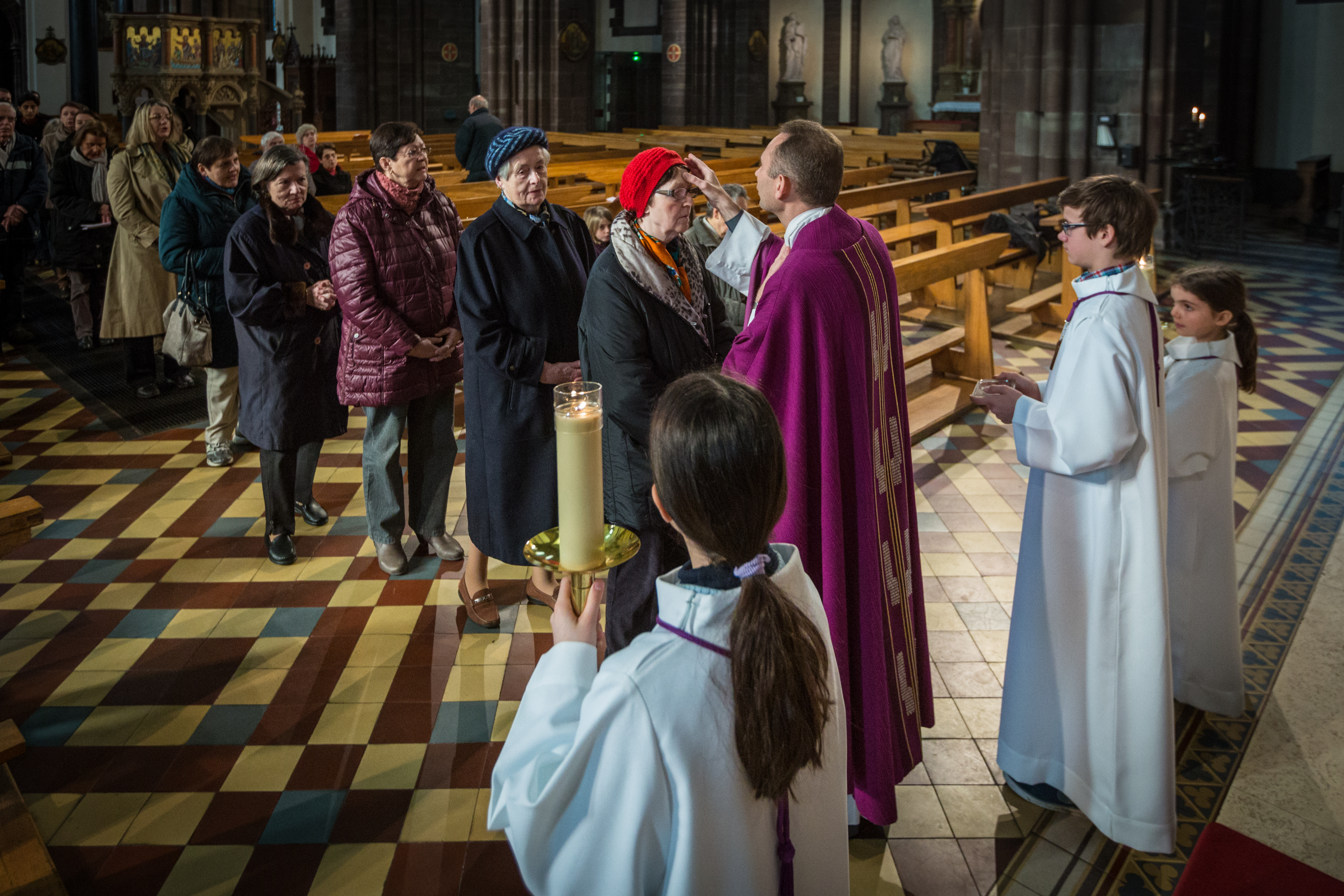
Imposition of ashes at Saint-Pierre-le-Jeune Catholic Church, Strasbourg, 2014

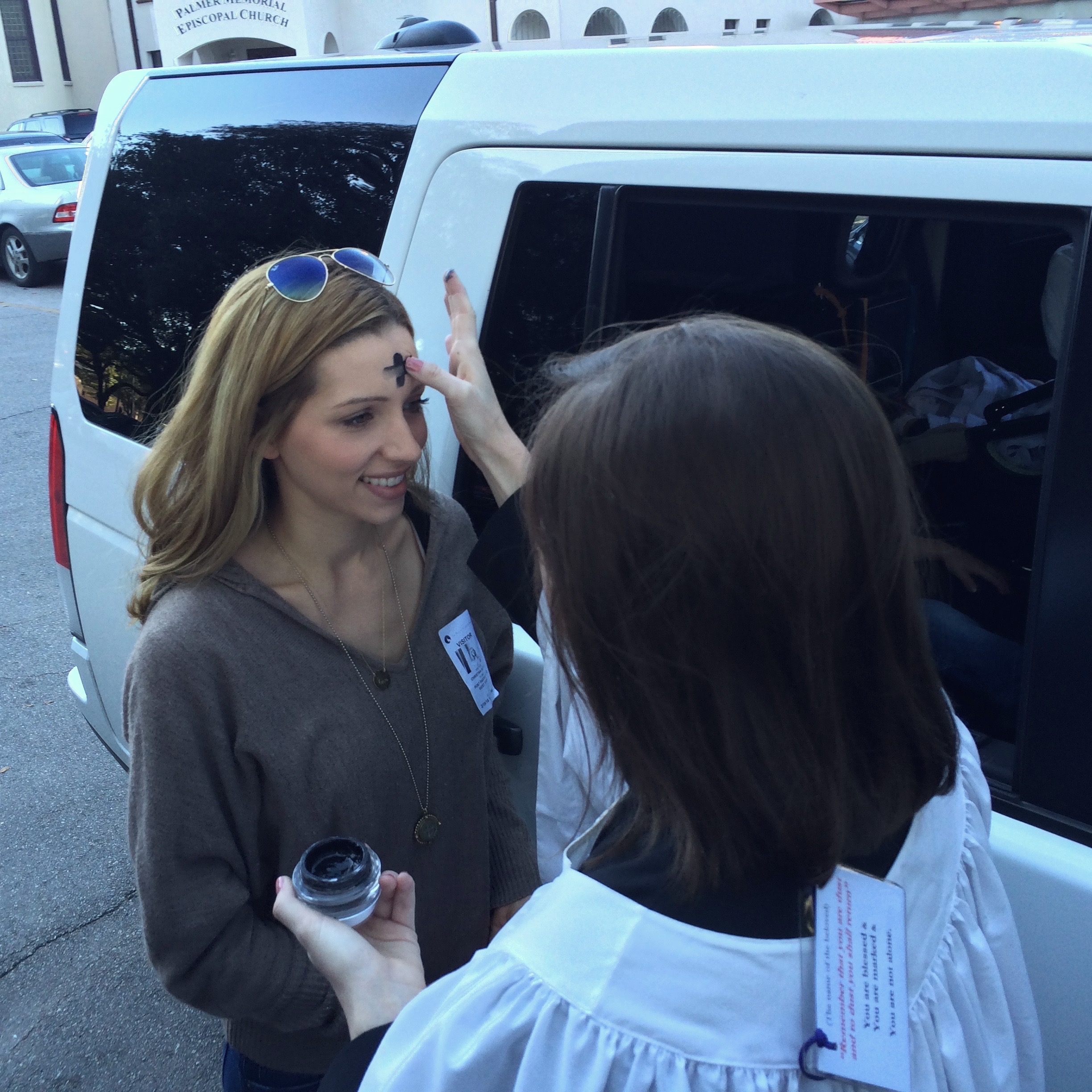
A woman receives a cross of ashes on Ash Wednesday outside an Episcopal church, 2015.

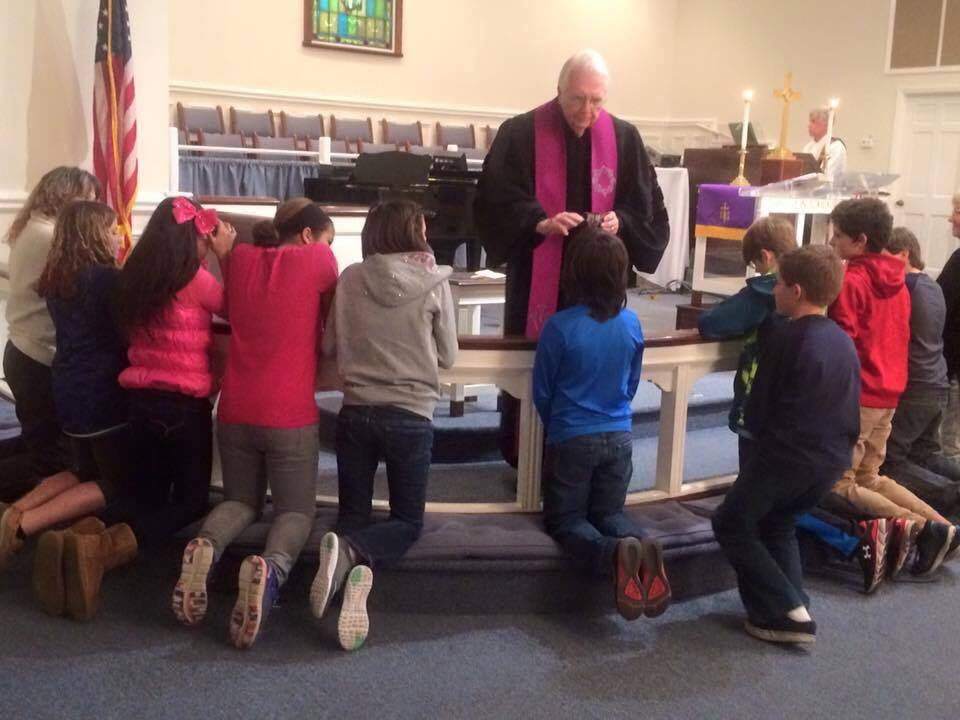
A Methodist pastor distributing ashes to confirmands kneeling at the chancel rails, 2016

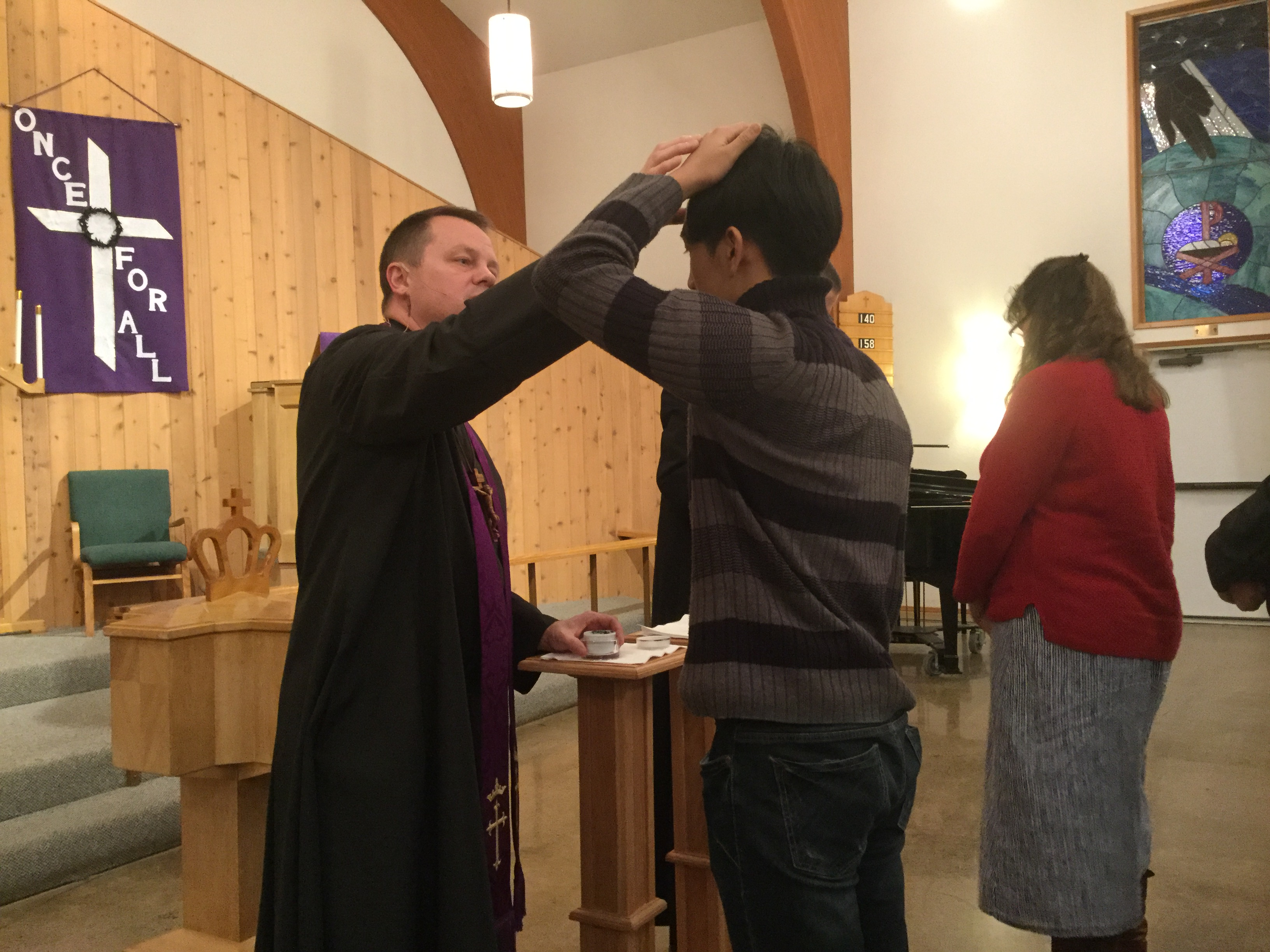
A Lutheran pastor distributes ashes to a communicant during a Divine Service, 2017.

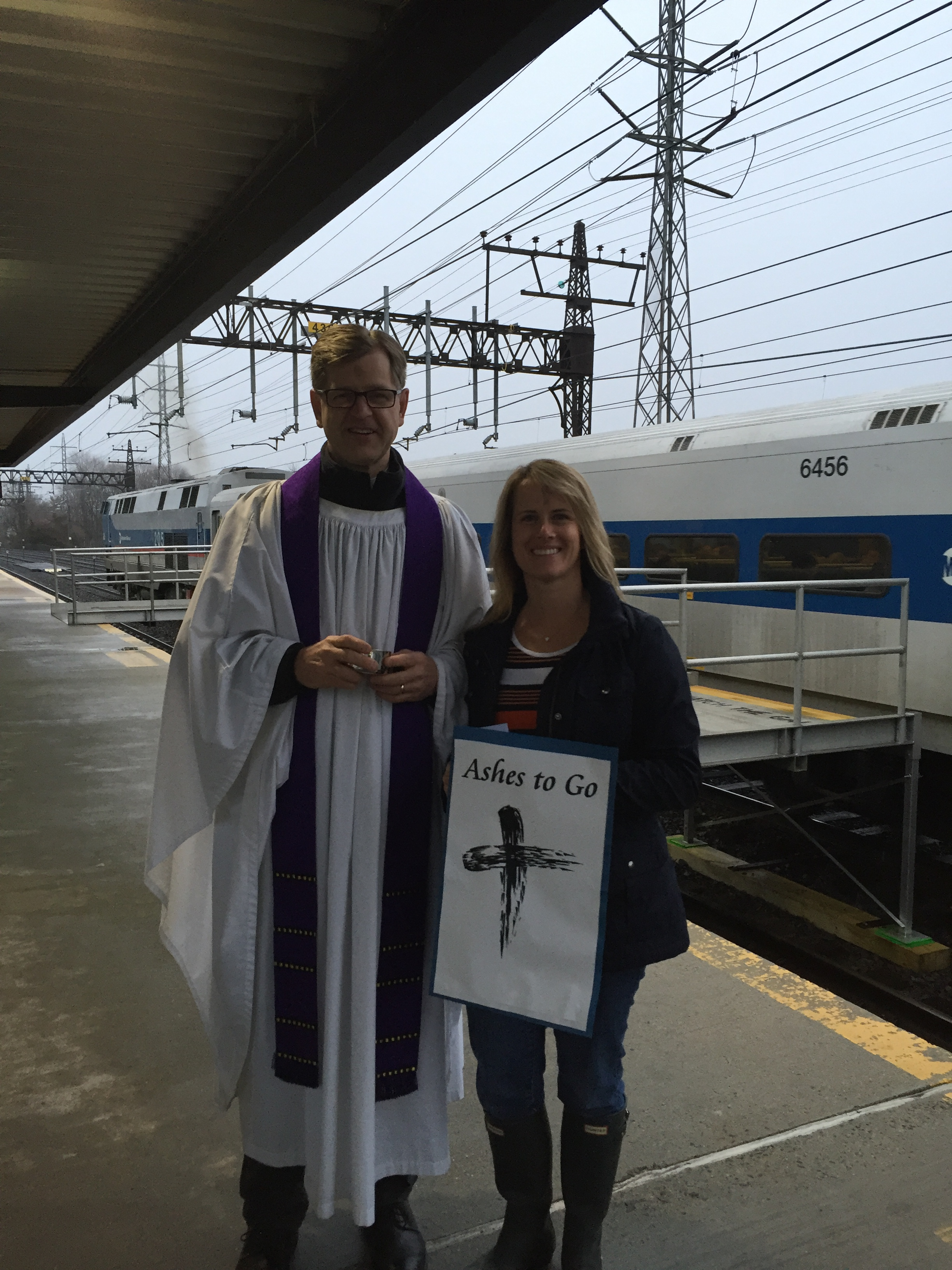
A priest has an "Ashes to Go" station for commuters at a train station.

== National No Smoking Day ==
In the Republic of Ireland, Ash Wednesday is National No Smoking Day. The date was chosen because quitting smoking ties in with giving up a luxury for Lent, and because of the link between ash and smoking. In the United Kingdom, No Smoking Day was held for the first time on Ash Wednesday in 1984 but is now fixed as the second Wednesday in March.
