= Godly discipline =

Godly discipline is a term used by early modern Protestant reformers, particularly Puritans, to describe the regulation of personal and communal behavior according to biblical standards, often enforced through both civil and church authorities. This concept could often be in conflict with radical protestant views on individual spirituality.

== See also ==
- Reformation of Manners
- Cambridge Platform
- Clerical Discipline
