= Instance Cause =

Church of England legal process

An Instance Cause was a type of legal process in the English church courts. Legal action in these ecclesiastical courts was either instigated as an Instance Cause or an Office Cause (Office Jurisdiction). An Instance Cause was pursued by a particular plaintiff against a particular defendant whilst in an Office Cause the court acted as plaintiff. Instance causes were taken between parties in marital disputes, or between members of a community in pew disputes or defamation litigation.
