= Twelve Articles (disambiguation) =

The Twelve Articles were part of the peasants' demands during the German Peasants' War (1524–1524).

Twelve Articles may also refer to:

- Twelve Articles of the Apostles' Creed
- Twelve Articles of the Bill of Rights for approval while developing the United States Constitution during September 1789
- Twelve Articles of the 1577 Formula of Concord
- Twelve Articles of Faith, of the General Association of Baptists
- Twelve articles of accusation, against Joan of Arc
