= Clerical Discipline =

Clerical Discipline was an incentive by church authorities to regulate the behaviour of local clergy in early modern England.

Following the sixteenth-century religious reformations, see Reformation, there was an increasing concern over the educational background and behaviour of local clergy in England. Many in authority held the view that the Catholic Church had left an inheritance of ministers that shared far too many cultural traits with their parishioners and were, therefore, unfit to provide pastoral care and spiritual instruction in a godly community.

The records of church courts document much litigation taken to reprimand drunken or sexually immoral priests. Depositions of many witnesses provide lurid detail of the alleged offences. These actions, which could be brought by church authorities or concerned parishioners provide an instructive window into the politics of Reformation at the level of the parish. Did these parishioners have genuine grievances over the quality of religious service provided by their priest or were these actions taken to damage the career of unpopular clergymen. Some were evidently unpopular because they didn't share the confessional faith of their parishioners, some because they had been sent from London, Cambridge and Oxford to replace local clergy and some appear, quite simply, to have been reprobate priests.
